= Jean Talon (disambiguation) =

Jean Talon (1626–1694) was the first Intendant of New France.

Jean Talon or Jean-Talon may also refer to:

== Places ==
- Jean-Talon, an electoral district in Quebec, Canada
- Jean Talon Building, a government office building in Ottawa, Canada
- Jean-Talon Market in Montreal

== Transit ==
- Jean-Talon Street on the Island of Montreal
- Jean-Talon station (Montreal Metro), in Montreal
- Jean-Talon station, now Parc station, a multimodal station in Montreal
