= Nigeria research reactor-1 =

Research reactor in Nigeria

NIRR-1
- Zaria, Nigeria
- Operating institution: Centre for Energy Research and Training (CERT), Ahmadu Bello University
- Coordinates: 11.1512°N 7.6546°E
- Type: Miniature Neutron Source Reactor
- Power: 30 kW

Construction and upkeep
- Construction began: 1999-04-12
- First criticality: 2004-02-03

Technical specifications
- Neutron moderator: Light water
- Neutron reflector: Beryllium
- Control rods: Cadmium

The Nigeria research reactor (NIRR-1) is a nuclear research reactor located in Zaria, Nigeria. The reactor is located at the Centre for Energy Research and Training (CERT), part of Ahmadu Bello University. The reactor had its first criticality in 2004, launched by the then director of CERT, Prof. Ibrahim Musa Umar and is the only nuclear reactor currently operating in Nigeria.

In 2018, NIRR-1 completed a conversion from high-enriched uranium fuel to low-enriched fuel.

== Description ==
NIRR-1 is a Miniature neutron source reactor (MNSR), a type of light-water reactor designed by China's China Institute of Atomic Energy. MNSRs can produce a steady thermal power of 30 kilowatts. Construction on the reactor started in 1999, and had its first criticality in February 2004. The reactor is primarily used for nuclear activation analysis, geochronology, and training.

In September 2022, CERT signed an agreement to participate in the International Atomic Energy Agency's (IAEA) Internet Research Laboratory (IRL) project, which allows university students in countries without access to a research reactor to engage in reactor physics experiments

== Conversion to low enriched uranium ==
Like other MNSR's, NIRR-1 was originally commissioned with high-enriched uranium (HEU) fuel, which can present risks for nuclear proliferation. In the past few decades, there has been a concerted global effort to convert research reactors to low-enriched uranium (LEU) fuel, and over 40 reactors have been converted so far. Modern fuel and core designs allow reactors to be converted without sacrificing the performance of the systems as research and training tools, and support from the IAEA and other organizations can make the conversions economically feasible.

After scientists from Ahmadu Bello University and the China Institute of Atomic Energy concluded the conversion to LEU was feasible, the Nigeria Atomic Energy Commission lead the project to undertake conversion. The new core was fabricated, shipped, and converted in late 2018, returning to full power operations by December 2018. The HEU core was repatriated to China.

NIRR-1 was the second country outside China to convert their MNSR to low-enriched fuel, following Ghana's Ghana Research Reactor-1 conversion in 2016 and 2017. After Nigeria's successful conversion, there are no longer any research reactors in Africa that use HEU fuel.

== See also ==
- Research reactor
- Miniature neutron source reactor
