= Miniature neutron source reactor =

The Chinese built Miniature Neutron Source reactor (MNSR) is a small and compact research reactor modeled on the Canadian HEU SLOWPOKE-2 design.

The MNSR is tank-in-pool type, with highly enriched fuel (~ 90% U235 ). The tank is immersed in a large pool, and the core is, in turn, immersed in the tank. The maximum nominal power is ~ 30 kW, the power being removed by natural convection. The central core is formed of about 347 fuel rods, with 4 tie rods and 3 dummy elements distributed on a total of ten circles, each consisting of a number of fuel rods ranging between 6 and 62. A thick beryllium reflector (~ 10 cm) surrounds the core radially.

China operates three MNSRs and has supplied Ghana, Iran, Pakistan, Nigeria and Syria with reactors of this type as well as the highly enriched uranium (HEU) to fuel them. Since 1978, various national and international activities have been underway to convert research and test reactors from the use of HEU to LEU fuel.

== List of all MNSR reactors built around the world ==
Research centers that operate or have previously operated an MNSR:

Reactor Name	Country	City	Institution	Status	Enrichment	Operation Date	Closure Date	Notes
MNSR IAE	China	Beijing	China Institute of Atomic Energy	Operational	12.5%, LEU	1984		Converted to LEU in 2016.
In-Hospital Neutron Irradiator-Mark 1 (IHNI-1)	China	Beijing	Beijing Capture Technology Co. Ltd (BCTC)	Operational	12.5%, LEU	2009		
MNSR-SD	China	Jinan	Shandong University of Science and Technology	Permanent Shutdown	90%, HEU	1988	2010	
MNSR-SH	China	Shanghai	Shanghai Institute of Measurement And Testing Technology	Permanent Shutdown	90%, HEU	1991	2008	
MNSR-SZ	China	Shenzhen	Shenzhen University	Operational	90%, HEU	1988		
Ghana Research Reactor-1 (GHARR-1)	Ghana	Accra	Ghana Atomic Energy Commission	Operational	13%, LEU	1994		Converted to LEU in 2017.
ENTC MNSR	Iran	Isfahan	Isfahan Nuclear Technology/Research Center	Operational	90%, HEU	1994		
Nigeria research reactor-1 (NIRR-1)	Nigeria	Zaria	Centre for Energy Research and Training (CERT)	Operational	13%, LEU	2004		Converted to LEU in 2018.
PARR-II	Pakistan	Islamabad	Pakistan Institute of Nuclear Science & Technology	Operational	90.2%, HEU	1989		
SRR-1	Syria	Damascus	Atomic Energy Commission of Syria (AECS)	Permanenet shutdown	90%, HEU	1998	2011	

== See also ==
- Swimming pool reactor
- Nuclear reactor
- Nuclear power
- Nuclear fission
- Nuclear power plant
- Nuclear proliferation
