= Li Zhengwu =

Chinese

Li Zhengwu (Chinese: 李正武; 8 November 1916 – 30 July 2013) was a Chinese plasma and nuclear physicist, academician of the Chinese Academy of Sciences. He was a member of the Fourth, Fifth, Sixth, and Seventh National Committee of the Chinese People's Political Consultative Conference (CPPCC).

== Biography ==
Li was born on November 8, 1916, in Dongyang, Zhejiang Province. In 1931, he graduated from Zhejiang Provincial Senior High School. In 1938, he graduated from the Physics Department of Tsinghua University (as part of the National Southwestern Associated University), and taught at Jiangsu Medical College, and later became an associate professor of Shanghai Jiaotong University in 1945.

In 1947, Li Zhengwu went to study at the California Institute of Technology in the U.S., graduated in 1951, received his doctorate and stayed in the institute, served as a researcher at the Kellogg Laboratory of the California Institute of Technology, and was engaged in the work of nuclear technology and radiation applications in the City of Hope National Medical Center.

In 1955, Mr. and Mrs. Li returned to the People's Republic of China together with Mr. and Mrs. Qian Xuesen and other scientists. After returning to China, Li had long been engaged in the research of nuclear physics, plasma physics and controlled fusion at the Institute of China Institute of Atomic Energy, one of the scientists engaged in the research of controlled thermonuclear fusion.

In December 1969, Li began to participate in the research and design of the first tokamak of China, HL-1 (Project 451). In 1972, he proposed the initial experimental program for HL-1, and in September 1984, the general assembly and commissioning program was initiated ahead of schedule. In 1980, he was elected a member of the Chinese Academy of Sciences. In 1988, he presented the conceptual design framework for the HL-2.

== Death ==
On July 30, 2013, he died at the age of 97 due to a lung infection and sudden gastrointestinal bleeding at Beijing Anzhen Hospital.
