= Main Building (Statistics Canada) =

Coordinates: 45.405917°N 75.734221°W

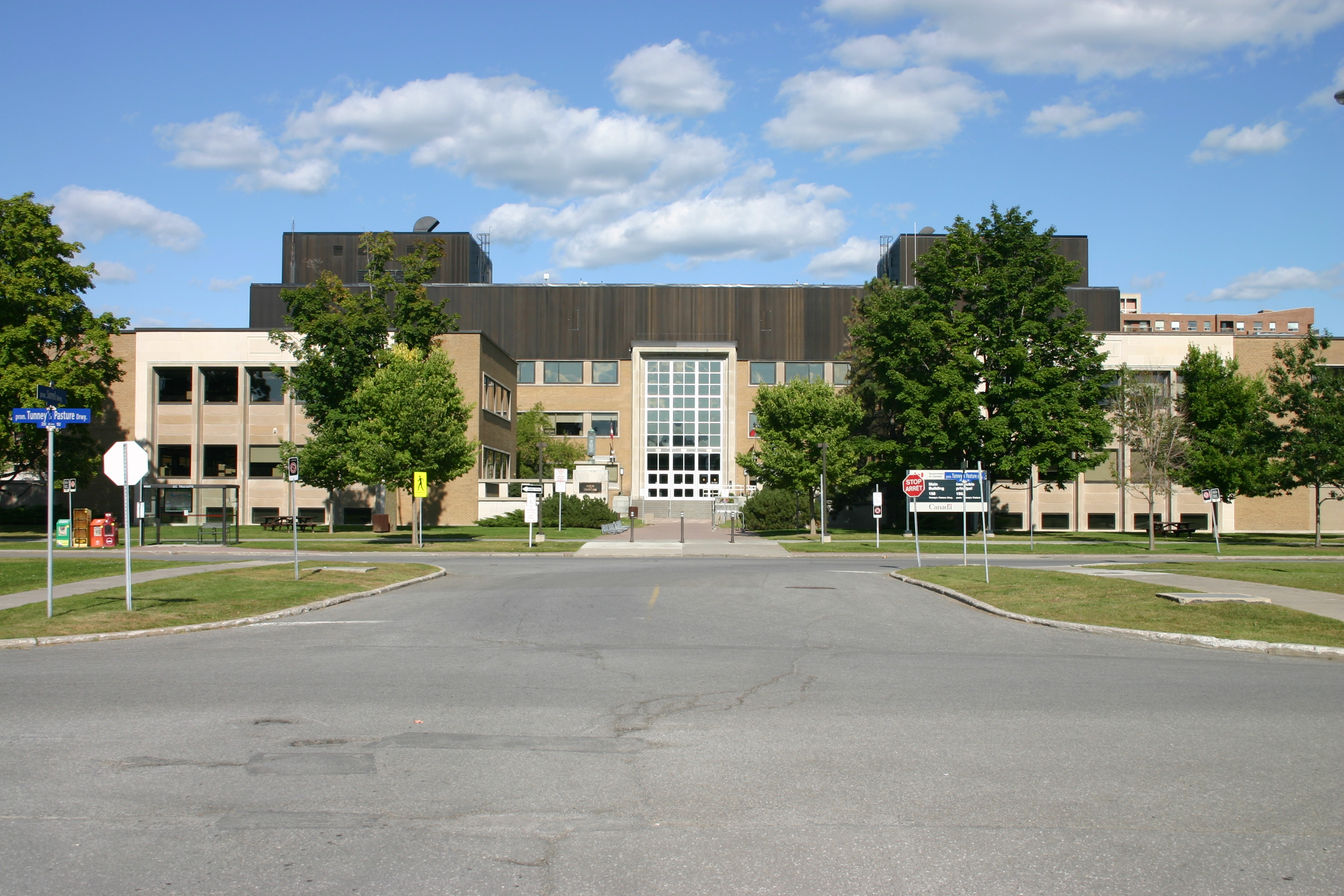
- Main Statistics Canada Building
- Interactive map of the Main Building area

General information
- Location: 150 Tunney's Pasture Driveway
- Opened: 1952

The Main Building, or Main Statistics Canada Building, is a four-storey federal government office building located in the Tunney's Pasture area of Ottawa, Ontario, Canada. It is connected on the north side by the Jean Talon Building and on the south side by the R. H. Coats Building. Most of its 1,700 occupants work for Statistics Canada. Other tenants include Health Canada, Public Works and Government Services Canada, and SNC-Lavalin.

The building was completed in 1952 to accommodate the growing staff of the Dominion Bureau of Statistics. At that time the Main Building was only one of two buildings in Tunney’s Pasture - the other being a heating plant. It has been listed as a Recognized Federal Heritage Building since 2005.

In recent years, the building has experienced structural and environmental problems such as water leakage and power failures.
