= Jean Talon =

Colonial administrator of New France (1626–1694)

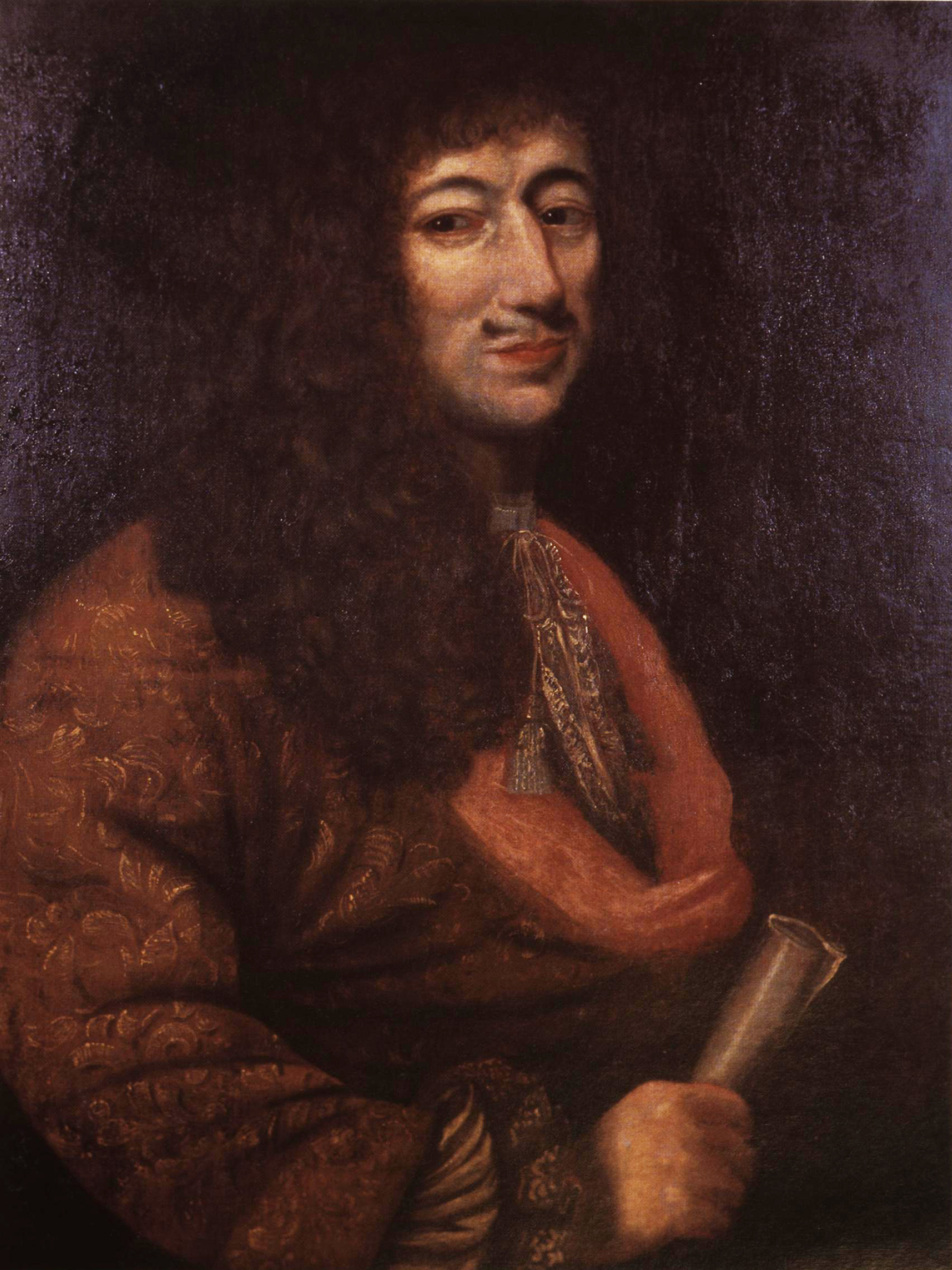
- Portrait by Claude François, 1671
- Born: January 8, 1626; Châlons-en-Champagne
- Died: November 23, 1694 (aged 68); France
- Resting place: Châlons-en-Champagne
- Other name: Count d'Orsainville
- Citizenship: France
- Occupation: Intendant of New France
- Years active: 1665–1672
- Employer: King Louis XIV
- Parent(s): Philippe Talon; Anne de Bury

Jean Talon, Count d'Orsainville (French pronunciation: [ʒɑ̃ talɔ̃]; January 8, 1626 – November 23, 1694) was a French colonial administrator who served as the first Intendant of New France. Talon was appointed by King Louis XIV and his minister, Jean-Baptiste Colbert, to serve as the Intendant of Justice, Public Order and Finances in Canada, Acadia and Newfoundland for two terms: 1665 to 1668 and 1670 to 1672.

Talon attempted to change the economic base of the colony from fur trading to agriculture, but found this could not be accomplished without a larger population. Talon arranged for settlers to come to New France, including over 800 women known as the King's Daughters. These were young orphans that came to New France to marry men present there. He encouraged population growth through marriage grants and baby bonuses, which were financial compensation given to a couple when they married, and again when they had children.

Talon tried to diversify the economy of New France by introducing new crops such as flax and hops for making beer, by starting a shipyard and lumber industry, and by encouraging mining. He started the first commercial brewery in Canada, La Brasserie du Roy, (Note: "The King's Brewery"; roy is an archaic spelling of modern French roi, "king".) in Québec City in 1668. Talon also worked to increase the population, the agricultural production, and the private sector of the burgeoning colony.

== Weak and destitute New France ==
Prior to Jean Talon's arrival in the French colony in 1665, the colony, founded by Samuel de Champlain and situated along St. Lawrence River, was in a state of weakness and destitution despite its existence for more than half a century. Its failure in progress had been due to several key factors, including poor governance of the colony by trading companies, forgetfulness on the part of France, and the horrors caused by the wars between the Haudenosaunee and the Wendat clans.

The progress of the colony had been stifled by trading companies, because the companies valued money and profit rather than the survival of the colony.

The French minister in charge of New France's affairs back in France was Cardinal Richelieu. At first he was involved in improving the colony's situation through attempts to increase the population of the colony, but he had been unsuccessful. Later on, his attention shifted to European politics, and New France's affairs were left ignored.

For 25 years, the colonists had been living with the effects of engaging in a violent war against the native inhabitants of the land, the Haudenosaunee. In New France, no adequate military force existed to battle the Haudenosaunee. Other situations added to the degrading of the colony, included internal strife among the leaders in New France over questions of liquor traffic, lack of immigration from France, dying fur trade, and poor agriculture. The colonists of New France, the governor and the bishop petitioned to France for assistance.

== Early life ==
Jean Talon was born in Châlons-en-Champagne to Philippe Talon and Anne Marie de Bury, where he was baptized on January 8, 1626. His family was related to the Parisian Talons, who held in succession the high office of attorney-general of France. After studying at the Jesuits' College of Clermont, Talon was employed in a commissariat. His abilities soon became apparent, and when he was 30, he was promoted to the position of Intendant for New France. When an Intendant was needed for the task of bringing the dying New France back to life, Colbert, an administrator of France, thought immediately of Talon and recommended him to the king. Talon's commission is dated March 23, 1665.

== Rescue of New France ==
Louis and his minister decided in 1663 to give New France a new constitution. The charter of the Company of One Hundred Associates was cancelled and the old Council of Quebec, which was formed in 1647, reorganized and became the Sovereign Council. The Sovereign Council was composed of the governor, the bishop, the intendant, an attorney-general, a secretary, and five councilors. Its functions included general jurisdiction for the administration of justice in civil and criminal matters, and the questions of police, roads, finance, and trade.

In 1665, the King sent the Carignan-Salières Regiment, a new governor, a new intendant, settlers and labourers, and supplies to New France. The Lieutenant Général of the Americas, Alexandre de Prouville de Tracy, was dispatched to deal with the threat of the Haudenosaunee. On September 12, 1665, the ship Saint Sebastien arrived in New France with Daniel de Rémy de Courcelle, the governor, and Jean Talon, the intendant of justice, police and finance.

A long letter of instructions was drafted by Colbert to guide Jean Talon in his mission to New France. The instructions dealt with mutual relations of Church and State, discussed the question of assistance to the recently created West India Company, and contemplated the war against the Haudenosaunee and how it could be carried out successfully. Other instructions included the following: the establishment of the Sovereign Council and the administration of justice; the settlement of the colony and the advisability of concentrating the population; the importance of fostering trade and industry; the question of tithes for the maintenance of the Church; the establishment of shipbuilding yards; and the encouragement of agriculture.

== Promoting colonization, agriculture, shipbuilding and commerce ==
It was up to Tracy and Courcelle to protect the colony from Haudenosaunee attacks. Once Talon arrived in New France, his first task was to organize transportation of provisions, ammunition, tool, and supplies for the maintenance of the troops and to take care of incoming soldiers and laborers, making sure that those who contracted disease, received proper nursing and medical attention.

Tracy had led a successful attack against the Haudenosaunee and won peace for the colony, restoring order and harmony. He left Canada on August 28, 1667; Courcelle remained as governor and Talon remained as the Intendant.

Now that peace was restored, Talon could carry out his works of colonization. In 1665, he had taken back the land granted to the Jesuits to establish about forty dwellings in preparation for new settlers, who would arrive the following year. These dwellings were to be grouped in three adjacent villages named Bourg-Royal, Bourg-la-Reine, and Bourg-Talon.

One of the most important historical documents of this period was carried out by Talon. A general census of New France was taken during the winter of 1666–67 to gather information about the colony. This the first Canadian census of which we have any record. It did not include the king's troops, which formed a body of 1200 men.

Talon was highly organized in his establishment of settlements. New villages were established as close as possible to the capital and the settlers were grouped around a central point to encourage mutual help and defense. Proper dwellings were made ready to receive the newcomers. Talon proceeded to fill these dwellings with settlers, trying to have some skilled artisans, such as carpenters, shoemakers, and masons in each village.

Talon's colonization policy was to give grants of settlements to soldiers and habitants. They took possession of the land and received an ample supply of food and tools required. They would receive payment in clearing and tilling the first two acres. In return, they had to clear and prepare another two acres in three or four years so that the two acres could be given to the next round of incoming settlers.

Under Talon's successful colonization policy, the settlement of the country progressed rapidly. A census taken in 1668 gave very satisfactory figures. While in 1667 there had been 11,448 acres (4,633 hectares) under cultivation, in 1668 15,649 acres (6,333 hectares) were now under cultivation, and wheat production amounted to 130,978 bushels.

Talon's activity showed great zeal for the public good. In terms of promoting agriculture, he erected a brewery near the St. Charles River in 1668 to support cultivation of wheat. Furthermore, hemp was highly needed in the colony for making coarse cloth. To promote the production of hemp, he created a monopoly of thread. He seized all the thread on the shops, and gave notice that to acquire thread, they had to exchange it with hemp.

Talon promoted commerce through his introduction of the shipbuilding industry. Through encouragement of shipbuilding, he had in mind the extension of the colony's trade with the West Indies and France. He also encouraged the development of the fishing industry along St.Lawrence River.

To further encourage the growth of the colony, Talon established various policies to promote marriage and bearing of children. To young women who married, the intendant gave 50 livres in household supplies and some provisions. According to the king's decree, each youth who married at or before the age of twenty was entitled to 20 livres, called "the king’s gift." During the years 1665–68, 6000 livres were used to support the marriage of young gentlewomen without means, and another 6000 livres for settlement and marriage of four captains, three lieutenants, five ensigns and a few minor officers. Furthermore, families having ten children in their household were entitled to a pension of three hundred livres annually and four hundred livres were given to family with twelve children.

To balance the number of men and women living in the colony and to promote further marriage, girls were carefully selected from France to be taken to Canada. Some of them were orphans, who grew up under the king's protection in charitable institutions. They were known as the "King's Daughters". The rest of the girls belonged to honest families, whose parents were willing to send them to a new country where they would be well provided for. When these young women arrived in Canada, they immediately married or were placed for a time in good families.

Strenuous efforts of Talon gave great impulse to population. In 1665, there were 3,215 settlers, and 533 families. Three years later, the population now contained 6,282 settlers and 1,139 families. Jean Talon was hard at work in laying the foundation of an economic and political system and making commercial, industrial progresses.

== Providing administration and internal order ==
Talon designed the main government buildings, especially the palace, paying special attention to the administration of justice. Under his commission, Talon had the right to "judge alone and with full jurisdiction in civil matters," to "hear all cases of crimes and misdemeanours, abuse and malversation, by whomsoever committed" to "proceed against all persons guilty of any crime, whatever might be their quality or condition, to pursue the proceedings until final completion, judgment and execution thereof."

Talon wished to make justice speedy, accessible to all and inexpensive. He proposed a three level system. In each parish, judges would be established to hear all civil cases involving not more than ten livres. Appeals for decisions given by the local judges could be taken to four judges based in Quebec. Final appeal was made to the Sovereign Council, which acted as a court. In 1669 Talon wrote a memorandum in which we find these words: "Justice is administered in the first instance by judges in the seigneuries; then by a lieutenant civil and criminal appointed by the company in each of the jurisdictions of Quebec and Three Rivers; and above all by the Sovereign Council, which is the last instance decides all cases where an appeal lies" Talon attempted to establish a method of settlement out of court. He also introduced an equitable system of land registration.

At that time, the Sovereign Council functioned as the legislature, the executive, the courts of justice and various commissions. One of the most important laws established by the Sovereign Council under Talon's guidance was that concerning the importation of liquor and the establishment of the brewing industry. The decree stated that immoral self-indulgence was caused by importation of great quantity of liquor from France. Talon thought that establishment of breweries in the colony would solve the problem of immoderate use of alcohol. The breweries would also support colony's agriculture in wheat.

In 1667, the Sovereign Council inspired by Talon discussed the formation of a company of Canadians to secure the exclusive privilege of trading. The charter granted the commercial monopoly to the West India Company. In 1668, the council sent a letter asking for freedom of trade to Colbert. The colonists had suffered from high prices and lack of availability in necessary goods. This was detrimental to the colony.

The sale of liquor to the Native Americans had always been prohibited in the colony. In 1657, the prohibition had been renewed and ratified under a decree of the King's State Council. In 1663, the Sovereign Council established a law prohibiting indirect or direct selling or giving of brandy to Native Americans. Jean Talon supported the Sovereign Council's decisions in the beginning. However, he was becoming more and more impressed by the material benefits and less convinced of its moral danger. He came to consider prohibition of the liquor traffic as a mistake, damaging to the trade and progress of the colony and to French influence over the Native Americans tribes. His earnest desire for the prosperity of the colony misled him to make the wrong judgment and brandy trafficking was accepted and approved.

The climate was severe and Talon's health was deteriorating. Talon asked twice for his recall back to France. He had family matters to take care of and he wanted relief from his difficulties with the governor and the spiritual authorities. Louis XIV gave him leave to return to France and Claude de Bouteroue was appointed to take over his duties. Talon left Quebec in November 1668.

== Return to New France ==
Back in France, Jean Talon continued to support the Canadian colony. The king and Colbert readily approved his plans for strengthening the Canadian colony. Troops, laborers, women, settlers, and supplies were sent in response to Talon's requests. Talon's stay in France was only brief. On May 10, 1669, the king signed Talon's new commission to return to Canada. On August 18, after an absence from New France for a year and nine months, he landed once more at Quebec.

During his second term as the intendant of new France, he focused on external affairs of the colony. He wanted to extend French influence to the north, south and west. On October 10, 1670, he wrote to the king: "Since my arrival, I have sent resolute men to explore farther than has ever been done in Canada, some to the west, and north-west, others to the south-west and south."

His policy of exploration and discovery was directed towards increasing France's reputation, developing trade; and therefore, preparing the way for the future greatness of Canada.

Furthermore, through promotion of the development of Acadia, he tried to strengthen Canada on the border with New England and the alliance with the northern tribes opened up trade opportunities with the wide area extending from Lake St. John to Lake Mistassini and to Hudson Bay.

Under the authority of a decree of the King's Council of State, Talon gave a large number of seigneuries as grants. From October 10 to November 8 he granted about sixty seigneuries to officers and others settlements. On November 3 alone, he made 31 grants. It is true, seigneurial grants had been made in Canada before, but it was made without any preconceived plan or well-defined object. Talon organized the system of seigneuries with a well-defined object, which was to protect and to colonize the country.

== Legacy ==
Jean Talon had saved the colony from destitution through the implementation of policies that cultivated agriculture, colonization, trade, industry and naval construction. He strengthened the foundation on which justice and government was placed. With strong outlook into the future, he prepared the way for the future extension and growth of New France.

Jean Talon left Canada in November 1672. The king had made a barony of his estate in recognition of his services and created him Baron des Islets. Later on he became Comte d’Orsainville and was appointed Captain of the Mariemont Castle.

After a time, he became Premier Valet de la garde-robe du Roi (First Valet of the King's wardrobe). Finally, he attained the coveted office of secretary of the king's cabinet. Jean Talon died on November 24, 1694, at the age of sixty-eight.

== Honours ==
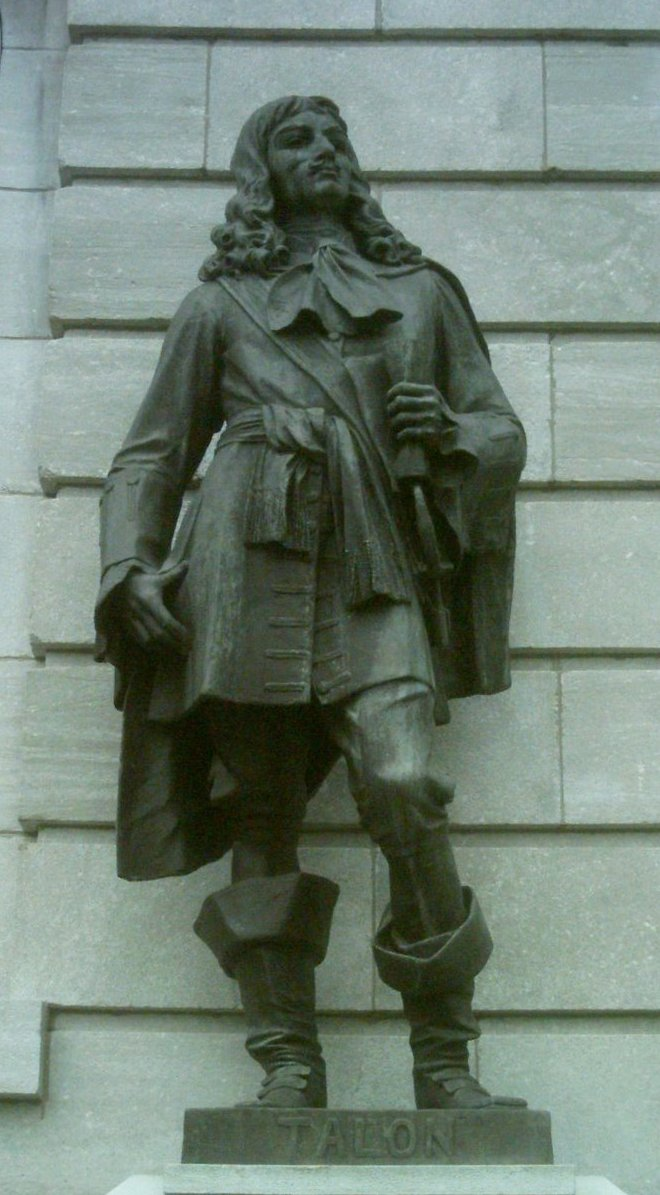
Jean Talon, statue in front of the Quebec Parliament Building

Several sites and landmarks were named to honour Jean Talon. They include:

- Rue Jean-Talon (Jean Talon Street), located in Shawinigan, Quebec, Canada
- The Jean Talon Building (Building 5) in Tunney's Pasture, Ottawa, Ontario (a Statistics Canada building, so named because Jean Talon conducted the first census in what is now Canada)
- The provincial electoral district of Jean-Talon, Quebec
- Rue Jean-Talon (Jean-Talon Street), an important street of 14.01 kilometers (8.71 mi) going east–west in the city of Montreal, Quebec
- Metro Jean-Talon (Jean Talon subway station), the intersection of the orange and the blue subway lines in Montreal, Quebec
- Marché Jean-Talon, a farmer's market in Montreal
- Rue Jean Talon in Châlons en Champagne
- Statue Jean-Talon in Châlons en Champagne

== See also ==
- Canadian Hereditary Peers
