= 2016 Canadian census =

Detailed enumeration of Canadians taken May 10, 2016

- May 10, 2016
- Statistics Canada's visual identifier for its 2016 Census of Population

General information
- Country: Canada

Results
- Total population: 35,151,728 (▲5.0%)
- Most populous province or territory: Ontario (13,448,494)
- Least populous province or territory: Yukon (35,874)

The 2016 Canadian census was an enumeration of Canadian residents, which counted a population of 35,151,728, a 5% increase from its 2011 population of 33,476,688. The census, conducted by Statistics Canada, was Canada's seventh quinquennial census. (Note: Canada's first quinquennial census was conducted in 1956.) The official census day was May 10, 2016. Census web access codes began arriving in the mail on May 2, 2016. The 2016 census marked the reinstatement of the mandatory long-form census, which had been dropped in favour of the voluntary National Household Survey for the 2011 census. With a response rate of 98.4%, Statistics Canada described it as the best census ever recorded since the 1666 census of New France. This census was succeeded by Canada's 2021 census.

== Planning ==
Consultation with census data users, clients, stakeholders and other interested parties closed in November 2012. Qualitative content testing, which involved soliciting feedback regarding the questionnaire and tests responses to its questions, was scheduled for the fall of 2013, with more extensive testing occurring in May 2014. Statistics Canada was scheduled to submit its census content recommendations for review by the Parliament of Canada in December 2014 for subsequent final approval by the Cabinet of Canada.

On November 5, 2015, during the first Liberal caucus meeting after forming a majority government, the party announced that it would reinstate the mandatory long-form census, starting in 2016. By early January 2016, Statistics Canada had announced a need for 35,000 people to complete this survey to commence in May.

== Data release schedule ==
The release dates for geography products from the 2016 census were:

- November 16, 2016, for boundary files (first edition), road network files, hydrography files, reference maps (first edition), attribute information products (correspondence files), and reference guides and documents (first edition); and
- February 8, 2017, for boundary files (second edition), reference maps (second edition), attribute information products (GeoSuite and geographic attribute file), and reference guides and documents (second edition).

The release dates for data by release topic from the 2016 census are:

- February 8, 2017, for population and dwelling counts;
- May 3, 2017, for age and sex, type of dwelling;
- May 10, 2017, for Census of Agriculture;
- August 2, 2017, for language and families, households and marital status;
- September 13, 2017, for income;
- October 25, 2017, for immigration and ethnocultural diversity, housing and Aboriginal peoples; and
- November 29, 2017, for education, labour, journey to work, language of work and mobility and migration.

== Enumeration ==
Portions of Canada's three territories and remote areas within Alberta, Labrador, Manitoba, Quebec and Saskatchewan were subject to early enumeration between February 1, 2016, and March 31, 2016. Enumeration of the balance of Canada began on May 2, 2016, with the unveiling of the online census questionnaire, eight days prior to the official census day of May 10, 2016. Because of a wildfire in early May in northeast Alberta, Statistics Canada suspended enumeration efforts in the Fort McMurray area with alternate means to collect data from its evacuated residents to be determined at a later date. Shortly after re-entry, residents were encouraged to complete their census form online or over the phone; however, door-to-door enumeration remained suspended.

== Public response ==
Non-binary activists expressed concern that the choice between "male" and "female" on the "sex" question left them with no valid options. In response, Statistics Canada stated that "Respondents who cannot select one category ... can leave the question blank and indicate, in the Comments section at the end of the questionnaire, the reason(s) for which they've chosen to leave this question unanswered." Statistics Canada stated that they intend to analyze these comments but that because of the technical difficulties of analyzing free-form text, this analysis will not be released on the same schedule as the binary gender data.

== Results ==
In the 2016 Census of Population, Canada recorded a population of 35,151,728 living in 14,072,079 of its 15,412,443 total private dwellings, a 5% change from its 2011 population of 33,476,688. With a land area of 8,965,588.85 km^{2} (3,461,633.21 sq mi), it had a population density of 3.9/km^{2} (10.2/sq mi) in 2016. Canada's most and least populous provinces were Ontario at 13,448,494 and Prince Edward Island at 142,907 respectively. Among the three territories, the Northwest Territories was the largest with a population of 41,786 while Yukon was the smallest with a population of 35,874 after Nunavut's population overtook Yukon for the first time in its history.

The majority of Canada's population in 2016 were females at 50.9%, while 49.1% were males. The average age of the population was 41.0 years (40.1 years for males and 41.9 years for females).

In terms of occupied private dwellings, 53.6% of them were single detached dwellings, followed by 18% being units in apartment buildings less than five storeys, and 9.9% being apartment units in buildings with five or more storeys. The average household size was 2.4 people per household. Two-person households were the most frequent size among private households at 34.4%.

In regards to the journey to work data in Ottawa, there was an increase of people driving their car to work of 51.3% which has the highest mode of transportation. On the other hand, public transit decreased to 25.1% comparing to the 2011 census. The census data in 2016 shows that people have been using other modes of transportation more than other years, this includes walking and cycling.

=== Population ===
| Rank | Province or territory | Population as of 2016 census | Population as of 2011 census | Change | Percent change |
|---|---|---|---|---|---|
| 1 | Ontario | 13,448,494 | 12,851,821 | 596,673 ▲ | 4.6 ▲ |
| 2 | Quebec | 8,164,361 | 7,903,001 | 261,360 ▲ | 3.3 ▲ |
| 3 | British Columbia | 4,648,055 | 4,400,057 | 247,998 ▲ | 5.6 ▲ |
| 4 | Alberta | 4,067,175 | 3,645,257 | 421,918 ▲ | 11.6 ▲ |
| 5 | Manitoba | 1,278,365 | 1,208,268 | 70,097 ▲ | 5.8 ▲ |
| 6 | Saskatchewan | 1,098,352 | 1,033,381 | 64,971 ▲ | 6.3 ▲ |
| 7 | Nova Scotia | 923,598 | 921,727 | 1,871 ▲ | 0.2 ▲ |
| 8 | New Brunswick | 747,101 | 751,171 | −4,070 ▼ | −0.5 ▼ |
| 9 | Newfoundland and Labrador | 519,716 | 514,536 | 5,180 ▲ | 1.0 ▲ |
| 10 | Prince Edward Island | 142,907 | 140,204 | 2,703 ▲ | 1.9 ▲ |
| 11 | Northwest Territories | 41,786 | 41,462 | 324 ▲ | 0.8 ▲ |
| 12 | Nunavut | 35,944 | 31,906 | 4,038 ▲ | 12.7 ▲ |
| 13 | Yukon | 35,874 | 33,897 | 1,977 ▲ | 5.8 ▲ |
| | Canada | 35,151,728 | 33,476,688 | 1,675,040 ▲ | 5.0 ▲ |

=== Ethnic origins ===
| 2016 census | | Population | % of total population |
|---|---|---|---|
| European origins | | 25,111,700 | 72.9% |
| Visible minority group | South Asian | 1,924,635 | 5.6% |
| Visible minority group | Chinese | 1,577,060 | 4.6% |
| Visible minority group | Black | 1,198,540 | 3.5% |
| Visible minority group | Filipino | 780,125 | 2.3% |
| Visible minority group | Arab | 523,235 | 1.5% |
| Visible minority group | Latin American | 447,325 | 1.3% |
| Visible minority group | Southeast Asian | 313,260 | 0.9% |
| Visible minority group | West Asian | 264,305 | 0.8% |
| Visible minority group | Korean | 188,710 | 0.5% |
| Visible minority group | Japanese | 92,920 | 0.3% |
| Visible minority group | Visible minority, n.i.e. | 132,090 | 0.4% |
| Visible minority group | Multiple visible minorities | 232,375 | 0.7% |
| Total visible minority population | | 7,674,580 | 22.3% |
| Not a visible minority | | 26,785,480 | 77.7% |
| Aboriginal group | First Nations | 977,235 | 2.8% |
| Aboriginal group | Métis | 587,545 | 1.7% |
| Aboriginal group | Inuit | 65,030 | 0.2% |
| Total Aboriginal population | | 1,673,785 | 4.9% |
| Total population | | 34,460,065 | 100% |

== See also ==
- Demographics of Canada
- Statistics Act
- Population and housing censuses by country
