= SLOWPOKE reactor =

Family of nuclear research reactors

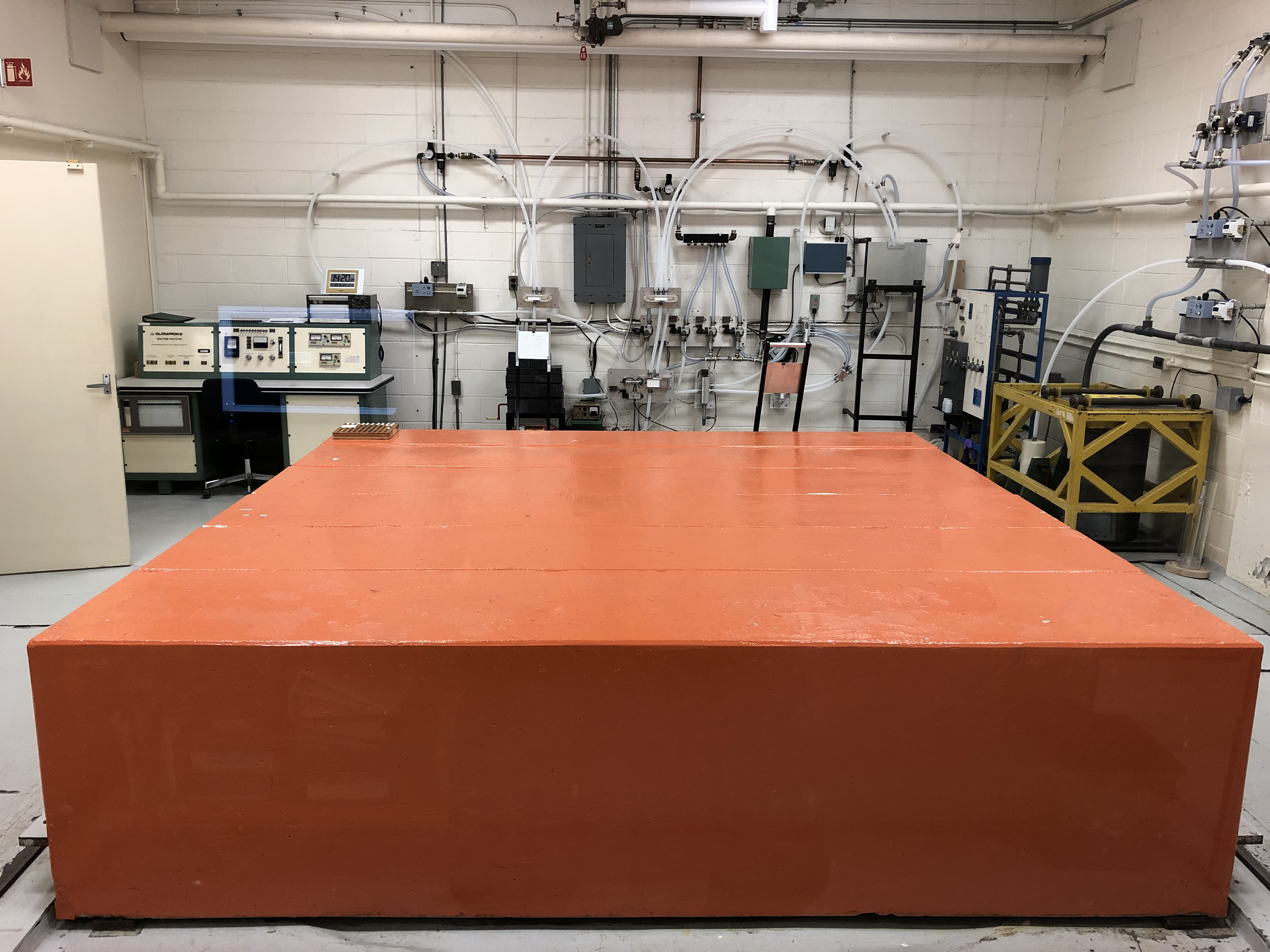
- Polytechnique Montreal's SLOWPOKE-2 reactor pit cover.
- Generation: Neutron
- Reactor concept: Low-energy, tank-in-pool type nuclear research reactor

Main parameters of the reactor core
- Fuel (fissile material): Enriched uranium
- Primary coolant: Light-water

Reactor usage
- Primary use: Neutron activation analysis

The SLOWPOKE (backronym for Safe LOW-POwer Kritical Experiment) is a family of low-energy, tank-in-pool type nuclear research reactors designed by Atomic Energy of Canada Limited (AECL) beginning in the late 1960s. John W. Hilborn (born 1926 or 1927) is the scientist most closely associated with their design. They are beryllium-reflected with a very low critical mass, but provide neutron fluxes higher than available from a small particle accelerator or other radioactive sources.

== Basic design ==
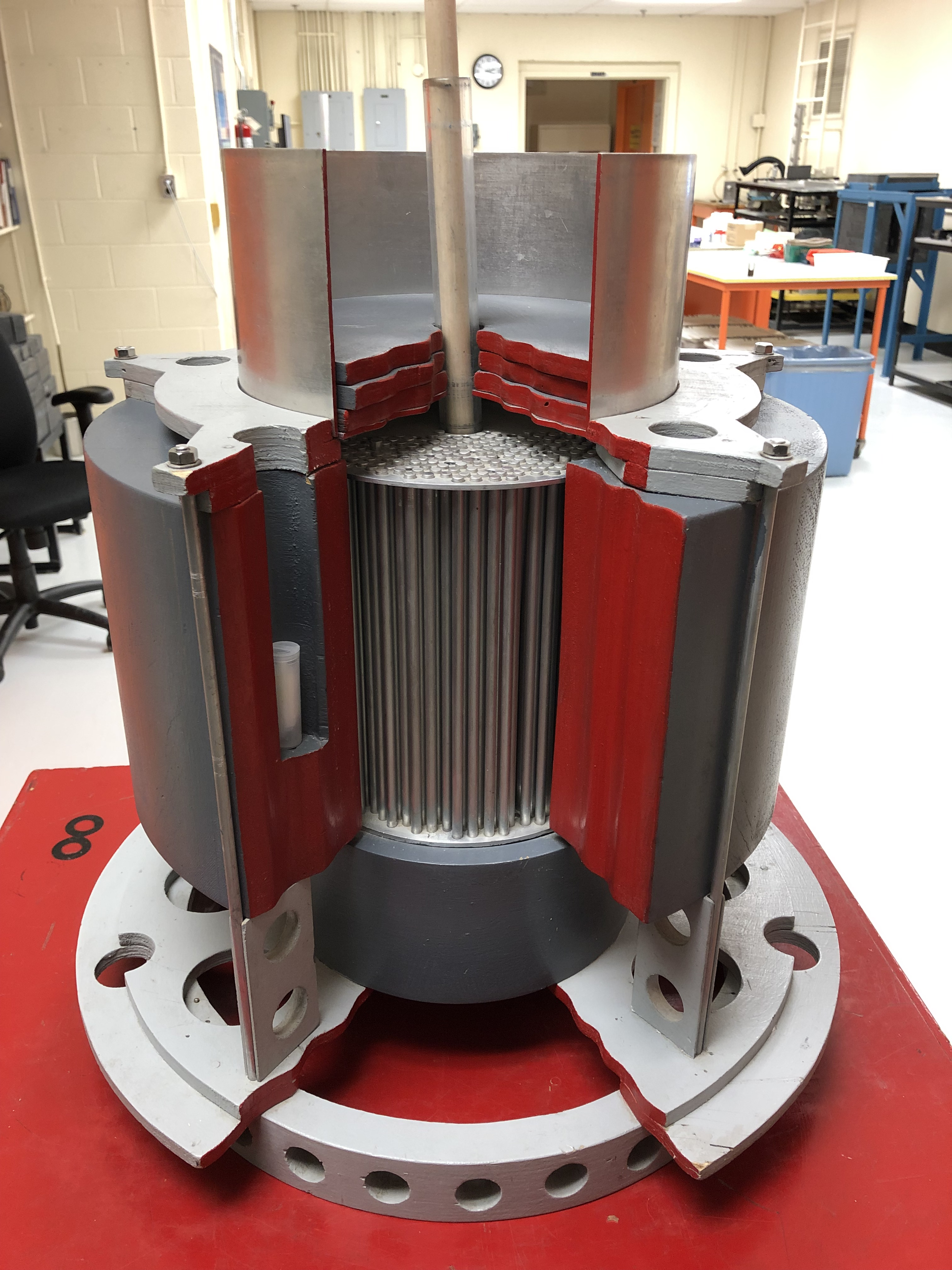
SLOWPOKE reactor core model.

The SLOWPOKE-2 reactors (most numerous of the SLOWPOKE family) originally used 93% highly enriched uranium in the form of 28% uranium-aluminium alloy with aluminium cladding, and then in 1985 a new low enriched uranium design (~19.9 % enriched) was commissioned using ceramic UO_{2} fuel. The core is an assembly of about 200-300 fuel pins, 22 centimetres (8.7 in) in diameter and 23 centimetres (9.1 in) high, surrounded by a fixed beryllium annulus and a bottom beryllium slab. Criticality is maintained as the fuel burns by adding beryllium plates in a tray on top of the core. The reactor core sits in a pool of regular light-water, 2.5 metres (8 ft 2 in) in diameter by 6 metres (20 ft) deep, which provides cooling via natural convection. In addition to passive cooling, the reactor has a high degree of inherent safety; that is, it can regulate itself through passive, natural means, such as the chain reaction slowing down if the water heats up or forms bubbles. These characteristics are so dominant, in fact, that the SLOWPOKE-2 reactor is licensed to operate unattended overnight (but monitored remotely). Most SLOWPOKES are rated at a nominal 20 kW, although operation at a higher power for shorter durations is possible.

== History ==
=== SLOWPOKE-1 and SLOWPOKE-2 ===
The SLOWPOKE research reactor was conceived in 1967 at the Whiteshell Laboratories of AECL. In 1970 a prototype unit called SLOWPOKE (both the name of the reactor and of the prototype reactor class of 2 reactors it was a member of; especially later when further generations of SLOWPOKE reactors had appeared, these types of reactors were named SLOWPOKE-1), was designed and built at Chalk River Laboratories. It was primarily intended for Canadian universities, providing a higher neutron flux than available from small commercial accelerators, while avoiding the complexity and high operating costs of existing nuclear reactors. The Chalk River prototype went critical in 1970, and was moved to the University of Toronto in 1971. It had one sample site in the beryllium reflector and operated at a power level of 5 kW. In 1973 the power was increased to 20 kW and the period of unattended operation was increased from 4 hours to 18 hours. The reactor was dismantled in 1976 and replaced by a next generation SLOWPOKE-2 reactor.

The first commercial example started construction in 1970 and was started up 14 May 1971 at AECL's Commercial Products Division in Tunney's Pasture - 20 Goldenrod Driveway, Ottawa, Ontario. It had a power output of 20 kW (thermal) and it was of the SLOWPOKE/SLOWPOKE-1 type. The reactor was a prototype and was shut down in 1984.

Two reactors of SLOWPOKE aka SLOWPOKE-1 type were built. Both reactors have been decommissioned.

In 1976 a next generation commercial design, named SLOWPOKE-2 (again both the name of the reactor and reactor class, further members of which were constructed elsewhere), was installed at the University of Toronto, replacing the original SLOWPOKE-1 unit (see above). The commercial model has five sample sites in the beryllium reflector and five sites stationed outside the reflector.

Between 1976 and 1985, a further seven SLOWPOKE-2 reactors with Highly Enriched Uranium (HEU) fuel were commissioned in six Canadian cities and in Kingston, Jamaica. In 1985 the first Low-Enriched Uranium (LEU) fuelled SLOWPOKE-2 reactor was commissioned at the Royal Military College of Canada (RMC) in Kingston, Ontario. Since then five SLOWPOKE-2 reactors have been decommissioned (Saskatchewan Research Council, University of Toronto, University of Alberta, Dalhousie University, and AECL/MDS Nordion reactor in Kanata), and three converted to LEU (Polytechnique Montreal, University of the West Indies and Royal Military College of Canada ).

All in all, eight SLOWPOKE-2 reactors were built, seven in Canada and one in Jamaica. As of 2022, of the eight, three are operational (the ones using/converted for LEU) and five have been decommissioned.

=== SLOWPOKE-3 and SLOWPOKE-4 ===
AECL also designed and built (start of construction 1985, start of operation 1987) a scaled-up version (2-10 MWth) called the SLOWPOKE Demonstration Reactor (SDR, SLOWPOKE-3) for district heating at its Whiteshell Nuclear Research Establishment in Manitoba. The economics of a district-heating system based on SDR technology were estimated to be competitive with that of conventional fossil fuels. However, the market for this technology did not materialize, and the proposed SES-10 (SLOWPOKE-4 based on SDR experience) was never built, and the SDR shutdown for decommissioning in 1989.

=== Marine power source ===
During the mid-1980s Canada briefly considered converting its Oberon-class submarines to nuclear power using a SLOWPOKE nuclear reactor to continuously recharge the ship's batteries during submerged operations. A good deal of work had been done on potential marine applications of the reactor at Royal Military College of Canada.

== Current applications ==
SLOWPOKE reactors are used mainly for neutron activation analysis (NAA), in research and as a commercial service, but also for teaching, training, irradiation studies, neutron radiography (only at the Royal Military College of Canada), and the production of radioactive tracers. The main advantages are the reliability and ease of use of this design of reactor and the reproducibility of the neutron flux. Since the fuel is not modified at all for at least 20 years, the neutron spectrum in the irradiation sites does not change and the neutron flux is reproducible to about 1%.

Three of the original reactors are still in operation. Although all of the technical goals of this reactor were achieved, the lack of foreign sales was disappointing.

- Royal Military College of Canada's non-power reactor operating licence was renewed and will be valid from July 1, 2023, until June 30, 2043. RMC has operated a small SLOWPOKE-2 reactor (nominal reactor power of 20 kW thermal) since 1985 (start of construction and operation 1985). A Neutron Beam Tube (NBT) was added in February 1999 to the SLOWPOKE-2 facility for radioscopy and tomography operations (2-dimensional and 3-dimensional non-destructive imaging techniques).
- École Polytechnique de Montréal's SLOWPOKE-2 non-power reactor (20 kW thermal) operating licence was renewed and will be valid from July 1, 2023, until June 30, 2033. The reactor has been in operation for 40 years (construction started 1975, operation started 1976) and is used for research, teaching, neutron generation and isotope production.
- The University of the West Indies International Centre for Environmental and Nuclear Sciences in Kingston Jamaica continues to operate their SLOWPOKE-2 reactor, which has since been converted to LEU in 2015 through a partnership with the National Nuclear Security Administration (NNSA) and with the assistance of the IAEA.

== Former applications ==
Two of the SLOWPOKE/SLOWPOKE-1 reactors (out of 2 built), five of the SLOWPOKE-2 reactors (out of 8 built) and the single SLOWPOKE-3 reactor (out of 1 built) have been decommissioned. No SLOWPOKE-4 reactor was ever built.

- Dalhousie University applied for, and was issued, a Licence to de-fuel, and decommission the SLOWPOKE-2 Reactor Facility, which was part of Dalhousie's Trace Analysis Research Centre in Halifax, Nova Scotia on August 31, 2011. Dalhousie's SLOWPOKE-2 reactor (20 kW thermal) was built and started operation in 1976; it was dismantled 2011.
- The University of Toronto’s SLOWPOKE/SLOWPOKE-1 reactor (first 5 then 20 kW thermal) operated first in Chalk River Laboratories in 1970 and in the University of Toronto 1971-1976. The SLOWPOKE/SLOWPOKE-1 reactor was dismantled in 1976. University of Toronto’s SLOWPOKE-2 reactor (20 kW thermal) operated from 1976 until December 31, 1998. The University of Toronto applied for, and was issued, a Licence to Decommission its SLOWPOKE-2 Nuclear Research Reactor Facility in 2001.
- The AECL's Commercial Products Division (Tunney's Pasture - 20 Goldenrod Driveway, Ottawa, Ontario) SLOWPOKE/SLOWPOKE-1 reactor (20 kW thermal) operated 1971-1984. The building that housed it has since been demolished.
- University of Alberta’s SLOWPOKE-2 reactor (20 kW thermal) operated from April 22, 1977 until being dismantled on August 5, 2017. The University of Alberta applied for, and was issued a Licence to Decommission its SLOWPOKE-2 Nuclear Research Reactor Facility in 2017. The U of A SLOWPOKE console is now part of the collection of the Society for the Preservation of Canada's Nuclear Heritage, Inc, in Deep River, Ontario, along with other SLOWPOKE artifacts.
- Saskatchewan Research Council's SLOWPOKE-2 reactor (16 kW thermal) operated from 1981, until being shut down in December 2017. Decommissioning was expected to be completed sometime in 2020.
- The SLOWPOKE-2 reactor (20 kW thermal) located in Kanata, originally owned and operated by AECL and later by MDS Nordion, started construction and operation in 1984. It was shut down 1989.
- The SLOWPOKE Demonstration Reactor (SDR or SLOWPOKE-3; 2-10 MWth) at AECL's Whiteshell Nuclear Research Establishment operated 1987–1989 (start of construction 1985).
- Under IAEA's oversight, a single SLOWPOKE reactor was (10kW) was operated in PINSTECH in Nilore in 1974. This was re-designed and converted in to Chinese-design in 19869
- The proposed SES-10 (SLOWPOKE-4) reactor was never built.

== See also ==
- Nuclear reactor
- Nuclear fission
