= Underground Research Laboratory =

The Underground Research Laboratory was a test site for deep geological repository of nuclear waste operated by Atomic Energy of Canada Limited's (AECL's) Whiteshell Laboratories near Lac du Bonnet in Manitoba, Canada. The site was built inside a large granite batholith, typical of the Canadian Shield. The site was selected in 1980, construction began in 1982 and it opened in 1985. No radioactive material was stored at the site, it was used purely for measurements of water exchange, rock movement, and other issues that would affect the safety of such materials. The site was also used by a variety of international users. As part of the wider wind-down of AECL activities, the decision was made to close the URL in 2003. Cleanup work began in 2006 and completed in 2010. The site continues to host a single international experiment measuring water leakage through a massive clay plug.

== History ==
=== Nuclear Fuel Waste Management Program ===
Through the 1970s the issue of storing nuclear waste became a serious concern within the nuclear industry. The rocks of the Canadian Shield, many of which have been physically unchanged for billions of years, seemed like a natural candidate for such storage. The fact that high-grade nuclear fuel was held in such formations for billions of years in nature was especially attractive; such deposits, like at Cigar Lake in northern Saskatchewan, were powerful evidence that this mode of storage was secure for geological time frames.

In 1978, the governments of Canada and Ontario agreed to fund the "Nuclear Fuel Waste Management Program" (NFWMP) to consider the deep geological repository as a solution to the growing inventory of spent fuel. At the time, it was estimated the fleet of CANDU reactors would produce 3.6 million fuel bundles by the end of life of existing reactors. Organized by the Atomic Energy Control Board (AECB), AECL was tasked with developing the required technology, while Ontario Hydro would pay for the actual storage and be responsible for transport of the waste to and from a production site. An updated agreement was signed in 1981, with the explicit instructions that no nuclear material would ever be placed in the experimental site.

AECL's original plans for long-term waste disposal was a three-stage process; in the first stage the fuel would be stored in the existing spent fuel pools located at the reactor sites for a period of six to ten years. After that time the overall decay rates have decreased to the point where it can be safely moved. For the second stage, the fuel would be placed in an underground facility for a period of about 300 years. By that time the most active gamma ray emitters have burned off and the fuel becomes much safer to handle. The final stage would see the fuel moved to surface sites, but over time this was abandoned and the entire time was to be spent underground.

Building the underground portion in the Canadian Shield eliminated concerns about geological events exposing the waste en masse; it is easy to find large batholiths that have been intact for billions of years. However, these also include fractures of various sizes and the nature of water movement through these sorts of rock formation was a topic of limited research. In 1978, the NFWMP decided to build a test site to answer two primary questions, one was to characterize the water flow and chemistry in ancient rocks of this type, and the other was to test a proposed sealing system that consisted of a layer of clay sandwiched between engineered concrete walls.

=== Site selection and construction ===
Whiteshell, built on top of the 1400 km^{2} 2.6 BYa Lac du Bonnet batholith, was asked to find a suitable site. The criterion was that there was at least one square kilometre of partially exposed rock on the surface, that it had not previously been used for excavation, that there was power available, and that it was within reasonable distance of Whiteshell. A total of eight sites were considered before one about 50 kilometres (31 mi) northeast of Whiteshell was selected, part of the same batholith.

Between 1980 and 1983 a series of seven deep boreholes and many smaller ones were made around the site to characterize it. The shaft surface site was built during 1982 and 1983, and the first major digging began on 12 May 1984. The first level, 240 Level, was completed in 1987, along with the secondary ventilation shaft. The main shaft was extended to 443 m deep by 1988, and the excavation of the 420 Level was completed in 1991. In total, 34,270 cubic metres were excavated for a total cost of about $40 million.

=== Operations ===
The first set of nine major experiments was designed in 1989 and began operations in 1990. Some of these involved measurements of the flow of water in the various rock formations, while others were concerned with the engineered seals and container technologies. Many new experiments joined the original series, including ones on blast effects from nearby mining operations, as well as evacuations. New groups from the US, Japan and France were collaborating on new experiments like the Tunnel Sealing Experiment and the Quarried Block Radionuclide Migration Experiment. The University of Toronto also ran the "mine-by" experiment on the effects of excavating within an existing mine site.

The AECL decided to close the Whiteshell facility in 1994 and had started the process of winding down operations. In 1996, the AECL held public hearings to present the results from many of the original URL experiments. Although they found some concerns in the research, the AECB decided enough was known to move ahead to begin selecting a production repository site. In 1997, Ontario Hydro took over the experiments related to long-term storage, including many of the experiments at the URL, reorganized as the Deep Geologic Repository Technology Program (DGRTP). Yearly costs for the URL were on the order of $3 million with incomes on the order of $9 to $10 million, although about 70% of that was from Ontario Hydro. Ontario Hydro, which became Ontario Power Generation in 1999, announced its intention to stop funding research at the site, in favour of moving forward with production.

=== Closure ===
In 2003, AECL announced it would be shutting down the URL, unless a buyer or tenant could be found. This did not happen, and the site was officially closed in June 2003. Closure work began in 2006, removing equipment from the now unused levels. By the time this process was complete in 2010, all that remained was the tracks used by the underground railway system. A large plug made of clay sandwiched between two plates of high-performance concrete was placed in the main shaft in an ongoing experiment to measure the performance of the plug as a way of blocking the flow of water between aquifers.

== Description ==
The site consisted of a main shaft 433 metres (1,421 ft) deep with two main working levels at 240 metres (790 ft) and 420 metres (1,380 ft). Smaller levels were constructed at 130 metres (430 ft) and 300 metres (980 ft) as drilling support sites. A ventilation shaft carrying propane-heated air paralleled the main shaft.

The levels were built because the rock formation includes two aquifers, a freshwater one at higher levels and a saltwater one deeper. A key concern for the URL was developing technologies to prevent mixing of the two aquifers.

The ultimate result of the URL was a ten-volume Environmental Impact Statement about the entire deep geologic repository concept.
