= Petkau effect =

The Petkau effect is an early counterexample to linear-effect assumptions usually made about radiation exposure. It was found by Dr. Abram Petkau at the Atomic Energy of Canada Whiteshell Nuclear Research Establishment, Manitoba and published in Health Physics March 1972. The Petkau effect was coined by Swiss nuclear hazards commentator Ralph Graeub in 1985 in this book Der Petkau-Effekt und unsere strahlende Zukunft (The Petkau effect and our Radiating Future).

Petkau had been measuring, in the usual way, the radiation dose that would rupture a simulated artificial cell membrane. He found that 3500 rads delivered in 2 1/4 hours (26 rad/min = 15.5 Sv/h) would do it. Then, almost by chance, Petkau repeated the experiment with much weaker radiation and found that 0.7 rad delivered in 11 1/2 hours (1 millirad/min = 0.61 mSv/h) also ruptured the membrane. This was counter to the prevailing assumption of a linear relationship between total dose or dose rate and the consequences.

The radiation was of ionizing nature, and produced negative oxygen ions (free radicals). Those ions were more damaging to the simulated membrane in lower concentrations than higher (a somewhat counter-intuitive result in itself) because in the latter, they more readily recombine with each other instead of interfering with the membrane. The ion concentration directly correlated with the radiation dose rate and the composition had non-monotonic consequences.

== Radio-protective effects of superoxide dismutase ==
Petkau conducted further experiments with simulated cells in 1976 and found that the enzyme superoxide dismutase protected the cells from free radicals generated by ionizing radiation, obviating the effects seen in his earlier experiment. Petkau also discovered that superoxide dismutase was elevated in the leukocytes (white blood cells) in a sub-population of nuclear workers occupationally exposed to elevated radiation (ca. 10 mSv in 6 months), further supporting the hypothesis that superoxide dismutase is a radioprotective agent. Thus, Petkau's original 1972 experiment apparently revealed the potential effects of ionizing radiation on cells without natural radioprotective mechanisms in place.
