= Nuclear power in Ghana =

There is one nuclear reactor in Ghana, the Ghana Research Reactor, located in Accra. In operation since 1994, it is used for research, medical, and industrial purposes, but not for generating electricity.

== Purpose ==
The Ghana Atomic Energy Commission has been investigating the use of nuclear power and is a member of the International Nuclear Library Network. The commission is working with the International Atomic Energy Agency to implement nuclear power in Ghana as part of a wider project, Sustainable Energy Development for Sub-Saharan Africa. Ghana also has a Graduate School of Nuclear and Allied Sciences which trains undergraduate and postgraduate students in the techniques of nuclear science application in such areas as agriculture, medicine, and research. Both of these organizations focus more on research and the one research reactor located in Ghana than on nuclear power.

The government of Ghana is committed to the development of nuclear power as an environmentally-friendly energy source, and as of 2020 is undertaking preparatory steps for nuclear energy generation. President John Agyekum Kufuor supported the future building of nuclear power plants, seeing it as part of a solution to the country's energy problems. He initiated a Nuclear Power Committee to study the issue. In 2011, the director of the National Nuclear Research Institute, Benjamin Nyarko, also said he believed nuclear power could prevent future energy crises. The ministry has created a section to co-ordinate activities on the nuclear power project.

The Russian state-owned atomic energy corporation Rosatom signed a 'Memorandum of Understanding' with Ghana in August 2015 to develop a 1200 Megawatt reactor in Ghana- however, as the total energy production in the country at the time was only 2831MW, significant upgrades to the nation's energy grid would be necessary to accommodate it. In January 2017, the IAEA concluded an eight-day mission to Ghana to review the country's infrastructure and in preparation for selecting international vendors. A follow-up mission in October 2019 concluded that significant progress had been made, and that Ghana would soon be ready to discuss its options with international partners.

In 2022 government approved the plan to build a 1 GWe nuclear power plant with vendors invited from USA, Russia, Canada and South Korea and contract expected to be signed 2024-2026.

== See also ==
- Ghana Nuclear Society
- Ghana Atomic Energy Commission
- Nuclear power by country
