= Ghana Research Reactor-1 =

GHARR-1
- Accra, Ghana
- Operating institution: Ghana Atomic Energy Commission
- Location: Accra, Ghana
- Coordinates: 5°33′N 0°12′W
- Type: Miniature Neutron Source Reactor
- Power: 30 kW (thermal)

Construction and upkeep
- Construction began: 1994
- Time to construct: 1 year
- First criticality: December 17, 1994
- Annual upkeep cost: 1.5 M $US

Technical specifications
- Max thermal flux: 1.0^{12} s^{−1} cm^{−2}
- Max fast flux: 1.2·10^{12} s^{−1} cm^{−2}
- Cooling: Light water
- Neutron moderator: Light water
- Neutron reflector: Beryllium

The Ghana Research Reactor-1 (GHARR-1) is a nuclear research reactor located in Accra, Ghana and is the only nuclear reactor in the country. It is operated by the National Nuclear Research Institute, a sub-division of the Ghana Atomic Energy Commission. The reactor is a commercial version of the Chinese Miniature Neutron Source Reactor (MNSR) design. The reactor had its first criticality on December 17, 1994.

== Description ==
GHARR-1 is a light water reactor with a maximum thermal power of 30 kW, a maximum thermal flux of 10^{12} s^{−1}cm^{−2}, and a maximum fast flux of 1.2·10^{12} s^{−1}cm^{−2}. Beryllium is used as a reflector and the reactor is cooled by natural convection. Low enriched fuel is used, although the reactor was initially designed for 90.2% enriched uranium. The reactor core has 347 fuel rods.

The reactor is mainly used as a research tool, including for neutron activation analysis and reactor physics experiments. Research has indicated that GHARR-1 could be used to produce the radionuclide Technetium-99 in the future. It is also used for education of university students at the University of Ghana School of Nuclear and Allied Sciences.

== Conversion to low enriched uranium ==
The miniature neutron source reactor (MNSR) design originally operated with high enriched uranium (HEU), typically 90% uranium-235 or greater. In 2006, the International Atomic Energy Agency (IAEA) developed a Collaborative Research Project (CRP) and eventually a MNSR working group to coordinate conversion to low enriched uranium (LEU) fuel, typically defined as lower than 20% Uranium-235. HEU is associated with increased proliferation risks, as it can be more easily diverted to non-peaceful uses of atomic energy than LEU. The Ghana Atomic Energy Commission is a member of the MNSR working group, and has successfully transitioned GHARR-1 to low enriched fuel.

Ghana was the first country outside of China to successfully convert their MNSR reactor to LEU. The HEU core was removed in August 2016 and the operation was completed in 2017. The original nuclear fuel was UAl_{4} with Al-303-1 cladding while the new LEU fuel is uranium dioxide at 13% enrichment with Zircaloy-4 cladding.

== See also ==
- Nuclear energy in Ghana
- Research reactor
- Miniature neutron source reactor
