= Ghana Nuclear Society =

- Abbreviation: GNS
- Established: 2008
- Type: Non-profit Organization
- Legal status: Active
- Purpose: Advocate for Peaceful use of nuclear energy in Ghana
- Headquarters: Ghana Atomic Energy Commission (GAEC) in Accra, Republic of Ghana
- Key people: (Head)

The Ghana Nuclear Society (GNS) is a nonprofit organization that advocates for introducing nuclear energy in Ghana. It is headquartered at the Ghana Atomic Energy Commission (GAEC) in Accra. With the establishment of The Ghana Nuclear Society, Ghana has joined the league of those countries with National Nuclear Societies. Its head office is at the Ghana Atomic Energy Commission (GAEC) in Accra. The current national president is Prof. John Justice Fletcher. The society is not for science-inclined persons alone.

== History ==
The Ghana Nuclear Society received its certificate of incorporation on 13 May 2008. The society, which operates under the motto "Nuclear for Sustainable Energy Development," has an eight-member Advisory Panel that consults with the Board of Directors, which comprises 13 persons and four members from the National and Student Chapter Executives.

The society has created public information programs on nuclear matters, seminars, educational outreach programs, and interactive media presentations on local radio and television stations. It also publishes a newsletter that outlines issues relating to nuclear energy.

It plans educational programs at the SAMBEL Academy and the GAEC, and primary schools near the Graduate School of Nuclear and Allied Sciences at Atomic, Kwabeyna.

=== Notable milestones ===
- 2008 - First and Second Newsletter
- 2008 - First Annual General Meeting
- 2009 - Third Newsletter
- 2009 - Workshop on Human Resource Development for a nuclear power program.
- 2009 - Public Lecture on the theme ”The Role of Nuclear Power in attaining middle income status”.
- 2009 - Educational Outreach Programs for Schools.
- 2009 – Second Annual General
- 2010 - planning for the 2010 Energy Security for Africa.

== Society members ==
A list of the organizational structure of the society during the inaugural year:
Advisory Panel To The Board Of Directors

1) Prof. D. Adzei Bekoe - (Chairman, Council of state & Chairman, GAEC Board)

2) Prof. S.K.A. Danso - UG

3) Prof. Ebenezer Laing - UG

Board Of Directors

1) Prof J.J. Fletcher – President, GNS

2) Prof. B.J.B Nyarko – 1st Vice President, GNS

3) Dr. E. O. Darko – General Secretary, GNS

4) Prof. E.H.K. Akaho - Director General, GAEC

5) Prof. (Mrs.) Aba Andam - KNUST

6) Ms. Elizabeth Ohene - Minister of State in charge of Tertiary Education

7) Prof. J.H. Amuasi - Coordinator, SNAS-UG

8) Mr. Samuel Manteaw - Faculty of Law, UG

9) Prof. G.K. Tetteh - Physics Dept. U. G

10) Prof. Cyril Schandorf - HOD, Nuclear Safety and Security

11) Prof. G.Y.P. Klu - HOD, NUAG

12) Prof. (Mrs.) Victoria Appiah- Programme Coordinator, RAPR

13) Prof. P. O. Yeboah - Programme Coordinator, ENVP

14) Nana Prof. Kwesi Ayensu – CSIR

15) Prof. E. K. Osae – Physics Department, UG

16) Prof. E. K. Adjei – Physics Department, UG

17) Mr. Erwin Alhassan – Student Director

National Executives

1) President - Prof J.J. Fletcher (HOD, Nuclear Sciences and Applications, SNAS)

2) 1st Vice President - Prof. B.J.B Nyarko (Director, NNRI - GAEC)

3) 2nd Vice President – Dr. Isaac Newton Acquah (IAEA)

4) Coordinator for International Affairs - Prof. Yaw Serfor-Armah (Deputy Director General, GAEC)

5) General Secretary – Dr. E. O. Darko (Deputy Director, RPI)

6) Vice General Secretary – Mr. E.T. Glover (NNRI-GAEC)

7) National Organizer - Mr. I.J. Kwame Aboh (HOD, Physics Dept – GAEC)

8) Deputy National Organiser - Dr. S.B. Dampare (Ag. Reactor Manager – GAEC)

9) Treasurer - Dr. (Mrs.) Rose Boatin (Food Science Department, GAEC)

Co-ordinators For The Various Divisions

1) Dr. G.K. Banini Accelerator Applications

2) Prof. A.W. K. Kyere/Mr. Emmanuel Kwaku Nani Biology and Medicine

3) Prof. J. J. Fletcher Education and Training & IRPS

4) Prof. P.O. Yeboah Nuclear and Environmental Protection

5) Mr. E.T Glover Fuel Cycle and Waste Management

6) Dr. Shiloh Osae Isotopes and Radiation

7) Dr. K.A. Danso Materials Science and Technology

8) Prof. Kwesi Ayensu Mathematics and Computation

9) Prof. A.A. Golow Nuclear Criticality Safety

10) Dr. David Kuwornu Nuclear Power Plants

11) Prof. Y. Serfor-Armah Nuclear and Radiochemistry

12) Mr. S. Anim Sampong Research Reactor Operations

13) Dr. E. O. Darko Radiation Protection and Shielding & SRP

14) Prof. B.J.B Nyarko Reactor Physics and Engineering

15) Prof. E.H. K. Akaho Thermal Hydraulics

16) Prof. J.N. Tabiri Nuclear Agriculture and Radiation Processing Technology

17) Prof. G. Emi-Reynolds Radiation Safety and Security of Sources IRPA

18) Mrs. Margaret Ahiadeke Nuclear Law & Legislation

19) Prof. Cyril Schandorf Intl. Org. Of Medical Physicists

20) Prof. E.K. Agyei Nuclear Dating and Archeometry

21) Dr. (Mrs.) Mary Boadu CT and Mammography

Board Of Governors Of The National Student Chapter

1) Prof. J. J. Fletcher

2) Prof. Yaw Serfor-Armah

3) Dr. (Mrs.) Mary Boadu

4) Mr. Erwin Alhassan – President of the Chapter

5) Prof. P. O. Yeboah – Advisor to the Board of Governors

National Student Chapter Executives

1) President - Erwin Alhassan (Nuclear Engineering)

2) Vice-President - Anita Osei-Tutu (Environmental Protection)

3) General Secretary - Nana Ansah Adoo (Nuclear Engineering)

4) Deputy General Secretary - Alfred K. Anim (Nuclear and Radiochemistry)

5) Organizing Secretary - Andrew Sarkodie Appiah (Nuclear Agriculture)

6) Deputy Organizing Secretary - Frank Quarshie (Applied Nuclear Physics)

7) Publicity Secretary - Christian Adjei Amevi (Applied Nuclear Physics)

8) Deputy Publicity Secretary - David Kpeglo (Radiation Protection)

9) Treasurer - Matilda Owusu-Ansah (Nuclear Agriculture)

10) Deputy Treasurer - Christopher Yaw Bansah (Nuclear Engineering)

11) National Student Coordinator - Godfred Odame Duodu (Nuclear and Radiochemistry)

12) Deputy National Student Coordinator - Vincent Yao Agbodemegbe (Nuclear Engineering)

13) Kumasi Technical University President - Ebenezer Blay (Chemical Engineering)

Officers for the GNS Newsletter

Members of Editorial Board

1) Prof. J. J. Fletcher Editor

2) Prof. Cyril Schandorf Member

3) Dr. Shiloh Osae Member

4) Prof. J.N. Tabiri/Dr. Harry M. Amoatey Member

5) Dr. K.E. Danso Member

6) Mr. O.C. Oppong Member

7) Mr. Owiredu Gyampo Member

8) Mr. Stephen Yamoah Member

9) Mr. Ahialey Kingsford Member

Production Team

1) Mr. Richard Della

2) Mr. Daniel N. P. Dadebo

3) Mr. Godfred Odame Duodu

4) Mr. Amartey Edmund Okoe

5) Mr. Agbemava Sylvester Ebo

6) Ms. Ekua Mensimah

7) Mr. James Coffie

== 2010 African Conference ==
To enhance public acceptance and awareness of the Nuclear Power Option, the society organized a three-day conference under the theme: “Energy Security for Accelerated Development of the African Region.” This conference hoped to promote the acceptance of Nuclear Power in Africa by bringing together nuclear power vendors, reactor manufacturers, scientists and experts in the field to share knowledge with those in Africa.

== See also ==
- Nuclear energy in Ghana
- Ghana Atomic Energy Commission
