= Whiteshell Laboratories =

Nuclear research lab in Canada

The Whiteshell Laboratories, originally known as the Whiteshell Nuclear Research Establishment (WNRE) was an Atomic Energy of Canada (AECL) laboratory in Manitoba, northeast of Winnipeg. It was originally built as a home for the experimental WR-1 reactor, but over time came to host a variety of experimental systems, including a SLOWPOKE reactor (the SLOWPOKE Demonstration Reactor) and the Underground Research Laboratory to study nuclear waste disposal. Employment peaked in the early 1970s at about 1,300, but during the 1980s the experiments began to wind down, and in 2003 the decision was made to close the site. As of 2017 the site is undergoing decommissioning with a planned completion date in 2024. The decommissioning process for WR-1 involves transporting low-level nuclear waste to another Canadian Nuclear Laboratories (CNL) research site, Chalk River Laboratories in Deep River for containment, and encasing the reactor in concrete. The details of this process continue to be criticized, evaluated, and revised.

Decommissioning has been delayed due to ongoing regulatory issues and safety concerns. Currently, 233 comments on the draft Environmental Impact (EI) Assessment have been filed by diverse stakeholders, covering concerns about impacts on the Winnipeg River, radiological inventory, grout, and concrete, assessing the potential impact of earthquakes, and the need for guidance from the International Atomic Energy Agency (IAEA). In 2018 Sagkeeng First Nation (SFN) filed comments on the draft Environmental Impact Statement expressing concern that CNL failed to meaningfully consult SFN or adequately consider the Reactor-1 decommissioning project’s impacts on Treaty Rights. SFN also expressed concern that the Canadian Nuclear Safety Committee (CNSC) did not fulfill its obligation to the Canadian public to include them in the consultation process or adequately inform the public of the difficulties regarding the long-term management of radioactive wastes. In April 2023, decommissioning stopped completely due to deficient emergency preparedness procedures. Before the WR-1 decommissioning project can resume it must pass a multiphase restart program determined by the CNSC.

== History ==
=== Impetus ===
In the late 1950s, Atomic Energy Canada Limited (AECL) was planning an aggressive expansion of their experimental reactor designs. Among a number of proposals were versions of the heavy water reactor concept using alternate cooling arrangements including oil and boiling water. Their existing research site at the Chalk River Laboratories outside Ottawa appeared to be "at saturation" and too small to host all the planned experiments.

Considering their options, it was noted that only three provinces did not already host some sort of major federal lab, Newfoundland, Alberta and Manitoba. Newfoundland was eliminated, and Alberta already had an oil and gas industry and did not need more energy experiments. So, the decision was made to build in Manitoba. A preliminary site survey was carried out by Shawinigan Engineering (later part of Lavalin, today part of SNC-Lavalin). This was followed by meetings between AECL president J.L. Gray and Manitoba premier Dufferin Roblin.

In November 1959, Gray reported to the AECL board that a site on the Winnipeg River near the Seven Sisters Generating Station appeared to be suitable, along with a report from the federal government's housing agency that a new town site could be developed nearby. As the town was on the border of the Whiteshell Provincial Park, they named the lab Whiteshell. Manitoba was responsible for building a new bridge over the Winnipeg River and maintaining roads and other services. The town was developed as Pinawa, some distance to the southeast of the lab site.

=== Operations and projects ===
A deal was signed on 21 July 1960, creating the Whiteshell Nuclear Research Establishment (WNRE). The site was selected to host the Organic-Cooled Deuterium-Reactor Experiment (OCDRE), which later became known as WR-1. The design needed to be ready for construction to start in April 1962. General Electric Canada built the reactor over a period of three years ending in June 1965, and the reactor achieved criticality on 1 November 1965. The idea of an oil-cooled version of the CANDU was eventually abandoned in 1972, and from then on the WR-1 was operated at low power settings in a purely experimental program.

Whiteshell led the development of the SLOWPOKE reactor, starting in 1967. However, the first example, SLOWPOKE-1, was built at Chalk River and reached criticality in 1970. Over the next decade, several SLOWPOKE-2 reactors were sold around the world. A larger version, SLOWPOKE-3, was designed to supply 10,000 kW of hot water for district heating. The SLOWPOKE Demonstration Reactor (SDR) was built at Whiteshell in the 1980s to test this concept. The project was terminated after market interest in a nuclear heating system dwindled, and the SDR reactor at Whiteshell remained the only SLOWPOKE-3 reactor ever built. The construction of SDR at Whiteshell began 1985 and the reactor started operation 1987 and was shut down 1989 and was decommissioned. Other major facilities included shielded hot cell facilities, research laboratories and radioactive waste management areas including the Whiteshell Used Fuel Storage Facility.

In 1974, AECL began an extensive program in nuclear waste disposal. Their general program would involve burial to shield the fuel for about three hundred years while the majority of the gamma ray sources burned out, followed by a much longer period of physical isolation, not necessarily underground, to ensure the remaining radionuclides did not enter the water supply. AECL eventually decided the entire waste storage period should be underground. They found a suitable test site in Canadian Shield rock about 16 km northwest of the main Whiteshell site. This led to the construction of the Underground Research Laboratory (URL) whose primary concern was measuring the stability of hard-rock burial and potential groundwater exchange. The facility was decommissioned and deliberately flooded in 2010 to perform one final experiment to examine how mine seals work in a water environment.

Other programs on the main site included the Containment Test Facility (CTF) that examined potential hydrogen explosion sources in the CANDU reactors, and the Large-Scale Vented Combustion Test Facility (LSVCTF) that examined the actual explosions. Work at these sites concluded that by following some basic precautions the possibility of such an explosion in a CANDU was remote, and was used to test the Passive Autocatalytic Recombiners (PAR) system developed to scavenge trace amounts of hydrogen that might be present. The PAR would go on to be a successful export product for AECL.

Starting in 1984, Whiteshell began a collaboration with Los Alamos National Laboratory (LANL) to develop a nuclear battery for powering the North Warning System radars. This developed into an active generator using an Organic Rankine cycle generator.

Whiteshell ran a number of life sciences programs over the years. In 1966, two 19 m diameter plastic-lined "ponds" were built, one of which held a cesium-137 source. The ten-year program measured the spread of the caesium in the water, and by comparing the two ponds, its effect on the life forms in them. In 1973 they constructed the Field Irradiator Gamma (FIG) experiment, which fenced off a 1 km area of forest and exposed it to a powerful cesium-137 gamma radiation source in a central tower. The program ran until 1986, and concluded that it required 100,000 times the natural background to kill pine trees. A similar experiment started the next year in 1974, the ZEUS (Zoological Environment Under Stress) experiment, which set aside six 1-hectare meadow areas in 1974 and carried out long-term radioactive releases to measure the results. They were mostly interested in the effects on meadow voles, but did not reach any conclusions.

=== Closure ===
In 1998, AECL decided to close Whiteshell Laboratories and many of the facilities and activities have since ceased active operation. As of 2017, many of the original facilities are shut down, but work on WR-1 is ongoing. The site is planned to be entirely decommissioned by 2024.

==== Decommissioning Process ====
Whiteshell Laboratories is currently operated under a decommissioning license issued by the Canadian Nuclear Safety Committee (CNSC) on January 1, 2020. This license expires December 31, 2024. The reactor site is in a “storage-with-surveillance” phase during its ongoing decommissioning process. Canadian Nuclear Laboratories (CNL) has proposed an in situ decommissioning plan, meaning the reactor will be left in place. This method aligns with the International Atomic Energy Agency’s (IAEA) safety regulations for in-situ decommissioning. The IAEA does not identify all nuclear facilities to be eligible for in-situ decommissioning. Some factors that make WR-1 eligible for this process include its location underground, the fact that it does not contain large quantities of long-lived isotopes, and that it can easily be monitored during the post-closure control period. All radioactive liquids and fuels will be removed and transported to Chalk River Laboratories in Ottawa. The contaminated lower structure of the reactor will be encapsulated. This involves sealing the structure with grout and encasing it in concrete in order to contain any remaining radioactive material for a regulated period of control under CNL. All above ground structures will be removed, and a specialized cover will be installed over the sealed lower structure. In addition to these measures, several wells will be dug at strategic locations around the reactor site in order to monitor groundwater conditions.

==== Environmental Assessment ====
The Canadian Nuclear Safety Committee (CNSC) is legally obligated by the Impact Assessment Act (IAA) to review all proposed nuclear projects in Canada and carefully assess their potential impacts on nearby communities and the environment. The IAA requires the consideration of economic, social, health, and environmental impacts—both positive and negative of the project on question. The WR-1 decommissioning project also requires collaboration with the CNSC under the Nuclear Safety and Control Act (NSCA). While the Impact Assessment Agency of Canada requires Indigenous engagement in the early planning of the project, it is understood that the role of the CNSC is to provide technical knowledge to all parties involved. Impact Assessments (IA) are conducted under the authority of the Impact Assessment Agency, while Environmental Assessments (EA) in this case fall under the responsibility of the CNSC. The scope of assessment of an IA is broader, encompassing several facets of sustainability; health, gender, impacts on Indigenous rights, socioeconomic impacts, and environmental impacts. The scope of an EA is much narrower, only focusing on environmental factors. In order to clarify the collaborative responsibilities of the CNSC, a Memorandum of Understanding was created with the Impact Assessment Agency of Canada. In eight annexes it defines the responsibilities of both the CNSC and the IAA to be information sharing and notification, public participation and engagement, appointment of rosters and review panels, and Crown consultation.

The EA for the WR-1 project commenced May 16, 2016, and passed a completeness check on January 19, 2023, after CNL and CNSC evaluated comments made on the draft EA and consulting further with First Nations and the Manitoba Metis Federation. The next step of the review process involves technical review by the Federal, Provincial, Indigenous Review Team (FPIRT) that may last up to a year. Following this period, a public hearing will be conducted, and the final draft of the project will be drawn up.

==== Indigenous Involvement ====
The involvement of indigenous communities has been an ongoing challenge throughout the planning and assessment stages of the WR-1 decommissioning project. Indigenous consultation is required under the Impact Assessment Act (IAA) and the CNSC also has obligations to consult. Sagkeeng First Nation (SFN) and the Manitoba Metis Federation (MMF) have filed 29 comments on the draft Environment Assessment (EA) between 2017 and 2018. The main themes of these comments are Public and Aboriginal Consultation, CNSC Impartiality, and Decommissioning Waste Policies. In January 2015 SFN alerted CNL that they felt it was failing in its obligation to meaningfully include them in the consultation process, ignoring Treaty rights and community interests or concerns. SFN asserted that their right to free, prior, and informed consent demanded a more serious level of commitment from the Crown, citing inadequate funding in order to participate in the EA being conducted. Because of SFN’s proximity to the WR-1 site, their concerns of radioactive waste leaching into their environment remain high. SFN also stated that they were not informed of alternative methods to the in-situ decommissioning proposal and were excluded from the alternatives assessment process. CNL maintains that the proposed in-situ decommissioning method is low-risk compared to alternative methods such as continued storage and surveillance, and complete dismantling of the reactor, stating that risks of in-situ decommissioning are low when compared to the CNSC’s limits.

The WR-1 decommissioning project represents the first instance of permission being granted to dispose of nuclear waste in an irretrievable, permanent manner, and several shareholders including SFN remain concerned about the implications of structural failure resulting in contamination. Several commenters noted CNSC’s obligation to inform and consult not only First Nations, but members of the public as well. In response to these comments, CNL and CNSC reached out to SFN and other First Nations to discuss the potential impacts of the project and potential mitigation efforts. Polling in the Lac du Bonnet area was conducted to assess the sentiments of citizens regarding the proposal. On August 9, 2023, the MMF signed a five-year agreement with CNL to establish cooperation between the two organizations.

The agreement took two years to finalize, and the goal of the agreement is to facilitate a more productive relationship during the ongoing WR-1 decommissioning project, as well as any future nuclear projects. The agreement includes the creation of a liaison position within the MMF, as well as a yearly leadership meeting, and Red River Metis inclusion in an Indigenous Advisory Committee. A communications protocol has been developed for reportable events, and all communication between parties is to be conveyed in plain language. The MMF will be included in the environmental monitoring of the WR-1 site after decommissioning, facilitated by creation of the MMF-led Harvester Sample Collection Program. This program allows the MMF to steward a key portion of their traditional territory and creates opportunities for citizens to be involved in the WR-1 monitoring process.

== Timeline ==
Timeline for the facility:

- 1963 - AECL builds the Whiteshell Laboratories nuclear research facility.
- 1980 - AECL receives $40-million in funding to construct the Underground Research Laboratory (URL).
- 1983 - Construction of the URL begins.
- 1985 - URL opens
- 1998 - Work begins to decommission the Whiteshell laboratory
- 2010 - Underground Research Laboratory is officially closed
- 2015 - The decommissioning of WR-1 is planned to start
- 2016 - Environmental Assessment commences
- 2017-18 - Comment period for draft EA
- 2020 - Whiteshell Laboratories issued new decommissioning license by CNSC
- 2023 (January) - EA passes completeness check
- 2023 (August) - MMF and CNL sign 5-year agreement
- 2024 (December) - CNSC renews Whiteshell decommissioning site license for an additional 3 years

== Location ==
The main Whiteshell site is located at 50°10′42.3″N 96°03′38.7″W. The Underground Research Laboratory site is at 50°15′10.8″N 95°51′55.6″W.

== See also ==
- Atomic Energy of Canada Limited
- Petkau effect
