= Jean Talon Building =

Federal office building in Ottawa, Ontario, Canada

Coordinates: 45.406903°N 75.734961°W

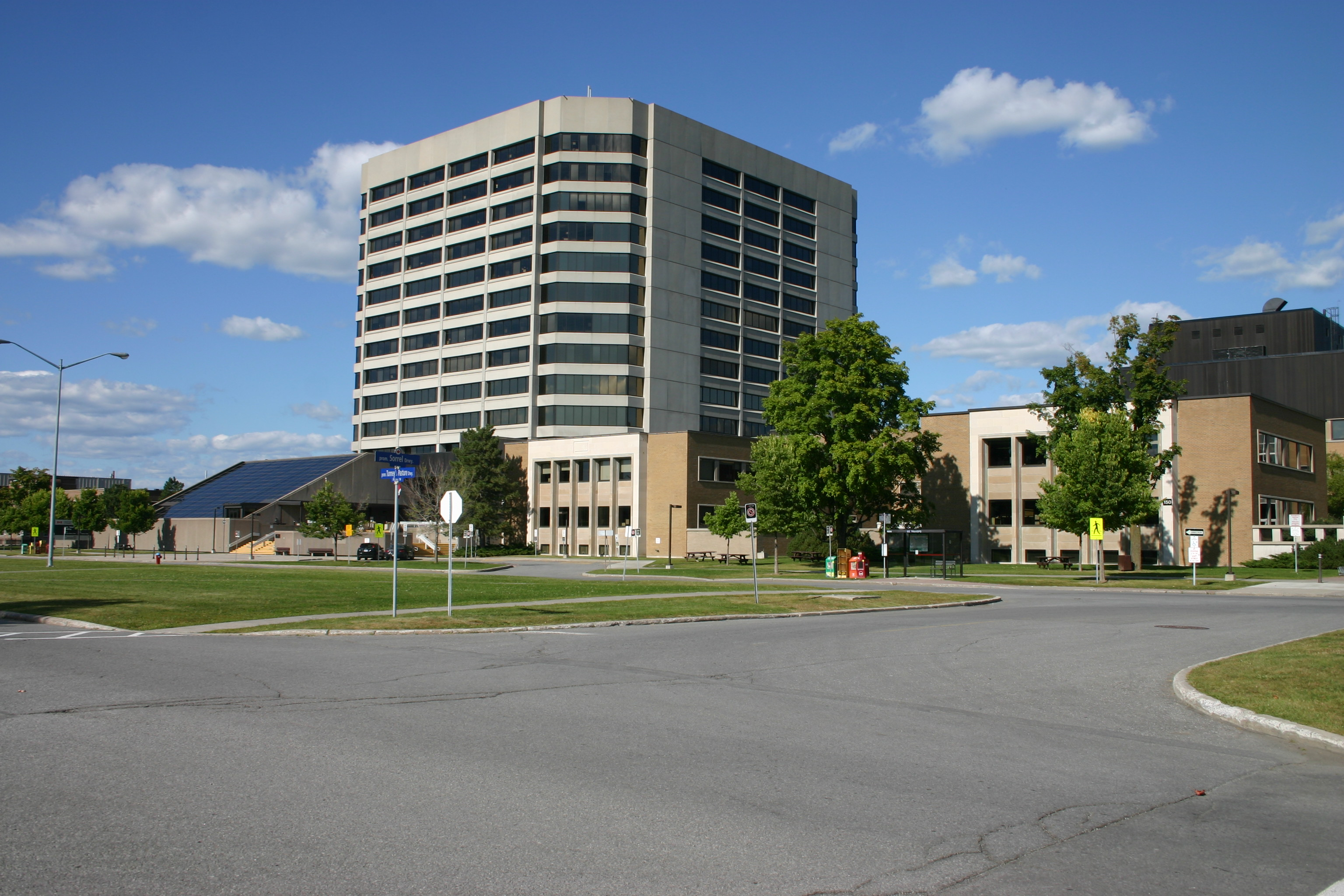
The Jean Talon Building

The Jean Talon Building is a federal government office building in Ottawa, Ontario, Canada. It forms part of the complex of three buildings, including the R. H. Coats Building and the Main Building, that houses the headquarters of Statistics Canada. Jean Talon was also the first intendant of the New France project.

Initially just named Census Building, it was renamed in honour of Jean Talon, the Intendant of New France who conducted the first census of what is now Canadian territory. The 13 storey Jean Talon Building was built in 1979 to accommodate census staff and to store paper, supplies and equipment needed to conduct Statistics Canada's surveys. The interior is graced with the Great Canadian Equalizer mural by artist Jerry Grey.

The building is located at 170 Tunney's Pasture Driveway, K1A 0T6, in the Tunney's Pasture area of Ottawa. Because of its large footprint, the Jean Talon Building has the largest gross floor area of all buildings in Tunney's Pasture.
