= Tunney's Pasture =

Government campus in Ottawa, Ontario, Canada

Coordinates: 45.406194°N 75.736978°W

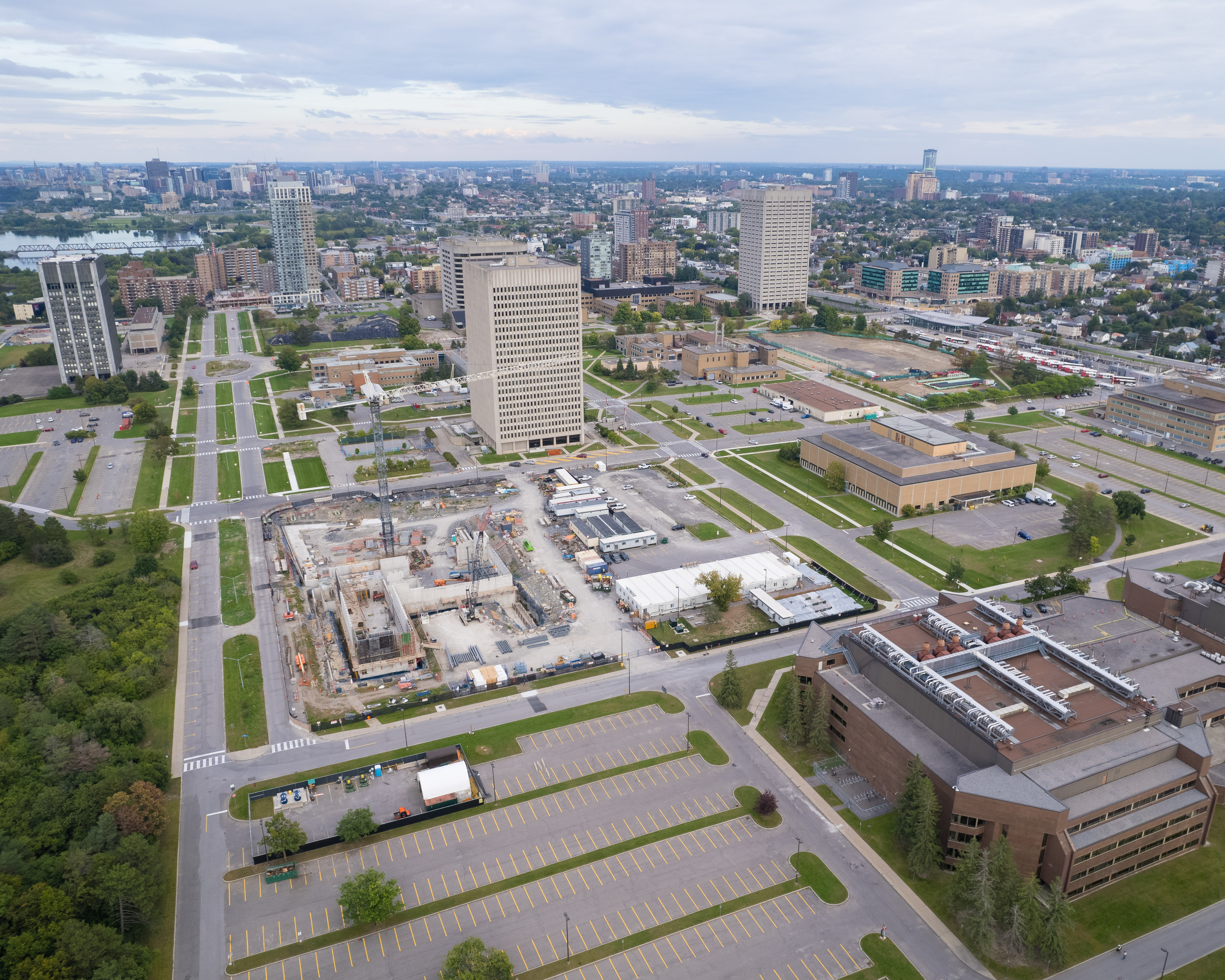
An aerial view of Tunney's Pasture in 2022, with the construction of the new central heating plant in the foreground

Tunney's Pasture is a 49-hectare (121-acre) campus in the Canadian capital of Ottawa, Ontario, that is exclusively developed for federal government buildings. It is bordered by Scott Street to the south, Parkdale Avenue to the east, the Kichi Zibi Mikan to the north, and the Champlain Park neighbourhood to the west. While strictly speaking it is confined to this area, people living in the vicinity of it will often call the wider neighbourhood Tunney's Pasture.

The complex is served by Tunney's Pasture station, a stop on the Transitway bus rapid transit system and the western terminus on Line 1 of Ottawa's O-Train light rail system.

== History ==
Before development, this area, officially known as "Lot 35, Concession A, Township of Nepean", was used as a farmer's pasture, as the name still indicates, and named after Anthony Tunney who pastured his cows on the empty land.

As a young man, Anthony Tunney emigrated from Ireland to Ottawa in 1867 and married and built a house at 201 Parkdale Avenue. The owner of the pasture, the Ottawa Lumber Merchants' Association, hired Tunney to be the caretaker of the land and allowed him to graze his cattle in the field. Although Tunney was able to claim ownership because he had been paying the taxes on the property, he never did so. In 1947, the government expropriated the property, paying approximately $700,000 as settlement to the property owners.

In 1950, the property became part of the Greber Plan that envisioned it as a government employment centre within a quiet and secure park-like campus. From the 1950s to the 1960s, 18 low-rise buildings were constructed with modern, classical-inspired architecture and similar materials, massing, and scale. Most of these combined research and office functionality under one roof. Starting in the 1970s however, new buildings and additions were built that deviated from Gréber's vision, introducing high-rise office towers, new architectural styles, and cladding materials to the site. In 1971, Atomic Energy of Canada Limited built a SLOWPOKE-2 nuclear reactor on the site, which was moved to another site in 1984.

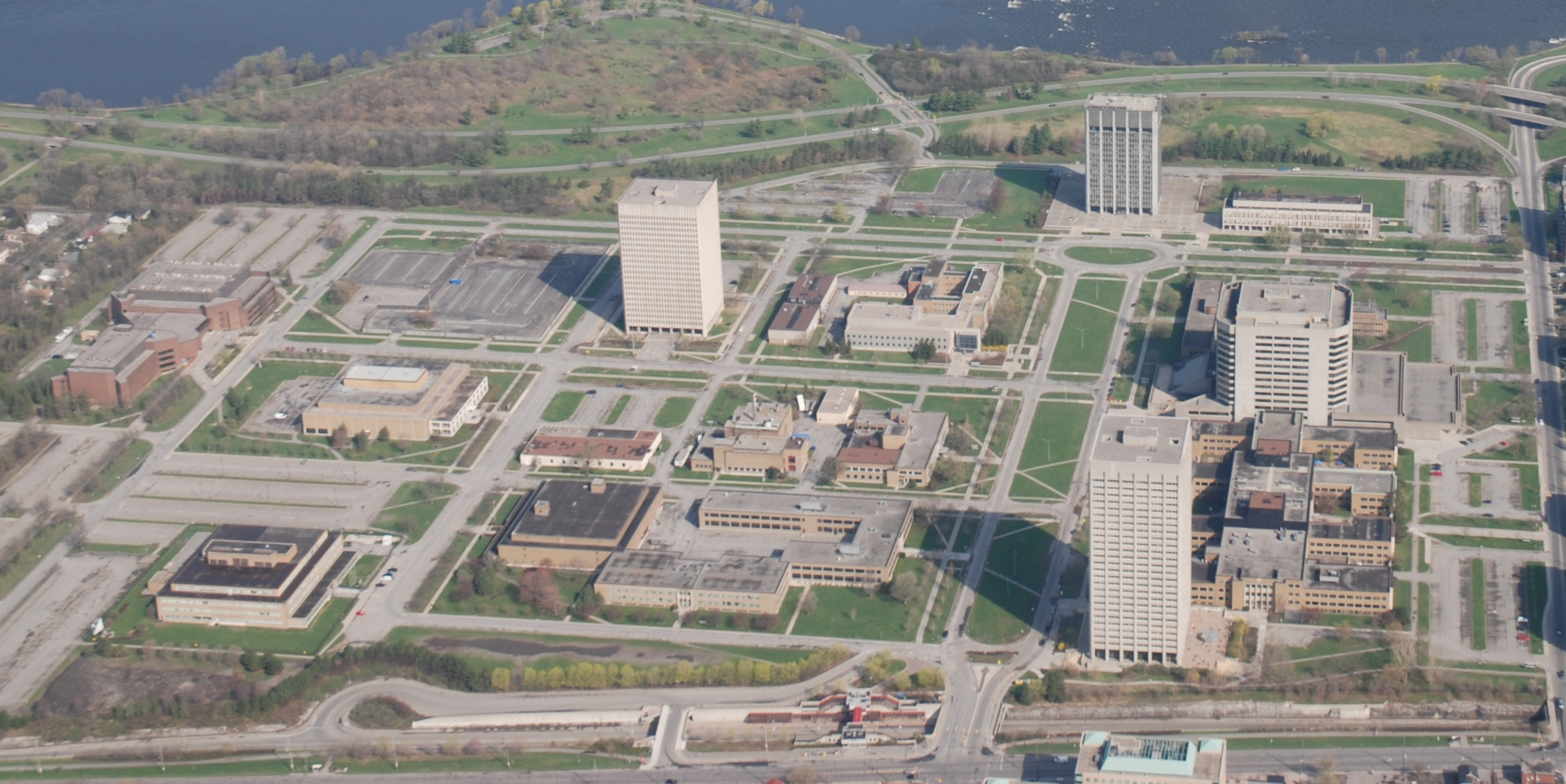
Tunney's Pasture in 2008, before demolition of original buildings

Little development took place in the 1990s, 2000s, and 2010s. By 2011, most buildings were considered outdated and the site under-used. Public Works and Government Services Canada has therefore initiated a plan to redevelop the campus with new high-rise buildings and mixed-use commercial and residential space over a 25-year period. In all, the plan aims to double the number of federal employees to 20,000 and add between 800 and 1000 residential units.

In 2020, modernization began with the construction of a wholly-new central heating and cooling plant that will be more energy efficient and complete with green roof. It will replace the existing one by 2025.

== List of original buildings ==
Various ministries and agencies occupy offices, in whole or in part, in Tunney's Pasture.

Image	Name	Building #	Address	Year built	Year demolished	Primary tenant	Floor area (m²)
	R. H. Coats Building	Building 1	100 Tunney's Pasture Driveway	1974	n/a	Statistics Canada	40,829
	Main Building	Building 3	150 Tunney's Pasture Driveway	1952	n/a	Statistics Canada	39,237
	Jean Talon Building	Building 5	170 Tunney's Pasture Driveway	1979	n/a	Statistics Canada	60,906
	Brooke Claxton Building	Building 9	70 Columbine Driveway	1964	n/a	Health Canada	20,972
	Jeanne Mance Building	Building 19	200 Eglantine Driveway	1970	n/a	Health Canada	32,755
	Laboratory Centre for Disease Control	Building 6	100 Eglantine Driveway	1954	n/a	Health Canada	11,247
	Health Protection Building	Building 7	200 Tunney's Pasture Driveway	1956	2020-2021	Health Canada	10,317
	Environmental Health Building	Building 8	50 Colombine Driveway	1965	2023	Health Canada	7,008
	Animal Breeding Building	Building 12	100 Chardon Driveway	1962	2018	Health Canada	3,073
	Sir Frederick G Banting Research Centre	Building 22	251 Sir Frederick Banting Driveway	1978	n/a	Health Canada	34,028
	Finance Building	Building 2	101 Tunney's Pasture Driveway	1952	2022	Health Canada	7,203
	Occupational Health Unit Building	Building 17	51 Chardon Driveway	1956	n/a	Health Canada	1,965
	Virus Laboratory	Building 10	Columbine Driveway	1954	2002-2005	Health Canada	
	General Records Centre	Building 15	130 Goldenrod Driveway	1957	2018	Library and Archives Canada	17,044
	Personnel Records Centre	Building 18	161 Goldenrod Driveway	1965	n/a	Library and Archives Canada	19,498
	Standards Building	Building 4	151 Tunney's Pasture Driveway	1954	n/a	Measurement Canada	4,463
	National Defence Data Centre	Building 16	101 Goldenrod Driveway	1962	n/a	Department of National Defence	16,602
	Finance Annex	Building 14	100 Yarrow Driveway	1958	2022	Geological Survey of Canada	6,481
	Central Heating and Cooling Plant	Building 13	50 Chardon Driveway	1952	n/a		1,719
	Butler Hut	Building 11	150 Chardon Driveway	1955	n/a		303
	Atomic Energy of Canada Building	Building 20	20 Goldenrod Driveway	1955	1999-2002	Atomic Energy of Canada Limited	
	Eldorado Nuclear Building	Building 21		unknown	1990s		
