= 1666 census of New France =

Census in Canada

First Census of New France
- 1666; 360 years ago

General information
- Country: New France, Kingdom of France
- Website: statcan.gc.ca

Results
- Total population: 3,215
- Most populous settlement: Montreal (625)
- Least populous settlement: Lauzon (13)

The 1666 census of New France was the first census conducted in Canada (and also North America) for the Kingdom of France. It was organized by Jean Talon, the first Intendant of New France, between 1665 and 1666.

Talon and the French Minister of the Marine Jean-Baptiste Colbert had brought the colony of New France under direct royal control in 1663, and Colbert wished to make it the centre of the French colonial empire. To do this he needed to know the state of the population so that the economic and industrial basis of the colony could be expanded. The next New France census was in 1667.

== Collection ==
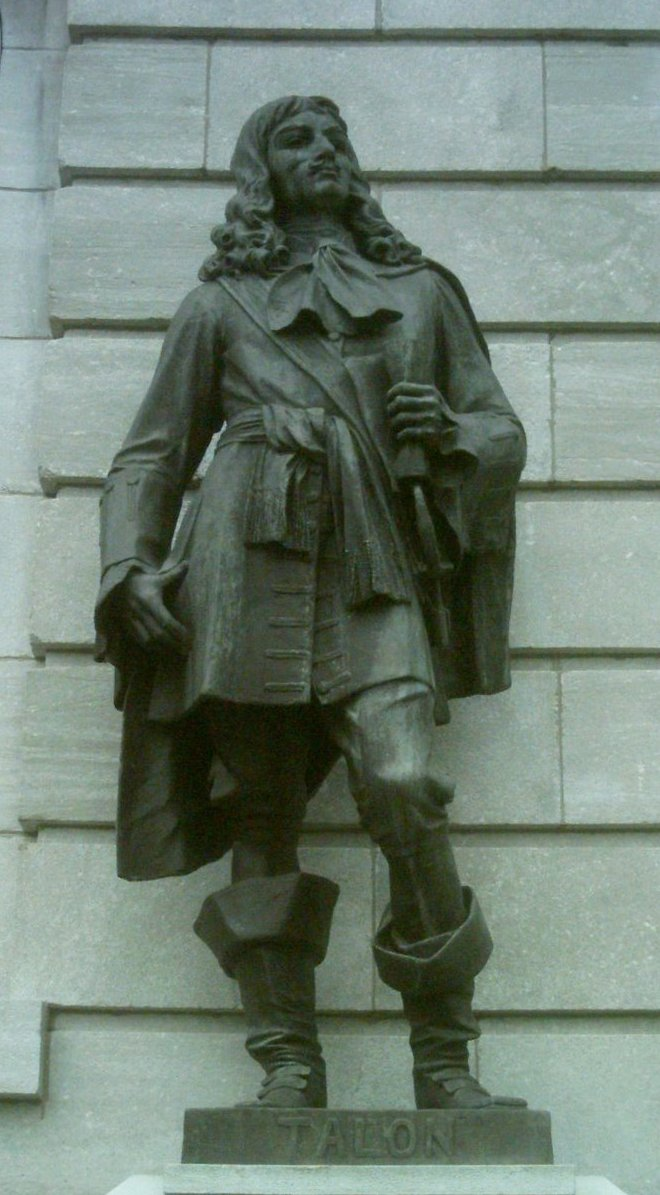
Jean Talon, served as the first Intendant of New France.

Jean-Talon conducted the census largely by himself, travelling door-to-door among the settlements of New France. He did not include Indigenous inhabitants of the colony, or the religious orders such as the Jesuits or Recollets.

== Results ==
According to Talon's census there were 3,215 people in New France, and 538 separate families. The census showed a difference in the number of men at 2,034 versus 1,181 women. Children and unwedded adults were grouped together; there were 2,154 of these, while only 1,019 people were married (42 were widowed). A total of 625 people lived in Montreal, the largest settlement; 547 people lived in Quebec; and 455 lived in Trois-Rivières. The largest single age group, 21- to 30-year-olds, numbered 842. 763 people were professionals of some kind, and 401 of these were servants, while 16 were listed as "gentlemen of means".

== Other censuses ==
After the 1665–1666 census the next census was conducted in 1667, a total of 36 full censuses and 9 partial censuses taken during the French regime until 1763.

List of censuses.

- 1667 Population of New France
- 1671 Population of Acadia
- 1681 Population of New France
- 1685 Population of New France
- 1686 Population of Acadia
- 1687 French Population of Newfoundland
- 1688 Population of New France

== See also ==
- French Canadians
- Population of New France
