= Ghana Atomic Energy Commission =

Ghanaian scientific organization

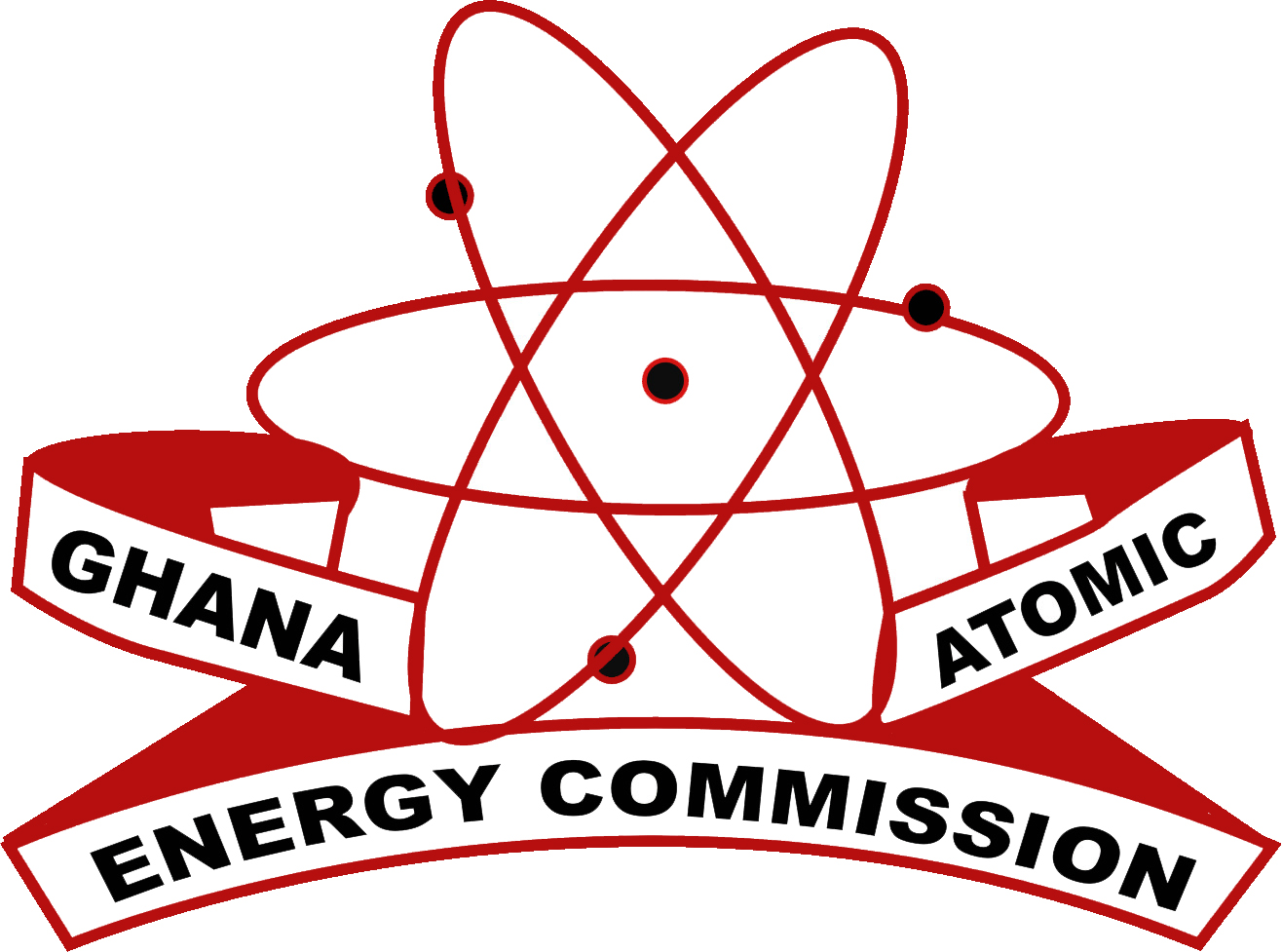
- The GAEC flag
- Abbreviation: GAEC
- Established: 1952
- Type: Organization
- Legal status: Active
- Headquarters: Republic of Ghana
- Key people: (Head)
- Website: www.gaec.gov.gh

The Ghana Atomic Energy Commission (GAEC) is the state organization in Ghana involved with surveillance for the use of nuclear energy in Ghana. It is similar in aim to the Ghana Nuclear Society (GNS), with the difference being that the GNS is a nonprofit organization, whereas the GAEC is part of the parliament of Ghana. Its primary objectives were set out by the parliament act 588, which involve investigating the use of nuclear energy for Ghana and supporting research and development both in Ghana and abroad.

== History ==
Ghana Atomic Energy Commission (GAEC), was formed way back as 1952 when radioisotopes began in Ghana. Around that time, radio-strontium was what used in experiments. In the year 1958, the Department of physics of the University College of the Gold Coast, which is now (University of Ghana, Legon) started a radioactive fallout monitoring service on behalf of the Defense Ministry. In the year 1961, work in radioisotopes in Ghana had gained grounds in most of the Government institutions to explain establishment of a Radioisotope Unit.

== Sub-Divisions ==
- National Nuclear Research Institute (NNRI): The NNRI conducts nuclear science and technology researches for industry, technology,health and the environment.
- School of Nuclear and Allied Sciences (SNAS):

Responsible for preservation, maintenance and enhancement of nuclear knowledge in Ghana and Africa through the provision of high-quality teaching, research, entrepreneurship training, service and development of postgraduate programmes in the nuclear sciences and technology.

- Radiation Protection Institute (RPI):

Authorize, inspect and control all activities and practices involving sealed radiation sources, ionizing radiation and other sources, radioactive materials and x-rays used in hospitals in Ghana. Implementation of safety culture by providing adequate human resource development in radiation and waste safety for management and operating organizations. Conduct research and technical services in radiation and waste safety.

- Biotechnology and Nuclear Agriculture Research Institute (BNARI):

Established in 1993, it uses biotechnology and nuclear techniques to improve agriculture, food security, livestock and environmental management.

- Radiological and Medical Sciences Research Institute (RAMSRI):

This division focuses on medical research, diagnosis,and applying nuclear technology to healthcare solutions like cancer treatments.

- Ghana Space Science and Technology Institute (GSSTI):

It manages space science, satellite data processing and also operates the radio astronomy observatory of the GAEC.

- Nuclear Power Institute (NPI) :

It assesses safety measures, coordinates national planning and technical steps to introduces nuclear energy into Ghana's power grid.

ADMINISTRATIVE DIRECTORATES

- Administrative Wing: it manages the day-to-day activities of the organization.
- Financial and Accounting Wing: it manages the budget allocations and handles financial management.
- Auditory Wing: oversees the internal compliance and corporate auditing.
- Human Resource Wing: handles training, staff recruitment, counselling and the general welfare of the organization.
- Commercialization & Communication Directorate: made up of the marketers,technicians, public relation officers and the IT services.

INITIATIVES TAKEN BY GAEC SINCE INDEPENDENCE

The GAEC since independence has initiated and launched several vital interventions to utilize peaceful nuclear science and technology for socio-economic development. The GAEC was established in 1963 under the Ghana Nuclear Reactor Project (GNRP).

1. Nuclear Power Generation Roadmap
- Nuclear Power Institute: GAEC established the specialized institute to oversee technical planning, safety planning, safety audits and grid integration steps for bringing clean atomic energy to Ghana.
- The Research Reactor: I also operationalized the Ghana Research Reactor(GHARR-1) in 1994. gaec.gov.gh
- Reactor Conversion: Partnered with International Atomic Energy Agency (IAEA), to convert the GHARR-1 from highly enriched uranium, advancing international non- proliferation safety standards.
- 2. Agriculture and Food Security Initiatives
- Food Irradiation Technology: GAEC operates a commercial Gamma Irradiation Facility to sterilize medical equipment and extend the shelf life of agriculture exports, minimizing post-harvest losses for local farmers.
- Eco- Friendly Waste and Pest Management: The commission spearheads programs utilizing Black Soldier Fly technology for organic waste recycling and employs nuclear-related techniques to control mosquito populations across the country.
- Biotechnology and Mutation Breeding: Managed by the BNARI, GAEC uses the tissue culture and the radiation-induced mutation breeding to engineer resilient crop varieties with higher yields.

3. Education,Space Science and AI Ventures

- Human Capital Development: The GAEC in partnership with the University of Ghana, established the School of Nuclear and Allied Sciences (SNAS)School of Nuclear and Allied Sciences to train postgraduates students from across the Sub-Saharan Africa in nuclear safety,engineering and medical physics.
- Space Science and the Satellite Processing: through the Ghana Space Science and Technology Centre, GAEC converts old telecommunication infrastructure into radio astronomy observatories and processes satellite imagery for national development tracking.
- Artificial Intelligence and Robotics: GAEC actively integrates machine learning workshops for tertiary students and empowers Junior High School groups through localized AI and robotics training.

4. Medical and Public Health Interventions

- Nuclear Medicine and Cancer Care: Through the Radiological and Medical Sciences Research Institute (RAMSRI),GAEC introduces advanced Radiotherapy and Diagnostic molecular biology techniques to optimize cancer treatments in Ghana.
- Public Health Campaigns: RAMSRI regularly conducts nationwide diagnostic screening and public health awareness engagements, focusing on prostate and breast cancers.
- Radiation Safety Monitoring: The Radiation Protection Institute monitors occupational exposure to ionizing radiation, registers telecom masts and conducts continuous environmental radiation safety for training for industrial personnel.

ACHIEVEMENTS OF THE GAEC

The Ghana Atomic Energy Commission has achieved some key successes which includes

i. safe operation of the GHARR-1: which allows the core conversion system to successfully converts the GHARR-1 core from Highly Enriched Uranium (HEU) to Low Enriched Uranium (LEW) so it matches global security goals.

ii. the establishment of the School of Nuclear and Allied Sciences(SNAS): its foundation partnered with the international Atomic Energy Agency to set up the school of Nuclear and Allied Sciences which trains regional experts across the Sub-Saharan Africa.

iii. advancements in nuclear medicine and agricultural mutation breeding: this includes the diagnostic standards which formulates Ghana's first national Diagnostic Reference Levels to optimize patient safety in Medical x-ray and radiology and launched specialized master's program in nuclear nutrition techniques in public health and advanced mutation breeding and tissue to improve crop yields alongside molecular studies tackling human papillomavirus and tuberculosis in food and research.

KEYS LAWS AFFECTING GAEC

1. Atomic Energy Commission (Amendment) Law, 1993 (PNDCL 308)
- Amended the original 1963 Act
- Also allowed GAEC to establish additional research institutes which includes

- Biotechnology and Nuclear Agriculture Research Institutes (BNARI)

- Radiation Protection Institute (RPI)

2.Atomic Energy Commission Act,2000 (Act 588)

- it repealed the original Act 204 of 1963 and became the principal law governing GAEC, reorganized the commission, and also defined GEAC's functions, power, funding, governance, commercialization of research and authority to recommend regulations on nuclear and radiation safety.

3. Nuclear Regulatory Authority Act, 2015 (Act 895)

- It established the nuclear regulatory authority as an independent regulator.
- Transferred regulatory functions for nuclear and radiation safety from GAEC to the NRA, allowing GAEC to focus on research,development, and peaceful applications of nuclear science.

== See also ==
- Nuclear power in Ghana
- Nuclear power by country
