= R. H. Coats Building =

Coordinates: 45.404817°N 75.734189°W

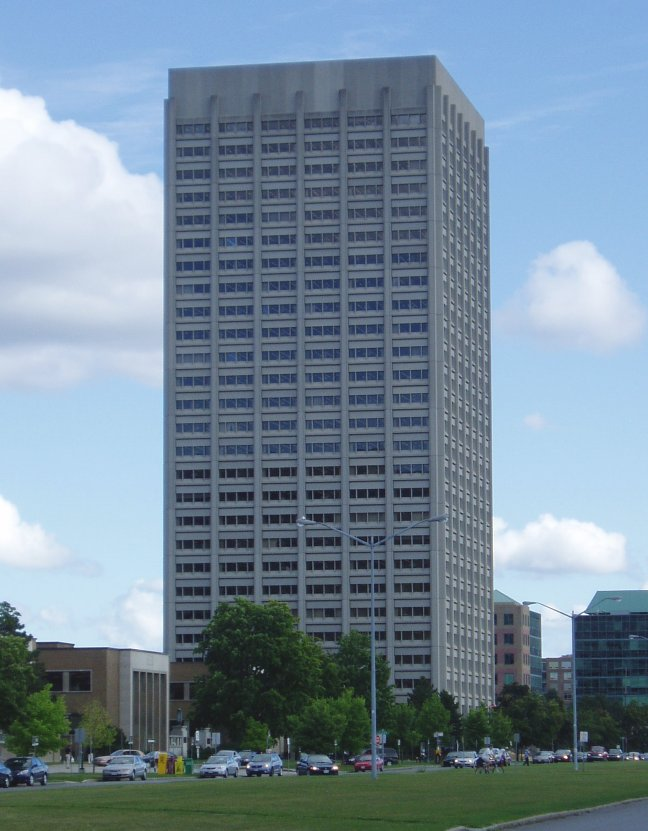
- Interactive map of the R. H. Coats Building area

General information
- Type: Office building
- Architectural style: International, brutalist
- Location: Ottawa, Ontario, Canada, 100 Tunney's Pasture Driveway
- Current tenants: Statistics Canada, Alterna Savings
- Completed: 1976

Height
- Height: 99 m (325 ft)

The R.H. Coats Building is a government office building located in the Tunney's Pasture government office complex in Ottawa, Ontario, Canada. It is situated near the intersection of Holland Avenue and Scott Street, beside Tunney's Pasture Station.

Named after Canada's first Dominion Statistician, Robert H. Coats (1874–1960), the R.H. Coats Building was completed in 1976 by the architectural firm Ogilvie and Hogg. It is 26 stories and 99 m in height, making it the tallest tower in Tunney's Pasture. Peregrine falcons are sometimes sighted on the top of this building. It houses Statistics Canada offices.

== See also ==
- List of Ottawa-Gatineau's 10 tallest skyscrapers
- Architecture of Ottawa
