= Jean-Talon Market =

Farmer's market in Montreal

Jean Talon Market
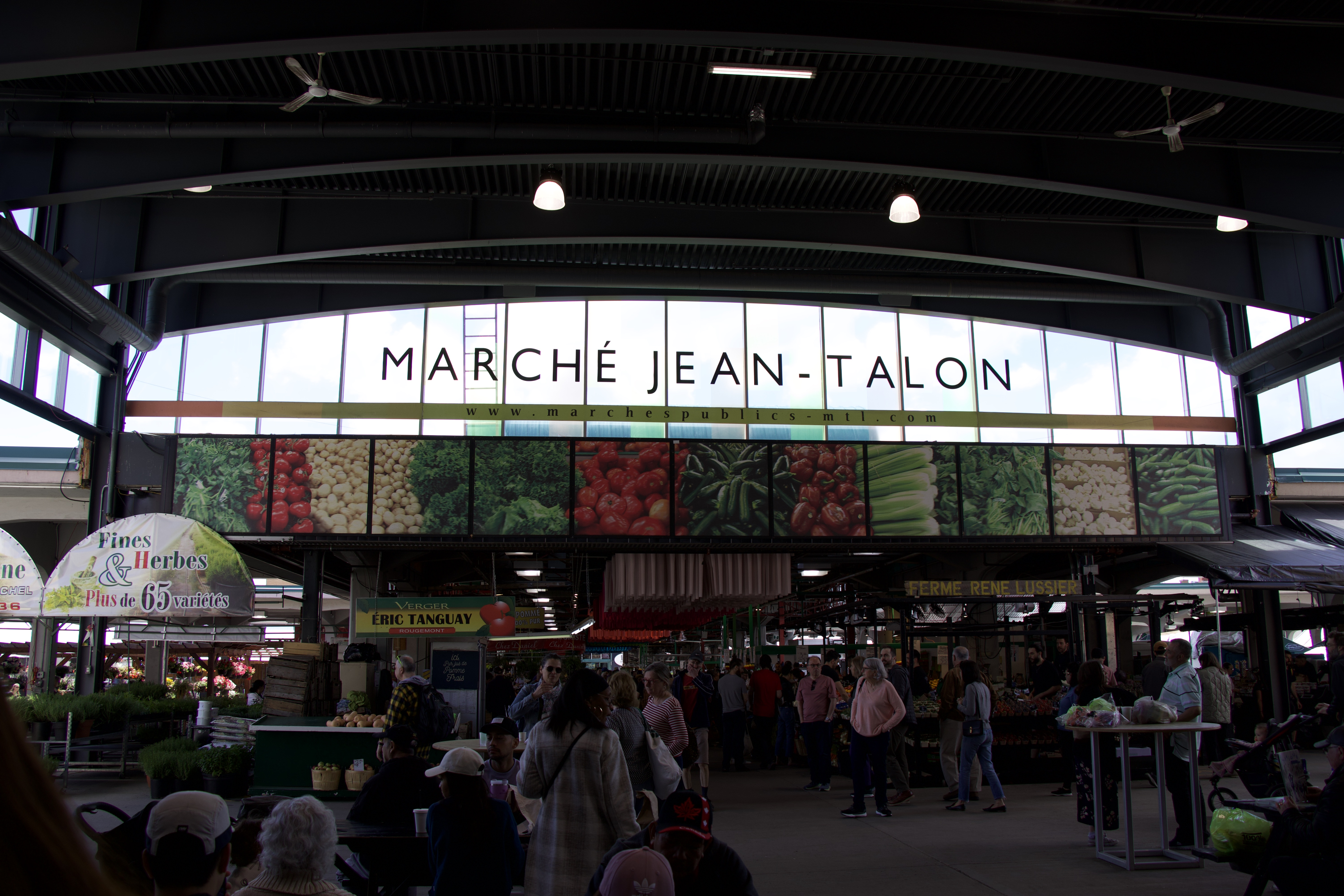
- Inside the market
- Interactive map of the Jean Talon Market area

General information
- Location: Henri Julien Avenue
- Coordinates: 45.535889°N 73.615222°W
- Opened: 1933; 93 years ago

Other information
- Public transit: Montreal Metro: Jean-Talon; De Castelnau

Jean-Talon Market is a farmer's market in Montreal, Quebec, Canada. Located in the Little Italy district, the market is bordered by Jean-Talon Street to the north, Mozart Ave. to the south, Casgrain Ave. to the west and Henri-Julien Ave. to the east. It contains two city-maintained streets both called Place du Marché du Nord.

It is the largest market in Montreal and one of the largest open-air markets in North America.

== History ==
The market was opened to the public in 1933 while Camillien Houde was the city mayor. Before that, the space the market now occupies was a lacrosse field for the "Shamrock Lacrosse Grounds" club.

The market's single building (the chalet) quickly became the focal point for development of the area around it. From the opening until 1961, the chalet was used as a terminal for buses heading to the neighbouring city of Laval. Between 1961 and 1970 a municipal library and a social services centre replaced the bus station. Since then, the space was occupied by administrative offices.

Major renovations were undertaken in 2004 to handle the crowds that populate the market during the summer months. An underground parking lot was constructed, and an above ground structure was built over the underground parking area, to host 20 specialty boutiques.

== Activities ==
The market is open year-round, even during Montreal's severe winters, although during this time walls are placed around the central section of the market while outdoor areas remain vacant. During the peak summer period, between May and October, its open-air arcades are occupied by about 300 vendors, mostly farmers from the countryside around Montreal.

The open air market is surrounded by other food businesses: meat, fish and cheese stores, bulk food emporia, dealers in spices and imported goods, bakeries, restaurants and a branch of the SAQ, among others.

Stores surrounding the open-air market include:

- Léopoldo Fruit Store
- La Fromagerie Hamel
- William J. Walter boucherie
- Joe la Croûte boulangerie
- Maison de thé Camellia Sinensis
- Terra Bella Organic Store

Since July 15, 2006 vehicles are banned from circulating inside the market's streets during the summer weekends.

== Gallery ==
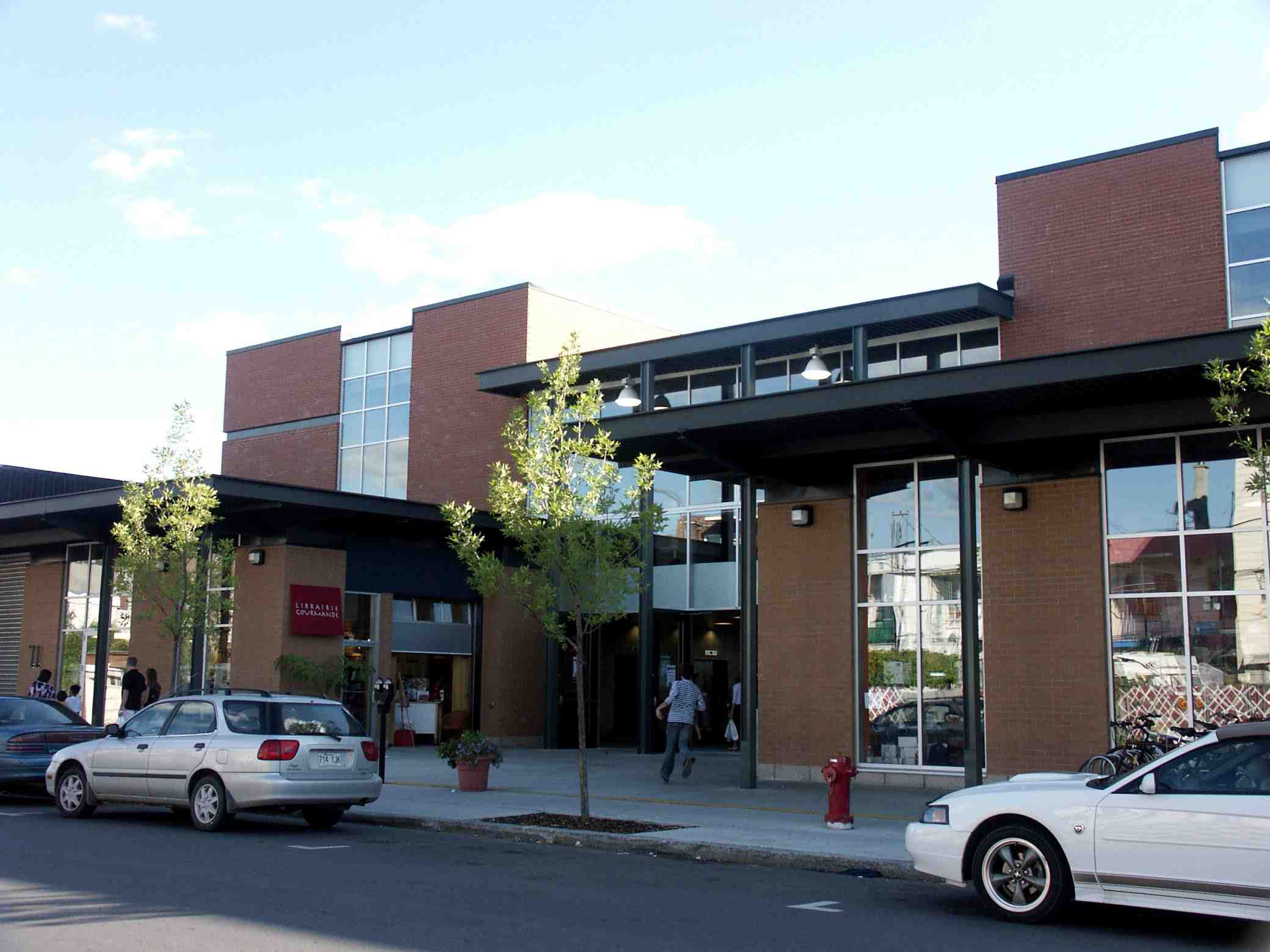
New wing

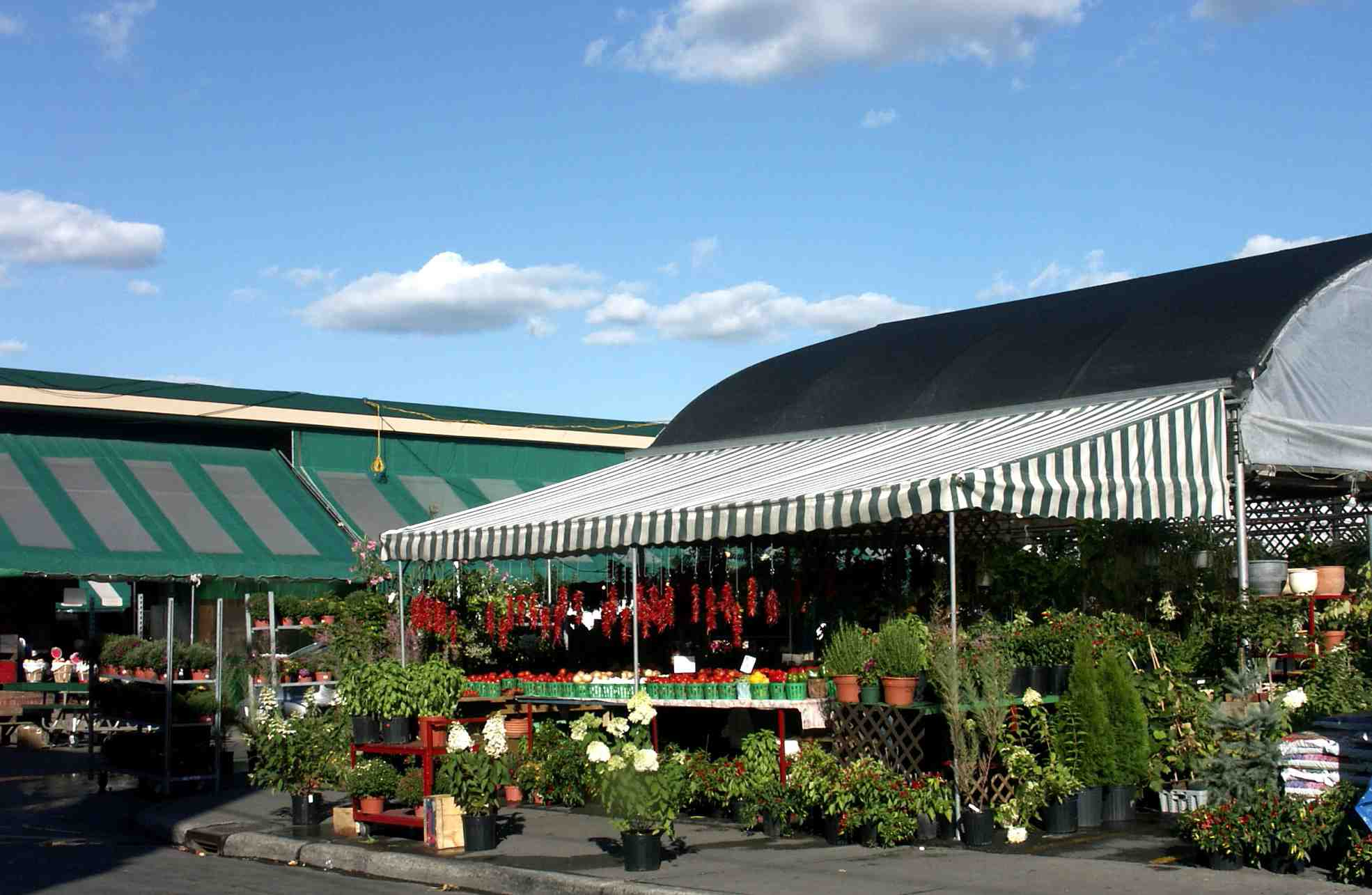
Exterior view of the northwest corner of the market

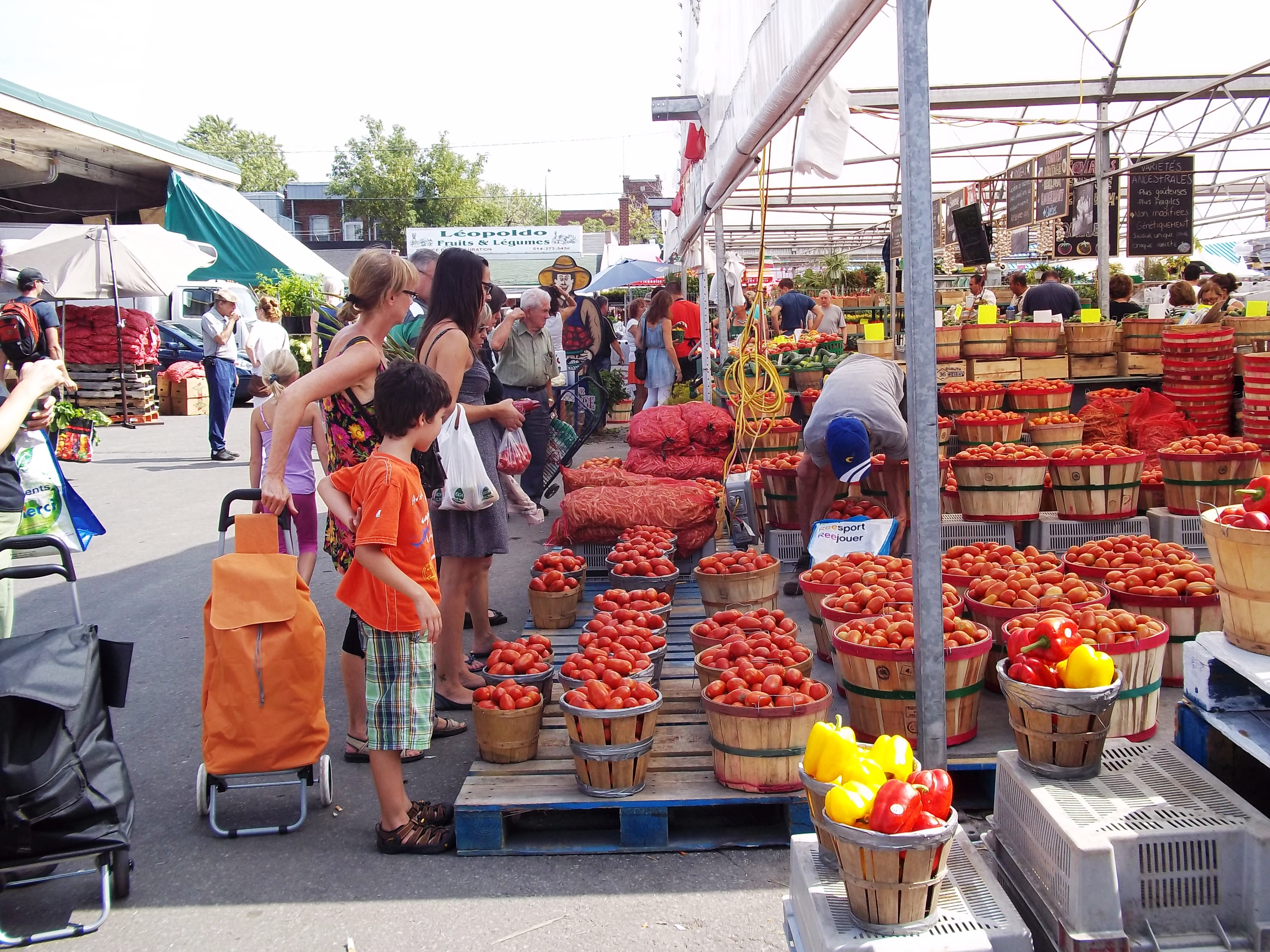
Exterior shopping area

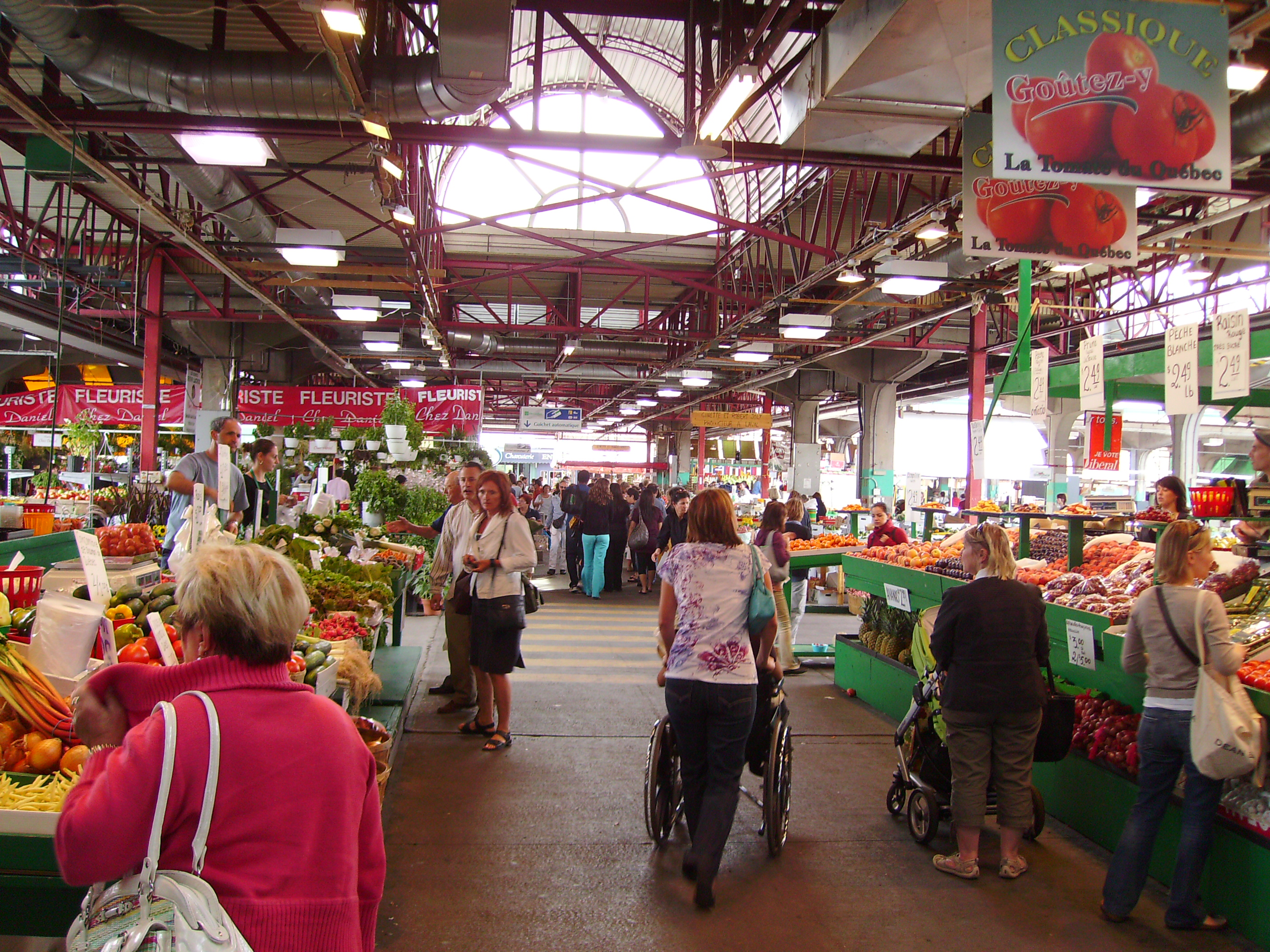
Interior shopping area

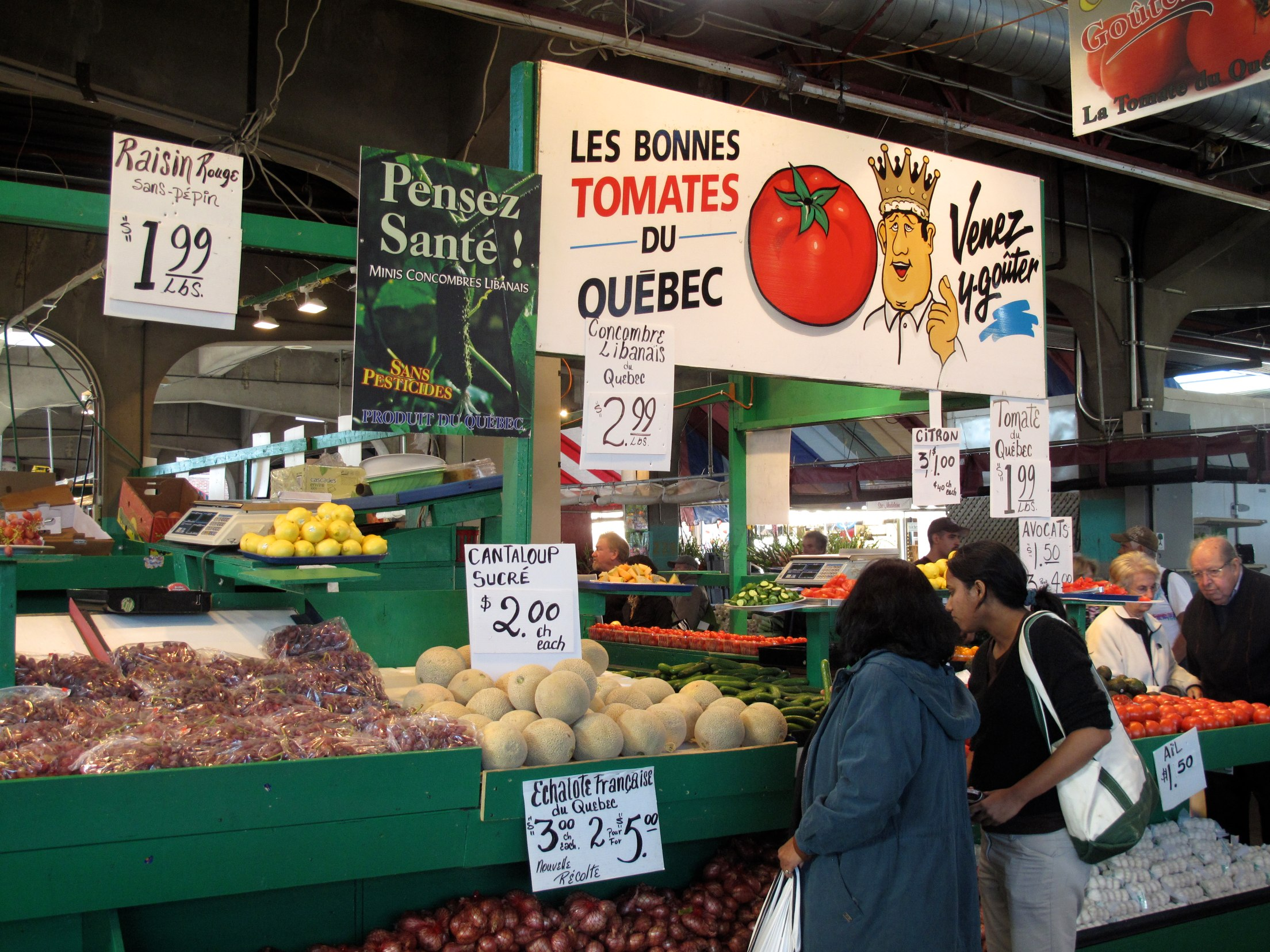
Tomato stand

== See also ==
- Atwater Market
