= China Institute of Atomic Energy =

Coordinates: 39.7425°N 116.0414°E

The China Institute of Atomic Energy or CIAE (Chinese: 中国原子能科学研究院), formerly the Institute of Atomic Energy of the Chinese Academy of Sciences, is the main research institute of the China National Nuclear Corporation (CNNC). Founded in 1950, it conducts research in the fields of nuclear physics, nuclear engineering, radiochemistry, and in the development of nuclear technology.

== See also ==
- Nuclear power in China
