= Little Maghreb =

Little Maghreb Petit Maghreb
- Neighbourhood
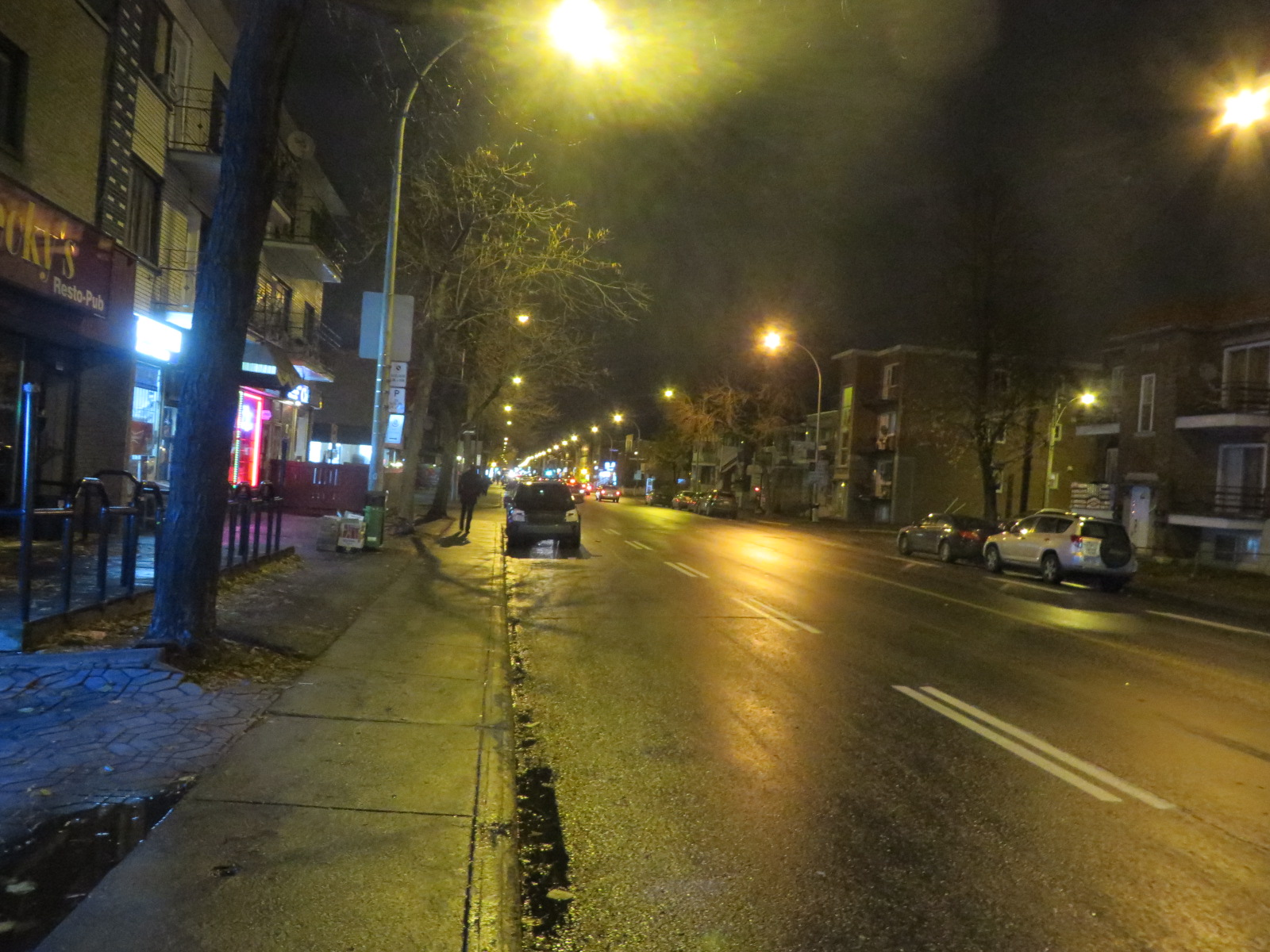
- Little Maghreb in 2016

- Location of Downtown Montreal
- Coordinates: 45.562930°N 73.594753°W
- Country: Canada
- Province: Quebec
- City: Montreal
- Borough: Villeray–Saint-Michel–Parc-Extension
- Postal Code: H2A
- Area codes: 514, 438

Little Maghreb (French: Petit Maghreb, pronounced [pəti maɡʁɛb]) is a neighbourhood in the borough of Villeray–Saint-Michel–Parc-Extension in Montreal. The neighbourhood is centered on fifteen blocks of Jean Talon Street stretching from Saint-Michel Boulevard in the West to Pie-IX Boulevard in the East. Maghrebi merchants in the area, mainly from Algeria, Morocco and Tunisia, have joined together to create a Little Maghreb identity for the neighbourhood, in the same way as Chinatown had become a symbol for Chinese Montrealers, and Little Italy had become the focal point of the city's Italian community.

Originally a part of the Saint-Michel neighbourhood, the late 1990s marked the beginning of the neighbourhood's Maghrebi flavour. This was a product of the opening of the Dar Al-Arkam Mosque on the corner of Jean-Talon and 17th Avenue and the arrival of thousands of immigrants from Algeria, Morocco, Libya, and Tunisia.

Little Maghreb is served by the Saint-Michel Metro station on the Blue Line, with the upcoming eastbound extension of the Blue Line also continuing under the district.
