= D'Iberville station =

Montreal Metro station

D'Iberville
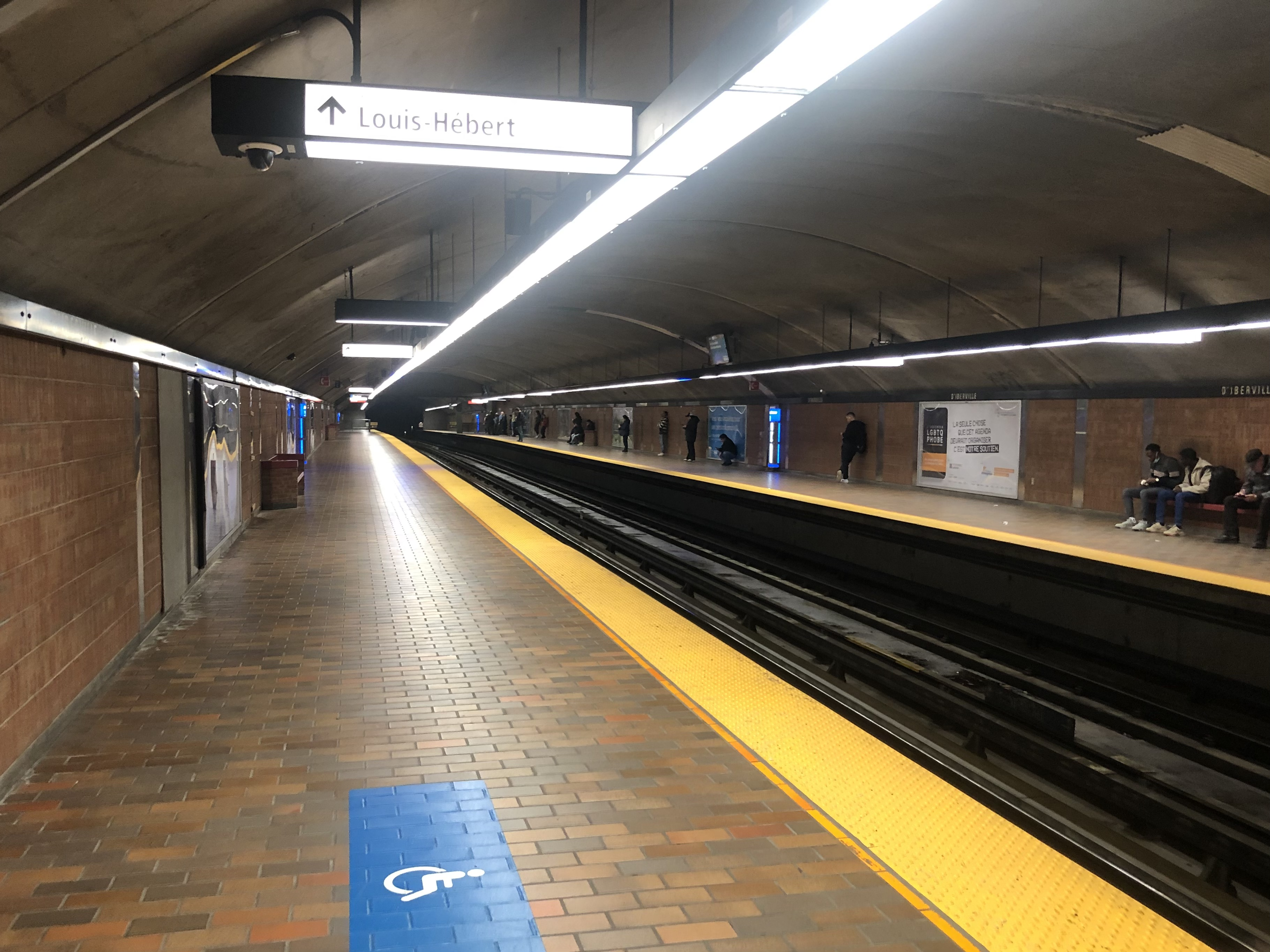

General information
- Location: 7151, rue d'Iberville and 2400, rue Jean-Talon Est; Montreal, Quebec H2E 1V9; Canada
- Coordinates: 45°33′13″N 73°36′07″W
- Operator: Société de transport de Montréal
- Platforms: 2 side platforms
- Tracks: 2
- Connections: STM bus

Construction
- Depth: 15.6 metres (51 feet 2 inches), 34th deepest
- Accessible: Yes
- Architect: Brassard & Warren

Other information
- Fare zone: ARTM: A

History
- Opened: 16 June 1986

Passengers
- 2024: 1,372,480 ▲16.6%
- Rank: 65 of 68

Services
| Preceding station | Montreal Metro | Following station |
|---|---|---|
| Fabre toward Snowdon | Blue Line | Saint-Michel Terminus |
Location

D'Iberville station (French pronunciation: [dibɛʁvil]) is a Montreal Metro station in Montreal, Quebec, Canada. It is operated by the Société de transport de Montréal (STM) and serves the Blue Line. It opened in 1986. It is located at the southwestern tip of the Saint-Michel neighborhood.

== Overview ==
It is a normal side platform station with two entrances, one of them automated. The station, clad in terra cotta, features one artwork, a large abstract aluminum mural by Eddy Tardif entitled Le Pélican, representing Pierre Le Moyne D'Iberville's ship.

== Origin of name ==
D'Iberville is named for the rue D'Iberville, in turn named in honour of Pierre Le Moyne d'Iberville.

== Station improvements ==
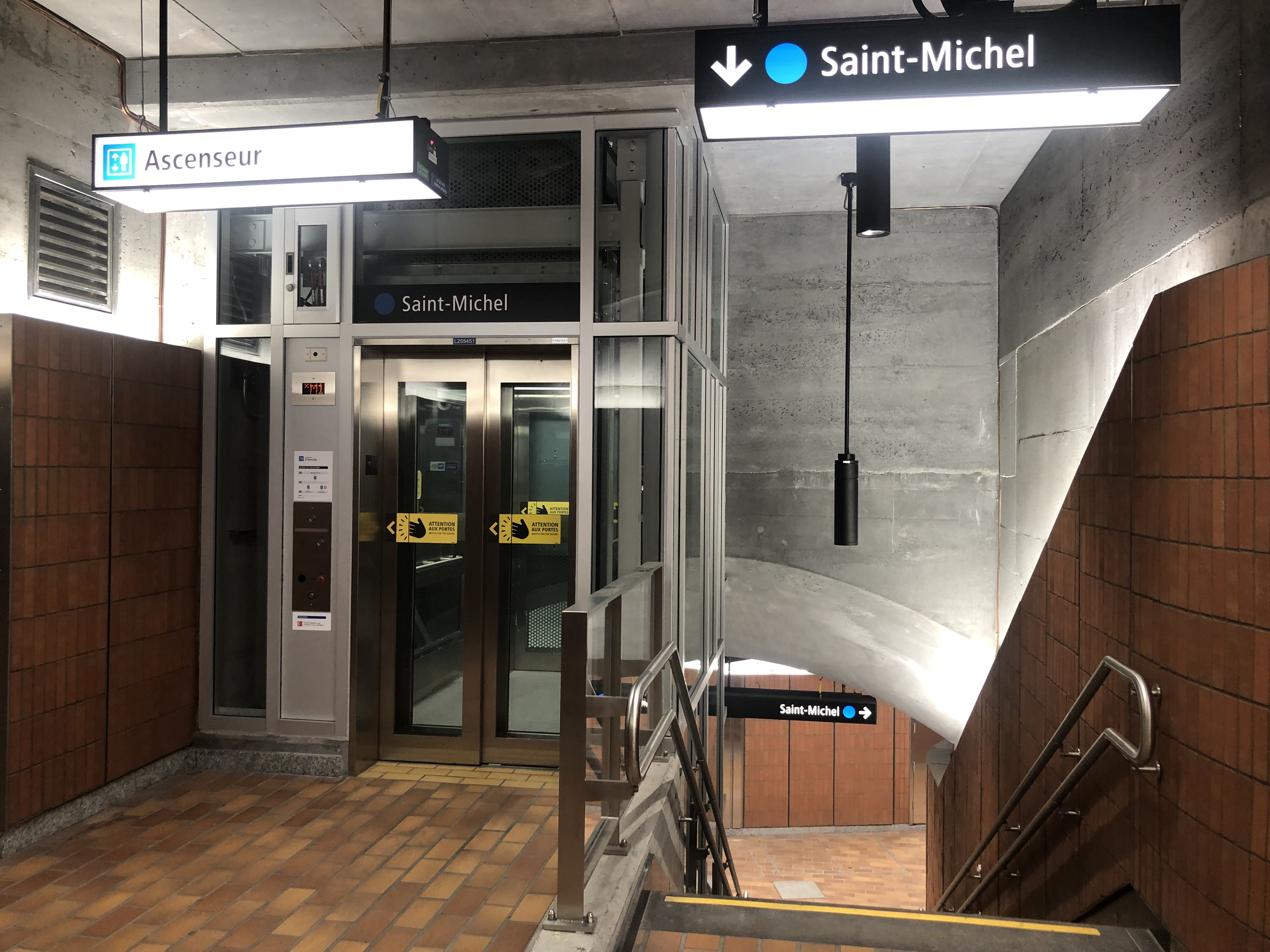
An elevator at the station, with a second stair access, to the Saint-Michel platform. The work is done on January 29, 2024.

In spring 2020, work began at the station to upgrade and refurbish it, as well as making it universally accessible at a cost of $38.5 million. Three elevators and a ventilation shaft will be installed, and the main entrance of the station will be renovated. Between October 2020 and January 2024, the main entrance building on rue d'Iberville was closed to allow construction work to take place, with passengers using the secondary entrance while the main entrance is closed.

On January 29, 2024, the station became the 27th accessible station on the Metro when the main entrance reopened.

== Connecting bus routes ==
Société de transport de Montréal
| No. | Route | Connects to | Service times / notes |
|---|---|---|---|
| 93 | Jean-Talon | Parc; De Castelnau; Jean-Talon; Fabre; Saint-Michel; Pie-IX BRT | Daily |
| 94 | D'Iberville | Frontenac | Daily |
| 372 ☾ | Jean-Talon | Saint-Michel; Fabre; Jean-Talon; De Castelnau; Parc; Acadie; Canora; Namur | Night service |

== Nearby points of interest ==
- St-Mathieu School
- St-Barthélémy School
- St-Barthélémy community center

== Film and television appearances ==
D'Iberville station appeared in the 2013 drama movie Sarah Prefers to Run (French: Sarah préfère la course), directed by Canadian film director Chloé Robichaud. The movie was also Robichaud's directing debut.
