= IGA Stadium =

Tennis stadium in Montreal

- Stade IGA (French)
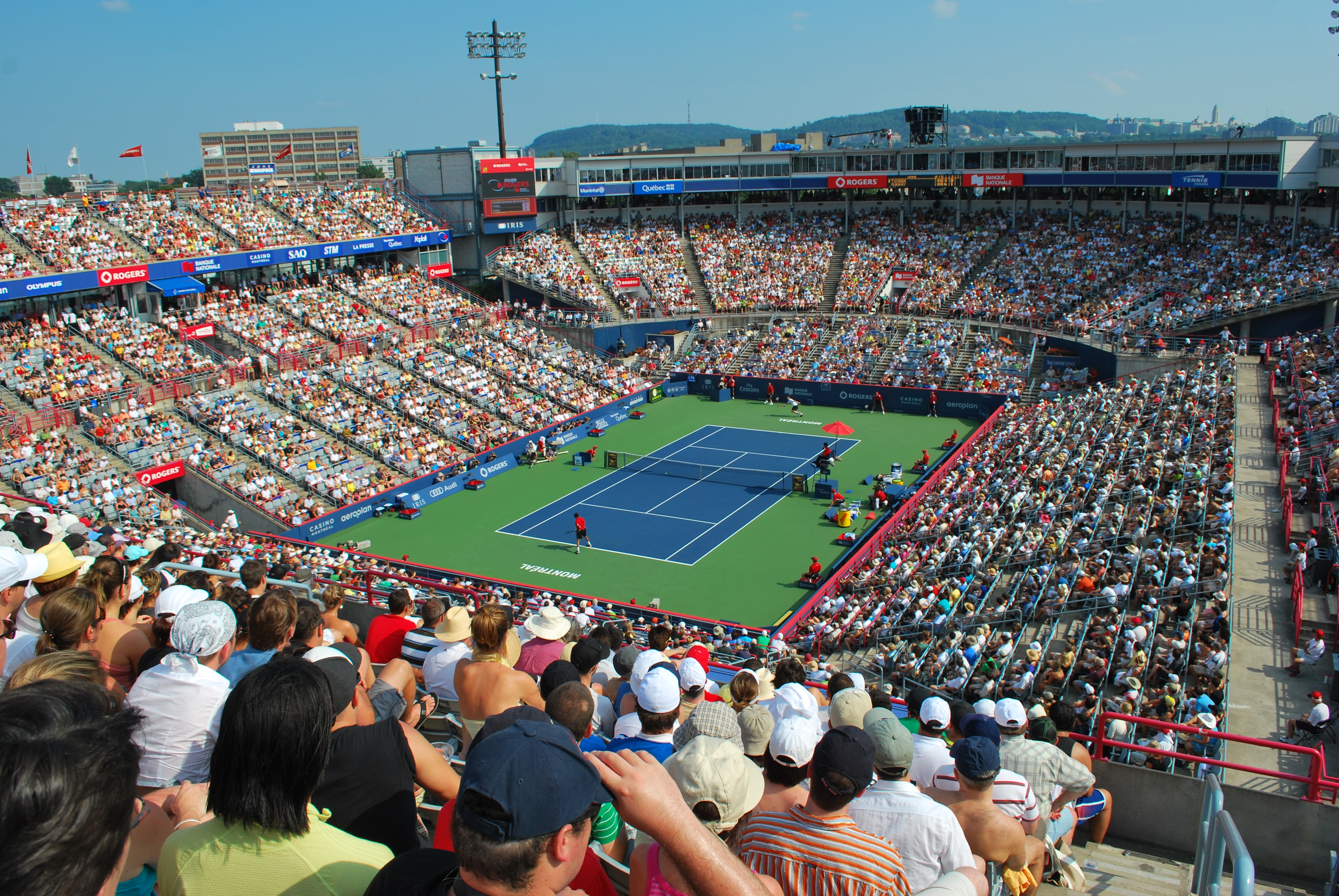

- Location within Montreal Location within Quebec Location within Canada
- Interactive map of IGA Stadium
- Former names: Du Maurier Stadium (1987-2003); Uniprix Stadium (2004-2018)
- Address: 285 Gary-Carter street Montreal, Quebec, Canada
- Coordinates: 45.53302°N 73.62755°W
- Owner: Tennis Canada
- Capacity: 11,815
- Surface: Hard, Outdoors
- Public transit: Parc (Metro), De Castelnau; Jarry; Parc

Construction
- Groundbreaking: August, 1995
- Opened: August, 1996

Tenants
- National Bank Open presented by Rogers (Men) (ATP 1000); 1996–present National Bank Open presented by Rogers (Women) (WTA 1000); 1996–present

Website
- stadeiga.com/en/

IGA Stadium (French: Stade IGA), originally called Du Maurier Stadium and formerly Uniprix Stadium, is the main tennis court at the Canadian Open tournament in Montreal, Quebec, Canada. Built in 1996 and completed the following year, the centre court stadium currently holds 11,815 spectators. The stadium grounds is located in Jarry Park within the borough of Villeray–Saint-Michel–Parc-Extension.

On Monday, April 16, 2018, Tennis Canada announced the stadium would have a naming rights contract with Empire Company, a Nova Scotia-based conglomerate that branded the stadium as Stade IGA, for their licensed grocer brand operated by their subsidiary Sobeys. Formerly, it was named after Du Maurier, a cigarette brand, then Uniprix, a pharmacy chain in Quebec.

The twelve courts at this venue use the DecoTurf cushioned acrylic surface, a surface previously used at the U.S. Open Tennis Championships. The Canadian Open is part of the US Open Series of events leading into the Grand Slam event. Uniquely, the Canadian Open is held in two cities, Montreal and Toronto, with the men and women alternating venues each year. Beginning 2021, IGA Stadium hosts the WTA in odd-numbered years and hosts the ATP in even-numbered years.

Its core seating area is a remnant of the former Major League Baseball stadium on the site, Jarry Park Stadium, the original home of the Montreal Expos (now Washington Nationals), with the main road being 285 Rue Gary Carter, named for the National Baseball Hall of Fame inductee whose career primarily was in the city.

On May 23, 2025, the Montreal Alliance hosted the Ottawa Blackjacks in a Canadian Elite Basketball League game outdoors at IGA Stadium. According to the league, it was "the first professional five-on-five basketball game held outdoors in Canadian history."

In June 2026, it was announced that a new stadium would be constructed in Jarry Park to keep up with new demands for tennis competitions, thus potentially bringing an end to the stadium.

== See also ==
- Jarry Park
- List of tennis stadiums by capacity
