= Blue Line (Montreal Metro) =

Subway line in Montreal, Quebec

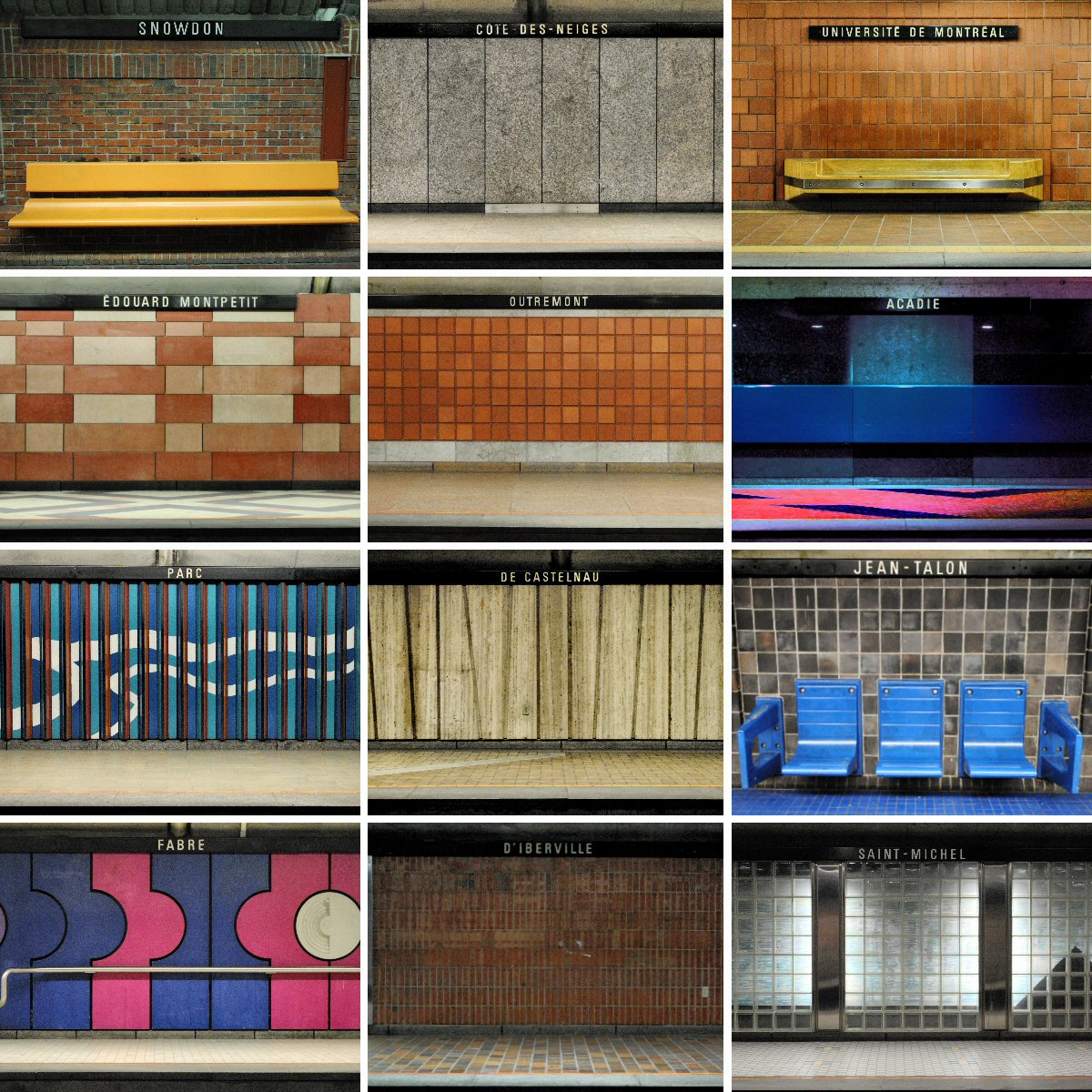

Overview
- Native name: Ligne bleue (French)
- Line number: 5
- Locale: Montreal, Quebec, Canada
- Termini: Snowdon (west); Saint-Michel (east)
- Stations: 12 (5 under construction)

Service
- Type: Rapid transit
- System: Montreal Metro
- Operator: Société de transport de Montréal (STM)
- Depot(s): Plateau d'Youville (connected to line 2, for MR-73 cars); Snowdon tail tracks and connecting track (connected to line 2, for maintenance of way equipment)
- Rolling stock: Bombardier Transportation MR-73 cars

History
- Opened: 16 June 1986; 40 years ago
- 15 June 1987: Opening of extension to Parc
- 4 January 1988: Opening of extension to Snowdon
- 28 March 1988: Opening of Acadie

Technical
- Line length: 9.7 km (6.0 mi)
- Track gauge: 1,435 mm (4 ft 8 1/2 in) standard gauge
- Electrification: Guide bar, 750 V DC
- Operating speed: 55–65 km/h (34–40 mph)
Route map
Blue Line highlighted in blue

The Blue Line (French: Ligne bleue, pronounced [liɲ blø]), also known as Line 5 (French: Ligne 5), is one of the four lines of the Montreal Metro in Montreal, Quebec, Canada. It was the fourth to be built, notwithstanding its alternate official name of "Line 5", as Line 3 was planned but never built. Unlike the other three routes, the east–west Blue Line does not serve the city's main Metro junction at Berri–UQAM.

The line first opened in 1986, with the last addition to the line being an intermediate station in 1988. The line is currently being extended five stations to the east, with completion scheduled for 2031.

== History ==
The Blue Line was first proposed in the early 1970s as an east–west line passing through the centre of the island of Montreal. Construction of Snowdon station began in 1975 as part of the construction of the Orange Line. In 1979, the provincial government confirmed plans to build the Blue Line.

On 16 June 1986, the first section opened, between Saint-Michel and De Castelnau. That was followed by the section from De Castelnau to Parc on 15 June 1987 and Parc to Snowdon on 4 January 1988. The opening of the intermediate station Acadie was delayed for almost three months and occurred on 28 March 1988.

Due to low usage, the line was initially operated from 5:30 am to 7:30 pm on weekdays, and used three-car trains instead of the nine-car trains used on the other Metro lines. Students from the University of Montreal, the main source of Blue Line riders, obtained an extension of the closing time to 11:10 pm and then 12:15 am in 2002. As of 2023, the line has similar opening hours to other metro lines.

In the 2010s, work began on making the line accessible to all, with the installation of elevators. As of January 2025, four stations on the line are accessible, including both interchange stations at Snowdon and Jean-Talon. In the 2020s, the renovation of Édouard-Montpetit station included linking the station to the new Réseau express métropolitain, which replaced the Deux-Montagnes line with rapid transit.

In January 2023, the Société de transport de Montréal announced that the line would be re-signalled with communications-based train control (CBTC) as part of the work to extend the line eastwards to Anjou. In February 2024, a $217-million contract was awarded to Thales to install CBTC on the line.

=== Extensions ===
Initial proposals for the line in the 1970s suggested that the line would run from Ville Saint-Pierre, Lachine, in the west, passing through the centre of the island of Montreal before turning north towards Montréal-Nord.

==== Eastern extension to Anjou ====
Following the opening of the line in the 1980s, various governments have proposed extending the line east to Anjou, such as prior to the provincial elections of 1989. Various studies took place to understand the cost and ridership potential of an extension.

The former Agence métropolitaine de transport (AMT, now ARTM) published a study, Vision 2020, in December 2011. The study proposed extending the Blue Line northeast of Saint-Michel to Anjou. There were a total of five planned new stations: Pie-IX, Viau, Lacordaire, Langelier and Anjou. The terminus would be located at the Galeries d'Anjou shopping centre, near the junction of Autoroute 25 and Autoroute 40.

On 20 September 2013, a 7-kilometre (4.3 mi) extension northeast to St. Leonard and Anjou was announced by the STM and the Quebec government. The provincial government announced that the extension would proceed and committed $38.8 million to set up a project office tasked with preparing detailed financial and technical plans within two years. The start of construction was slated for 2021, with completion in 2025.

After the Parti Québécois lost the 2014 provincial election, the future of the Blue Line extension came into question. The successor Liberal government had expressed interest in extending mass transit to Montréal–Trudeau International Airport and implementing a light rail line on the new Champlain Bridge under construction. On 28 May 2014, it was announced that the project would be reviewed by the new provincial government and that, if the project was again approved, construction would start in 2021, which was confirmed in the STM's new 2025 Plan. The project could cost up to $3 billion based on a February 2016 reassessment.

On 9 April 2018, premier of Quebec Philippe Couillard and Prime Minister Justin Trudeau announced their commitment to fund and complete the extension, then planned to open in 2026. Around $365 million was provided to STM to allow them to purchase land and undertake design and technical work.

In March 2022, it was announced that the federal government had agreed to provide $1.3 billion to the extension, with further costs to be covered by the provincial government. In March 2025, the federal government committed an additional $650 million to the project. The 6-kilometre (3.7 mi) extension was set to include five new stations, two bus terminals, a pedestrian tunnel connecting to the Pie-IX BRT and a new park-and-ride. Overall, the project was estimated to cost around $5.8 to $6.4 billion and scheduled to be completed in 2029.

Initial construction work began in August 2022. Procurement work to build the tunnels and stations began in the fourth quarter of 2022. In January 2023, the STM announced that five Quebec artists – Jocelyne Alloucherie, Ludovic Boney, Nadia Myre, Alain Paiement and Marc Séguin – had been selected to create public art at each of the new stations. In September 2023, construction tenders for the tunnel boring machine were called and an announcement was made that the opening date would be delayed to 2031. In February 2024, Thales was awarded a CA$217 million contract to install communications-based train control on the Blue Line, including on the new extension. In August 2024, a consortium led by Pomerleau was awarded a CA$1.1 billion contract to dig the tunnel and construct 3 stations. It was also announced that the extension would now cost CA$7.6 billion to construct. It was estimated that around 69,000 daily passengers would use the extension.

Construction officially started in September 2024. In March 2025, the federal government announced that it would contribute a further CA$650 million towards the extension. In September 2025, Mayor of Montreal Valérie Plante announced the names of the five new stations, with several stations named after women. In October 2025, a tunnel boring machine that would dig the extension arrived from Germany. Digging, advancing at a rate of ten metres per day began in April 2026. The tunnel boring machine name was revealed in May 2026 as "Lisette" in honor of the first female metro operator of the STM, following a public vote.

==== Proposed western extension ====
The original intent for the Blue Line was that it would extend southwest from Snowdon to serve Notre-Dame-de-Grâce, Hampstead, Montreal West and Ville Saint-Pierre. Snowdon station was constructed with a cross-platform interchange to allow easy access to Orange line trains heading downtown.

== Service ==
=== Operation hours and frequency ===
The Blue Line operates between 5:30 a.m. and 12:45 a.m on weekdays and Sunday, and between 5:30 a.m. and 1:15 a.m on Saturday. Trains arrive at stations every 3 to 5 minutes during peak periods, every 5 to 10 minutes during off peak periods, and every 8 to 11 minutes on weekends.

=== Rolling stock ===
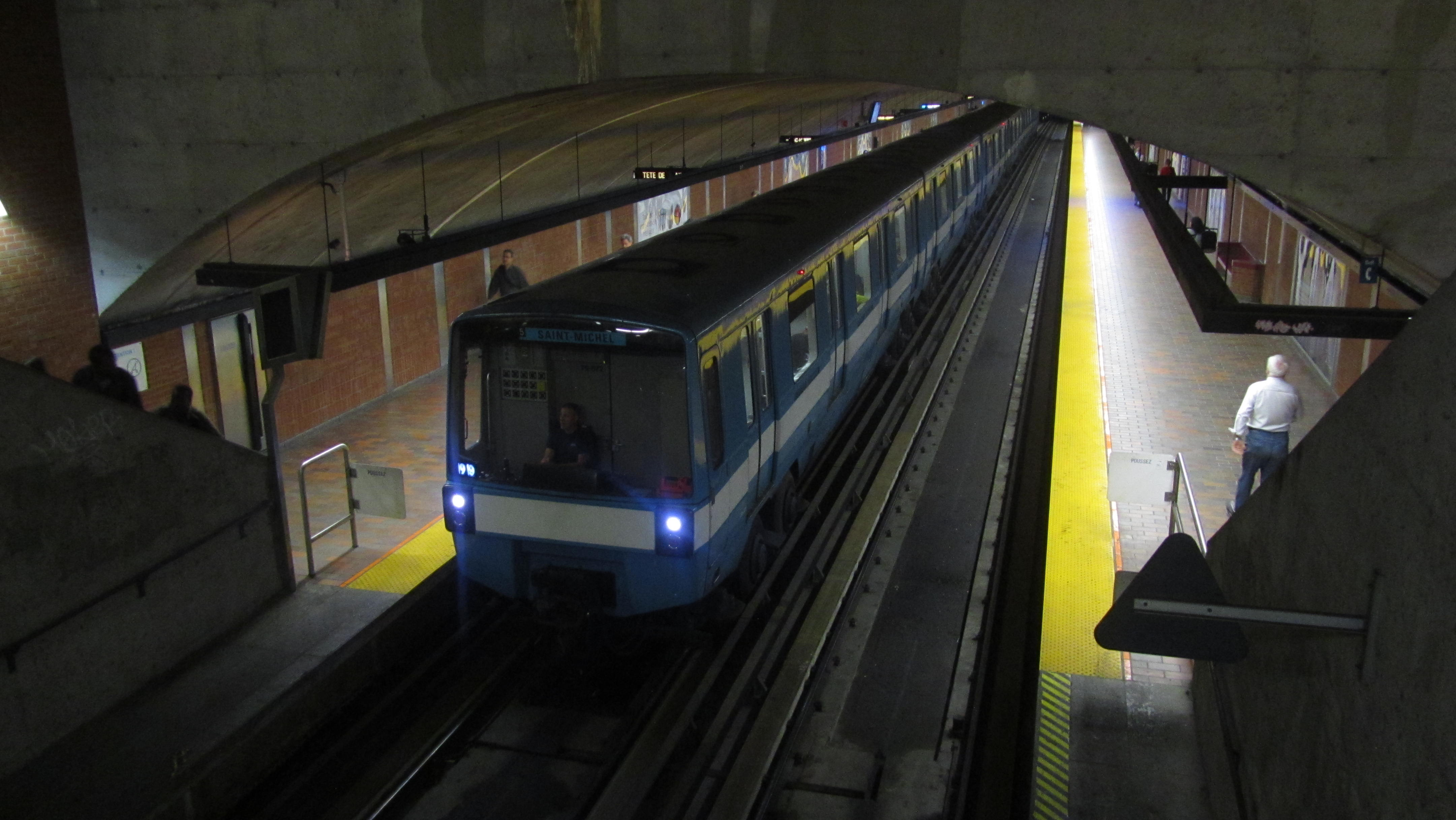
An MR-73 train at D'Iberville station

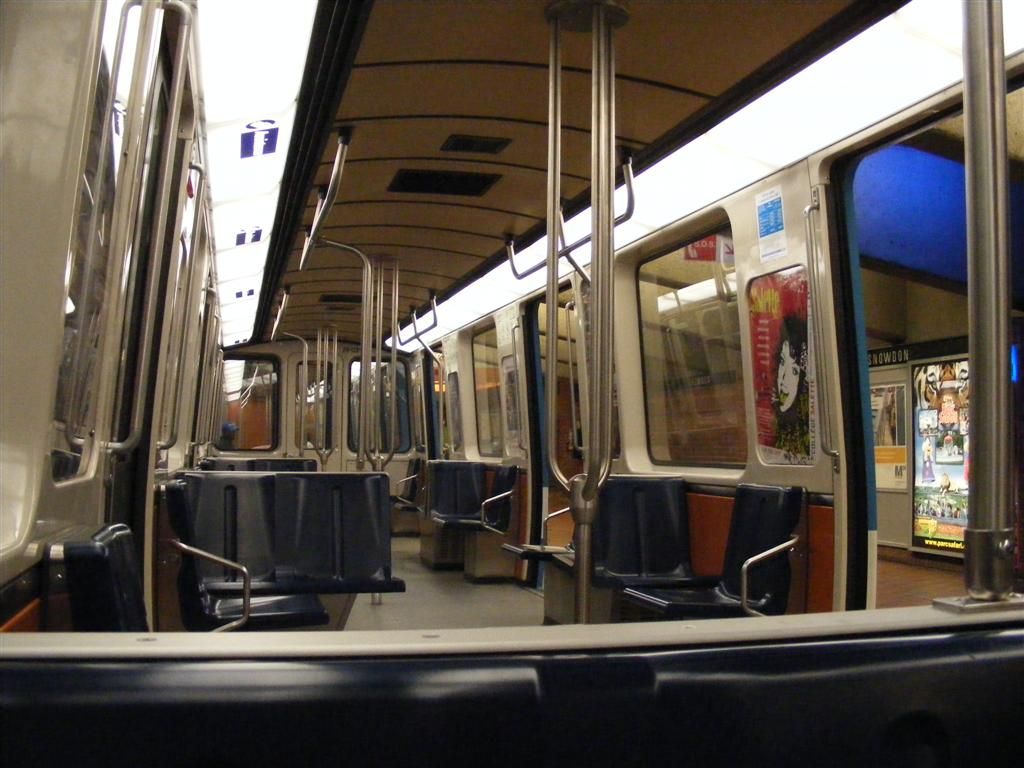
The interior of a MR-73

Since the line's opening, Blue Line trains have been made up of MR-73 cars. Each train consists of two units of three cars, totalling six cars, shorter than the Green, Orange, and Yellow Line trains, which all comprise three units of three cars, for a total of nine cars. Some nine-car MR-73 trains were transferred from the Orange to the Blue Line, but these had to be shortened to six-car configurations.

The preceding MR-63 model spent its final day in revenue service on the Blue Line, on 21 June 2018, but otherwise, never appeared on it.

The line is served by Youville Shops, located between Parc and de Castelnau stations. This is located underground and occupies a small portion underneath Jarry Park. Another service facility is located at the 500-metre (1,600 ft) end tracks following Snowdon station but is rarely used by the STM.

== List of stations ==
Station	Inauguration date	Odonym	Namesake	Transfers/Connections	Location
Snowdon	4 January 1988	Snowdon Street; Snowdon neighbourhood	Name of area's former landowner	Orange Line	Côte-des-Neiges– Notre-Dame- de Grâce
Côte-des-Neiges	4 January 1988	Côte-des-Neiges Road	Former Village of Côte-des-Neiges (name Notre-Dame-des-Neiges (Our Lady of the Snow) dates to 18th century)		Côte-des-Neiges– Notre-Dame- de Grâce
Université-de-Montréal	4 January 1988	Université de Montréal			Côte-des-Neiges– Notre-Dame- de Grâce
Édouard-Montpetit	4 January 1988	Édouard-Montpetit Boulevard	Édouard Montpetit, Université de Montréal professor	Réseau express métropolitain	Côte-des-Neiges– Notre-Dame- de Grâce
Outremont	4 January 1988	Outremont Avenue; borough of Outremont	Named for a prominent estate (Outremont means "other side of the mountain")		Outremont
Acadie	28 March 1988	Boulevard de l'Acadie	Commemorates bicentennial of the expulsion of the Acadians		Villeray– Saint-Michel– Parc-Extension
Parc	15 June 1987	Park Avenue	Mont Royal Park	At Parc station: Saint-Jérôme line	Villeray– Saint-Michel– Parc-Extension
De Castelnau	16 June 1986	De Castelnau Street	Édouard de Castelnau, French soldier		Villeray– Saint-Michel– Parc-Extension
Jean-Talon	16 June 1986	Jean Talon Street	Jean Talon, intendant of New France	Orange Line	Villeray– Saint-Michel– Parc-Extension
Fabre	16 June 1986	Fabre Street	Édouard-Charles Fabre, first Roman Catholic Archbishop of Montreal		Villeray– Saint-Michel– Parc-Extension
D'Iberville	16 June 1986	D'Iberville Street	Pierre Le Moyne d'Iberville (French explorer, founder of Louisiana)		Villeray– Saint-Michel– Parc-Extension
Saint-Michel	16 June 1986	Saint-Michel Boulevard; neighbourhood of Saint-Michel (formerly Ville Saint-Michel)	Saint-Michel; long-standing name		Villeray– Saint-Michel– Parc-Extension
Vertières (future)	2031 (projected)	Significant battle in Haiti; honours Haitian population in the area	Battle of Vertières	Pie-IX BRT	
Mary-Two-Axe-Earley (future)	2031 (projected)		Mary Two-Axe Earley, Mohawk and Oneida women's rights activist		Saint-Léonard
Cesira-Parisotto (future)	2031 (projected)	Honours Italian population in the area	Césira Parisotto, Italian-Canadian nun known for her charitable works		Saint-Léonard
Madeleine-Parent (future)	2031 (projected)		Madeleine Parent, labour, women's and aboriginal rights activist		Saint-Léonard
Anjou (future)	2031 (projected)	Borough of Anjou			Anjou

== See also ==
- Green Line
- Orange Line
- Yellow Line
- Red Line (Line 3)
- List of Montreal Metro stations
