= Saint Michel Boulevard =

Saint Michel Boulevard may refer to

- Boulevard Saint-Michel, in Paris
- Saint-Michel Boulevard (Montreal)
