= Villeray–Saint-Michel–Parc-Extension =

Coordinates: 45°32′57″N 73°36′49″W

- Borough of Montreal
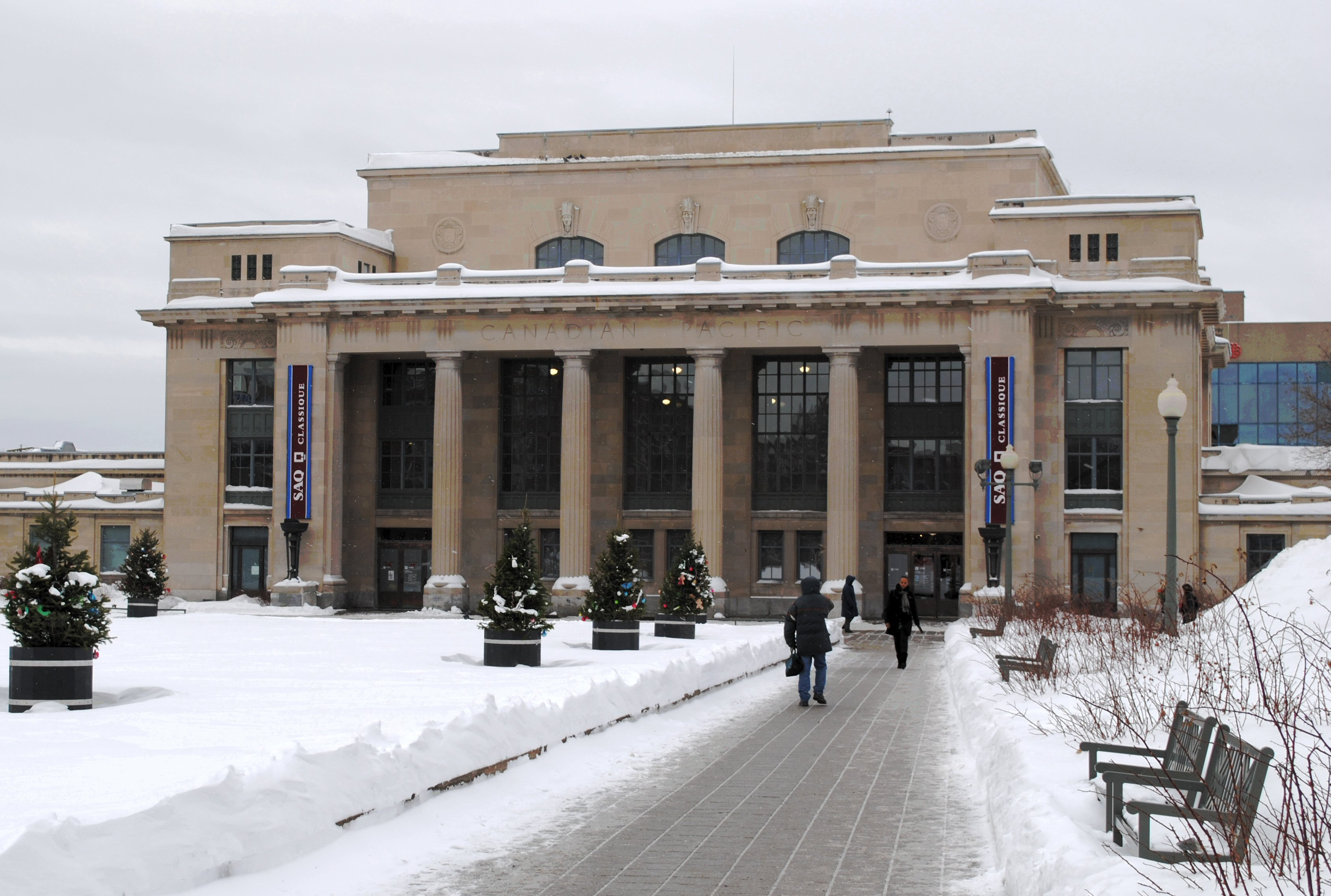
- Former Park Avenue train station (Gare Jean-Talon)

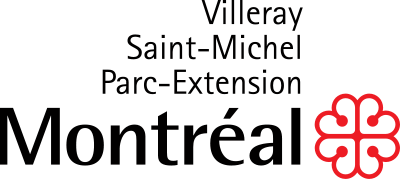

- Location of Villeray–Saint-Michel–Parc-Extension on the Island of Montreal. (Grey areas indicate demerged municipalities).
- Country: Canada
- Province: Quebec
- Region: Montréal
- Established: January 1, 2002
- Electoral Districts Federal: Papineau; Saint-Léonard—Saint-Michel
- Provincial: Laurier-Dorion; Viau

Government
  - Type: Borough
  - Mayor: Laurence Lavigne Lalonde (Projet Montréal)
  - Federal MP(s): Marjorie Michel (LIB); Patricia Lattanzio (LIB)
  - Quebec MNA(s): Andrés Fontecilla (QS); Frantz Benjamin (PLQ)

Area
  - Total: 16.5 km^{2} (6.4 sq mi)

Population (2021)
  - Total: 145,090
  - Density: 8,793.3/km^{2} (22,775/sq mi)
  - Dwellings: 64,900
- Time zone: UTC-5 (EST)
  - Summer (DST): UTC-4 (EDT)
- Postal code(s): H3N, H2P, H2R, H1Z
- Area codes: (514) and (438)
- Access Routes A-19 A-40: R-125
- Website: Official website

Villeray–Saint-Michel–Parc-Extension (French pronunciation: [vilʁɛ sɛ̃ miʃɛl paʁk ɛkstɑ̃sjɔ̃]) is a borough (arrondissement) in the city of Montreal, Quebec. It had a population of 145,090 according to the 2021 Census and a land area of 16.5 square kilometres (6.4 mi^{2}).

The borough of Villeray–Saint-Michel–Parc-Extension was created on January 1, 2002, following the municipal reorganization of Montreal. The borough includes the neighbourhoods of Villeray, Saint-Michel, and Parc-Extension.

== History ==
Until the late Nineteenth century, the area that today comprises the borough of Villeray–Saint-Michel–Parc-Extension was predominantly rural and dotted with farms. The inauguration of the Canadian Pacific Railway in 1878 and the arrival of electric streetcars in 1892 permitted the growth of Villeray. It was also in this era that the Italian immigrant community chose the neighbourhood as their preferred location.

In the early Twentieth century, Park Extension became industrialized, and a dozen quarries opened which led to the economic development of the area. Beginning in the 1940s, the exploitation of the Miron and Francon quarries attracted workers to Saint Michel and Park Extension.

Construction of the Metropolitan Expressway was completed in 1959. It cut the area in two, but also attracted multiple industries, which opened along the expressway. In less than twenty years, the population of Saint Michel increased from 6,000 to 68,000 inhabitants.

Jobs derived from competing industries along with the efficient transportation infrastructure resulted in strong demographic growth. The growth of the manufacturing sector, notably the textile industry, were incentives for new immigrants to settle in the borough.

The borough of Villeray–Saint-Michel–Parc-Extension was created on January 1, 2002, following the municipal reorganization of Montreal. The borough includes three neighbourhoods that were part of Montreal before the reorganization: Villeray, Saint-Michel, and Park Extension. The Saint-Michel neighbourhood was formerly an independent city known as Saint-Michel-de-Laval which was annexed to Montreal in 1968. Villeray was once also an autonomous municipality but has been part of the city of Montreal since 1905. Parc Extension left the parish of St-Laurent to join the city of Montreal in 1910.

== Geography ==
Located in north central Montreal, the pipe-shaped borough is bordered by Ahuntsic-Cartierville to the northwest, Montreal North to the northeast, Saint Leonard to the east, Rosemont—La Petite-Patrie to the southeast, Outremont to the southwest, and Mount Royal to the west.

Saint-Michel is the easternmost neighbourhood of the borough, Park Extension is the westernmost neighbourhood and Villeray is in the centre.

== Government ==
=== Municipal ===
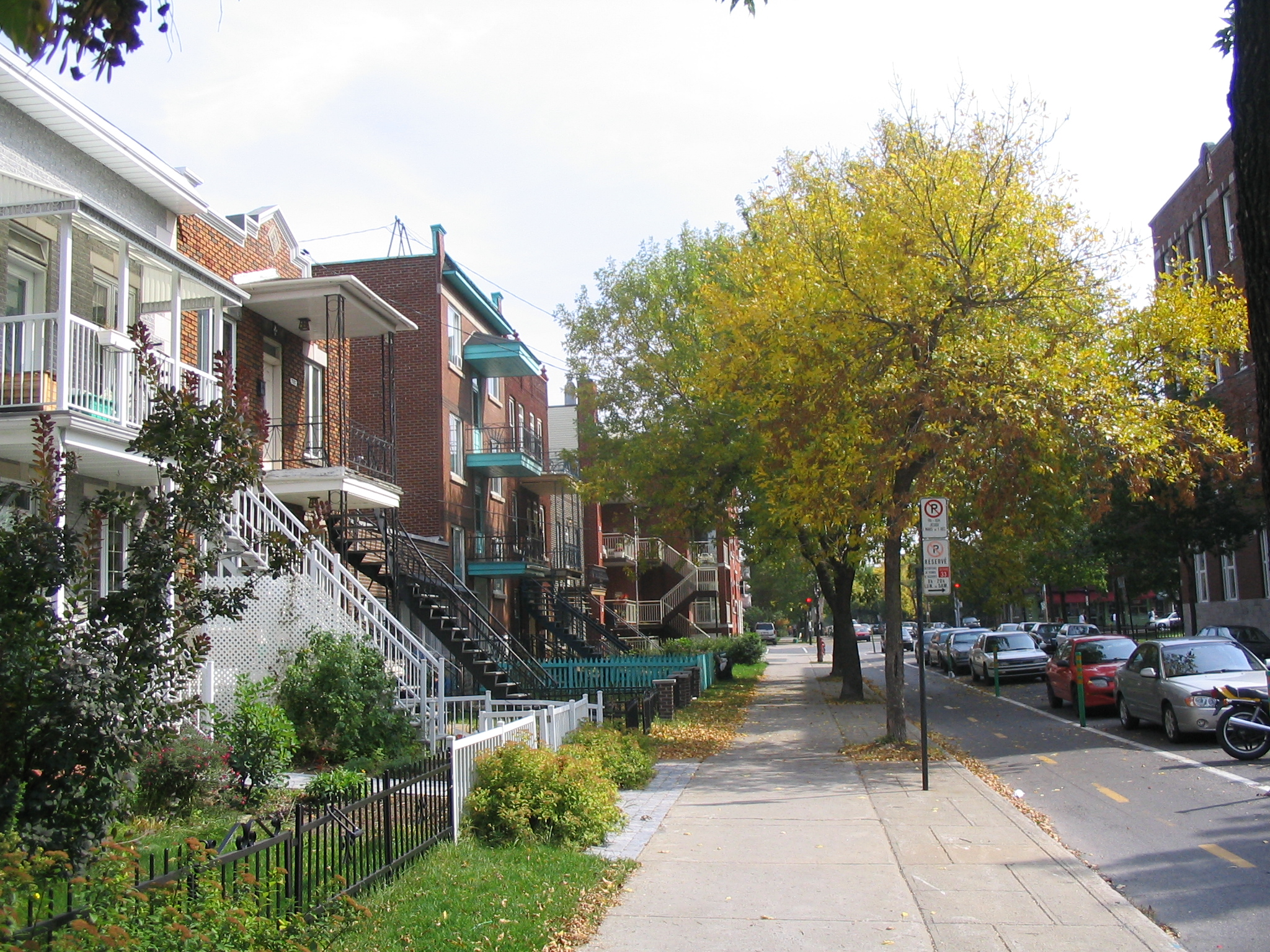
A bicycle path on Boyer Street.

The current borough mayor is Laurence Lavigne Lalonde of Projet Montréal.

The borough is divided into four districts located in three different neighborhoods. The districts bear the same name as their respective neighborhood with the exception of François-Perreault which is part of the Saint-Michel and Villeray neighborhoods.

- Saint-Michel
- François-Perreault
- Park Extension
- Villeray

==== Borough council ====
2017 Montreal Municipal Elections
District	Position	Name	Party
—	Borough mayor City councillor	Giuliana Fumagalli	Quartiers Montréal
François-Perrault	City councillor	Sylvain Ouellet	Projet Montréal
Parc-Extension	City councillor	Mary Deros	Ensemble Montréal
Saint-Michel	City councillor	Josué Corvil	Ensemble Montréal
Villeray	City councillor	Rosannie Filato	Projet Montréal

2021 Montreal Municipal Elections
District	Position	Name	Party
—	Borough mayor City councillor	Laurence Lavigne Lalonde	Projet Montréal
François-Perrault	City councillor	Sylvain Ouellet	Projet Montréal
Parc-Extension	City councillor	Mary Deros	Ensemble Montréal
Saint-Michel	City councillor	Josué Corvil	Ensemble Montréal
Villeray	City councillor	Martine Musau Muelle	Projet Montréal

=== Federal and provincial ===
The borough is divided among the following federal ridings:

- Papineau
- Saint-Léonard—Saint-Michel

It is divided among the following provincial electoral districts:

- Laurier-Dorion
- Viau

== Demographics ==
Source: ^{,}

Historical populations
Year	Pop.	±%
1966	201,296	—
1971	195,480	−2.9%
1976	176,583	−9.7%
1981	158,437	−10.3%
1986	149,496	−5.6%
1991	143,540	−4.0%
1996	141,663	−1.3%
2001	145,485	+2.7%
2006	142,825	−1.8%
2011	142,222	−0.4%
2016	143,853	+1.1%
2021	145,090	+0.9%

Home language (2016)
Language	Population	Percentage (%)
French	71,815	57%
English	12,545	10%
Other languages	41,290	33%

The 2016 census found that 88% of the population only spoke one language at home. The five most common of these languages were French (57%), English (10%), Spanish (5.9%), Arabic (3.25%) and Vietnamese (2.9%).

Mother Tongue (2016)
Language	Population	Percentage (%)
French	62,900	46%
English	8,025	6%
Other languages	64,540	48%

According to 2016 census, 48% of residents grew up learning a language other than French and English. Of these other languages, the most common are Spanish (8.5%), Arabic (6.35%), Creole languages (4.23%), Italian (4.1%) and Greek (3.25%).

Visible Minorities (2016)
Ethnicity	Population	Percentage (%)
Not a visible minority	76,025	53.3%
Visible minorities	66,660	46.7%

== Features ==
It is served by the Orange and Blue lines of the Montreal Metro. It is traversed and partly delimited by Autoroute 40 (Metropolitan Aut.) and Autoroute 19 (Papineau Ave.)

== Transit stations ==
- Crémazie
- Jarry
- Jean-Talon
- Acadie
- Parc metro and train station
- De Castelnau
- Fabre
- D’Iberville
- Saint-Michel

A future unnamed station on the Blue Line of the Montreal Metro will be built in the borough transferring with the Pie-IX BRT.

== Attractions ==
Attractions in the area include the old Park Avenue train station (now containing Parc Metro station and near the Parc commuter train station), Jarry Park, and TOHU, La Cité des arts du cirque (including the Cirque du Soleil and the École nationale du cirque). The former Miron and Francon quarries are also located here.

The former studios of CTV Montreal, TQS, CFCF radio & CFQR-FM (now CKBE-FM) were located in the Parc Extension section of the borough. Today, the borough hall is at the former studios of those stations on 405 Ogilvy Avenue.

== Education ==
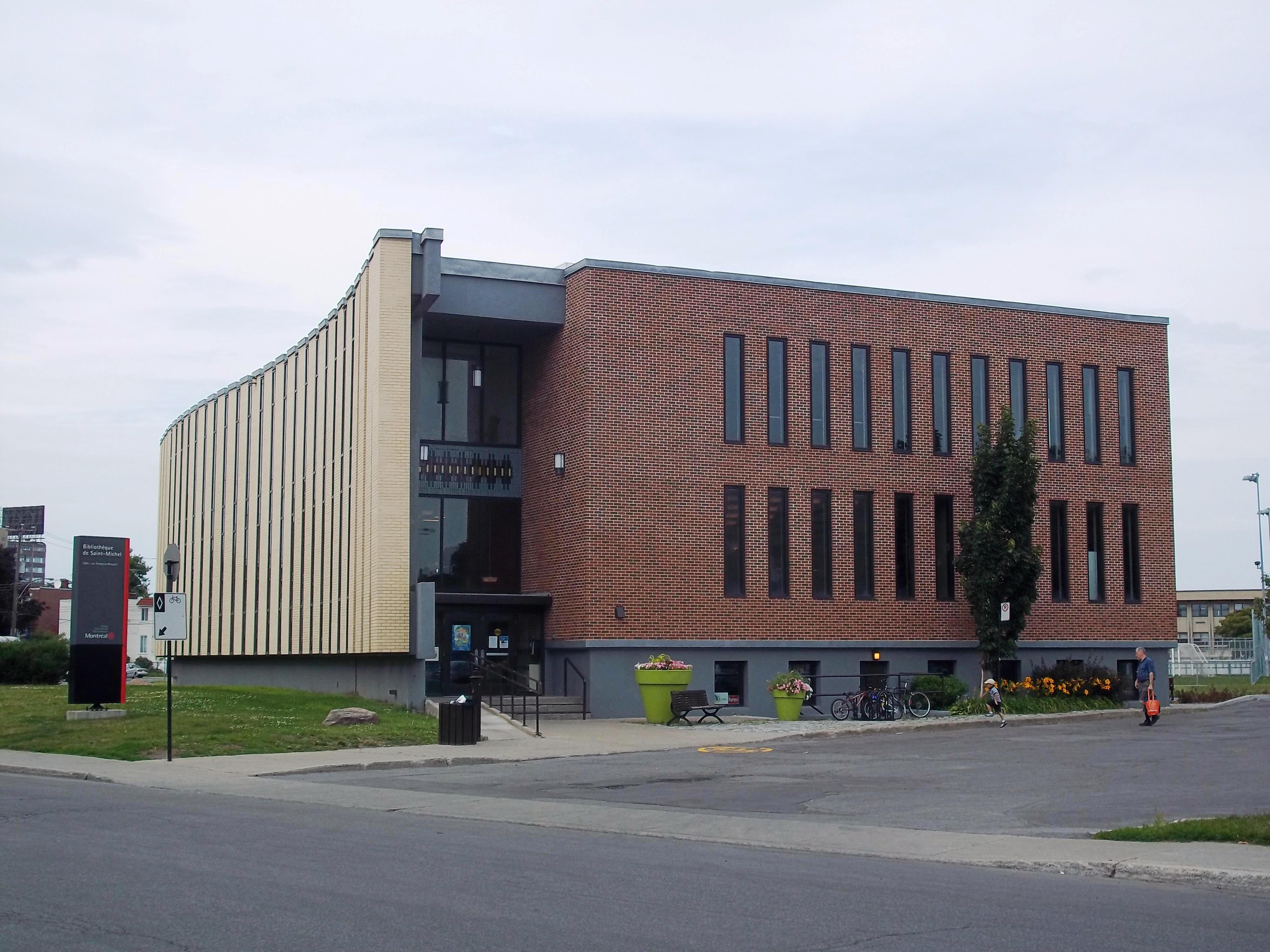
Saint-Michel library

The Commission scolaire de Montréal (CSDM) operates French-language public schools.

The English Montreal School Board (EMSB) operates English-language schools.

The Montreal Public Libraries Network operates the Le Prévost, Parc-Extension, and Saint-Michel libraries.

== See also ==
- Boroughs of Montreal
- Districts of Montreal
- Municipal reorganization in Quebec
- Stade Jarry
- Parc Jarry
- Park Extension
