= Parc station (Montreal) =

Montreal Metro and railway station

Park Avenue station
- Gare Jean-Talon
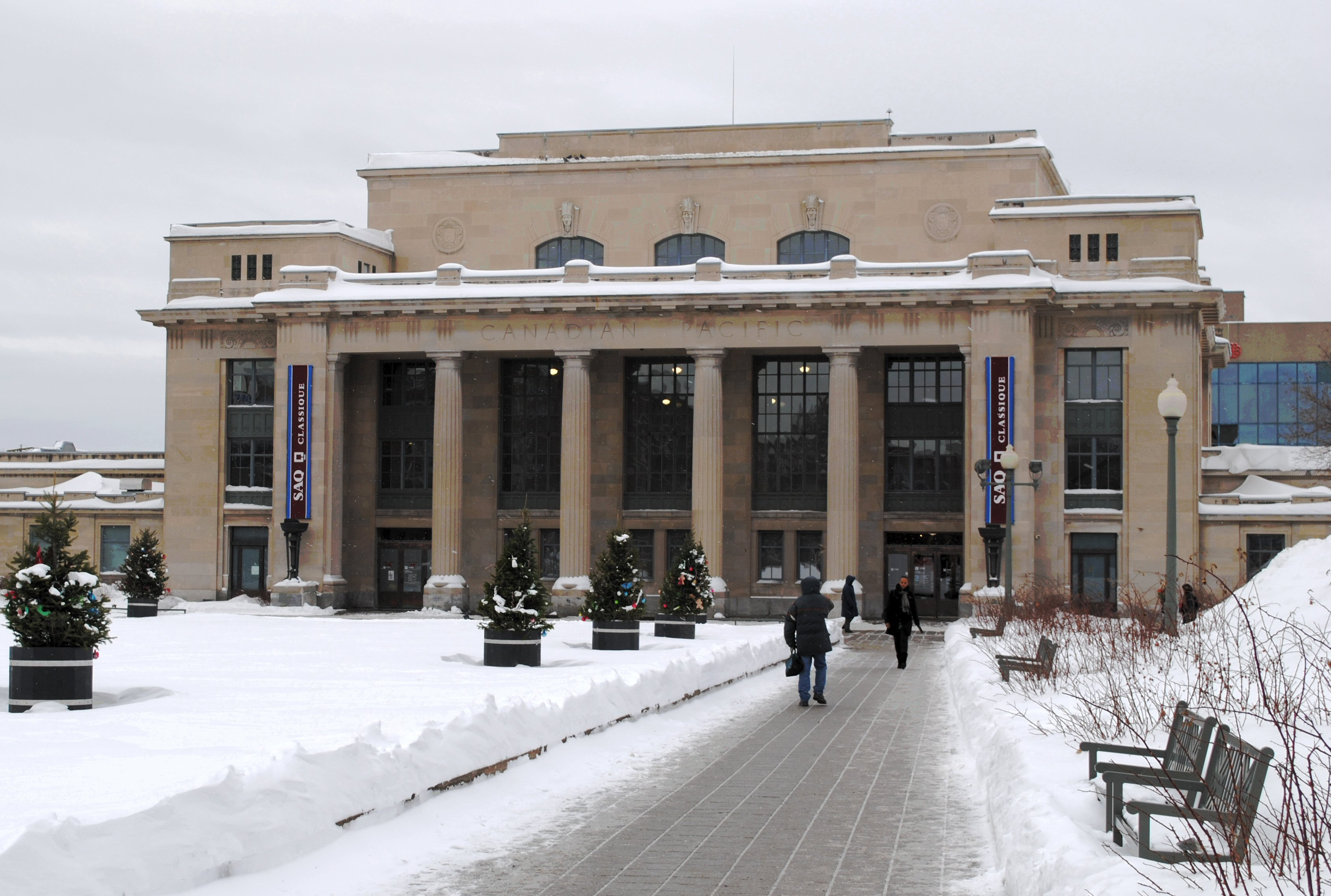
- Interactive map of the Park Avenue station area

General information
- Type: Metro station, Retail, and former railway station
- Architectural style: Art Deco
- Location: Montreal, Quebec, Canada, 395 Jean Talon Street West
- Coordinates: 45.5305°N 73.6237°W
- Current tenants: Joe Fresh
- Inaugurated: 1931

Design and construction
- Architect: Colin Drewitt

Parc station (French pronunciation: [paʁk]), also known as Park Avenue station and formerly Jean-Talon station ([ʒɑ̃ talɔ̃]), is a historic railway station building in Montreal, Quebec, Canada. Its western end houses the Montreal Metro's Parc station, while businesses occupy the rest of the building. Although the main building no longer serves the railway, the Exo commuter rail Parc station is adjacent to it. It is located on Jean-Talon Street at the end of Park Avenue in the Park Extension neighbourhood of the borough of Villeray–Saint-Michel–Parc-Extension.

The station was built by the Canadian Pacific Railway in 1931. Its traffic declined in the 1950s and it closed in 1984 when Via Rail transferred service to lines headed into Montreal Central Station. The City of Montreal purchased the building and the western end was converted as a metro station and the remainder of the building was adapted for business use. As of 2025, it houses a Joe Fresh outlet.

== History ==
The Canadian Pacific Railway built the Park Avenue station, which was designed by architect Colin Drewitt and opened in 1931. It was inaugurated in the presence of Camillien Houde, the mayor of Montreal at the time. Park Avenue station replaced the Mile End railway station, which was located near the corner of Saint Laurent Boulevard and Bernard Street.

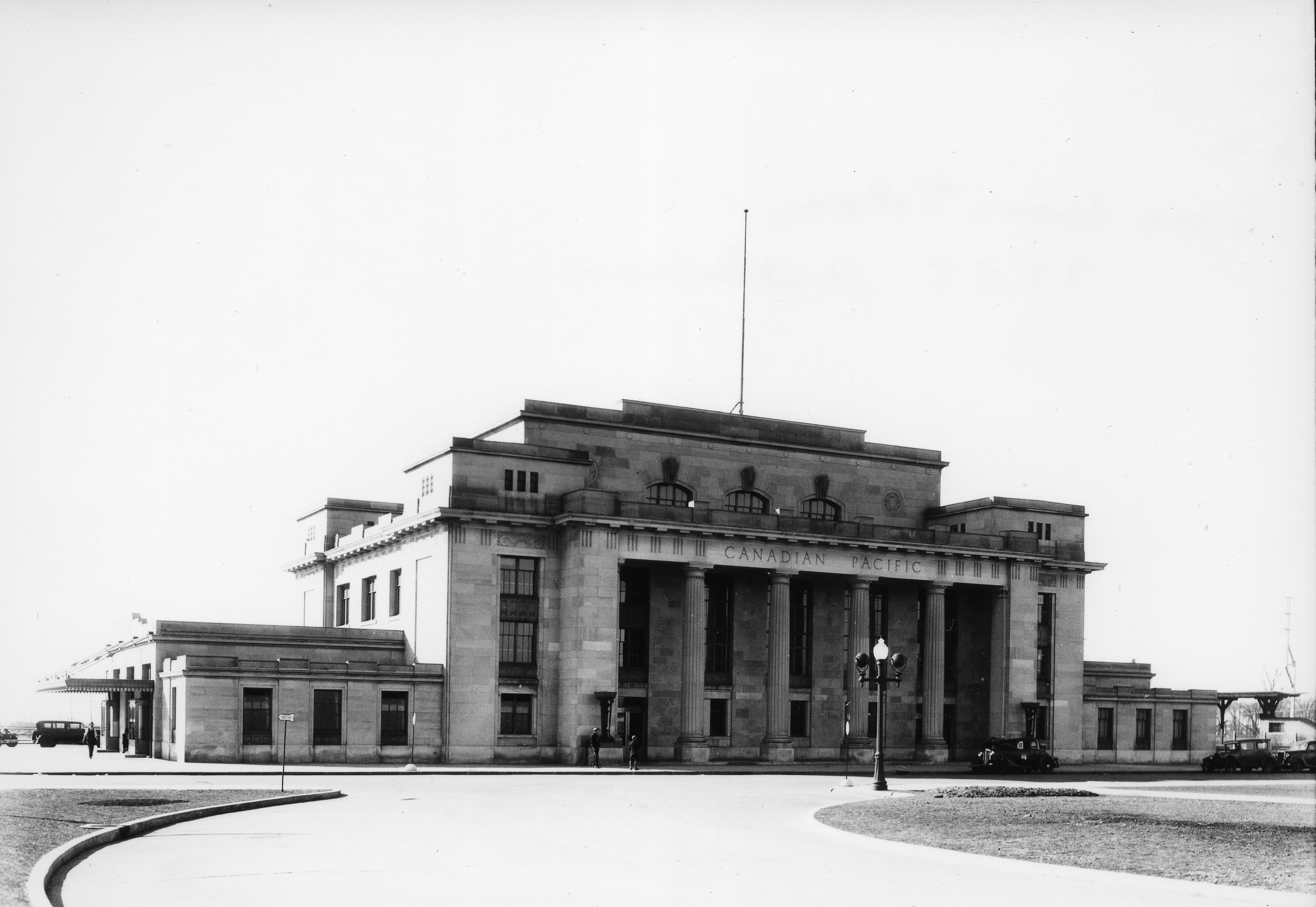
The station as it was in 1936.

In its time, all CPR trains headed toward Quebec City, Ottawa and the Laurentians, including Le Petit Train du Nord, travelled through Park Avenue Station.

The station's role as an important railway stop permitted the station to host many important figures. One such event occurred in 1939, when the station was the site of a royal visit by King George VI and his wife Queen Elizabeth, who were accompanied by Prime Minister William Lyon Mackenzie King.

Park Avenue station was an important stop for railway passengers until the early 1950s. Following the closure of Place Viger in 1951, Park Avenue station suffered a swift decline in traffic. It was closed itself in 1984 when Via Rail Canada transferred the southern terminal of the Montreal-Quebec City (Sainte-Foy) via Trois-Rivières train service from Windsor Station to Montreal Central Station. The same year, the city of Montreal acquired the building and ceded part of the building to the Montreal Urban Community for the construction underground of the Montreal Metro's Parc station, which opened in 1987. In 1997, Exo's commuter rail station opened, using the name Jean-Talon; but this was later changed in 2000 to Parc in order to avoid confusion with the Jean-Talon Metro station.

The central portion of the building became an Indigo Books and Music store, which closed and was replaced by a Société des alcools du Québec store, which itself closed in 2010. In 2006, a Loblaws store was added to the north of the building, to form a wing with an underground passage directly from the metro as well as one housing one of the first underground parking to be built underneath a grocery store in Quebec. The store was rebranded first as a Provigo in 2014, then as a Maxi & Cie in 2022.

Preceding station	Canadian Pacific Railway	Following station
Montreal West toward Montreal Windsor	Montreal – Quebec	Bordeaux toward Quebec
Bordeaux toward Mont-Laurier	Montreal – Mont-Laurier	Montreal Place Viger Terminus
Bordeaux toward Ottawa	Ottawa – Montreal via Montebello	Montreal Place Viger Terminus

== Current use ==
As of 2025, the central portion of the building houses a Value Village. The Montreal Metro's Parc station occupies the western end of the building. Adjacent is the separate Parc commuter rail station.

== Montreal Metro station ==
Parc
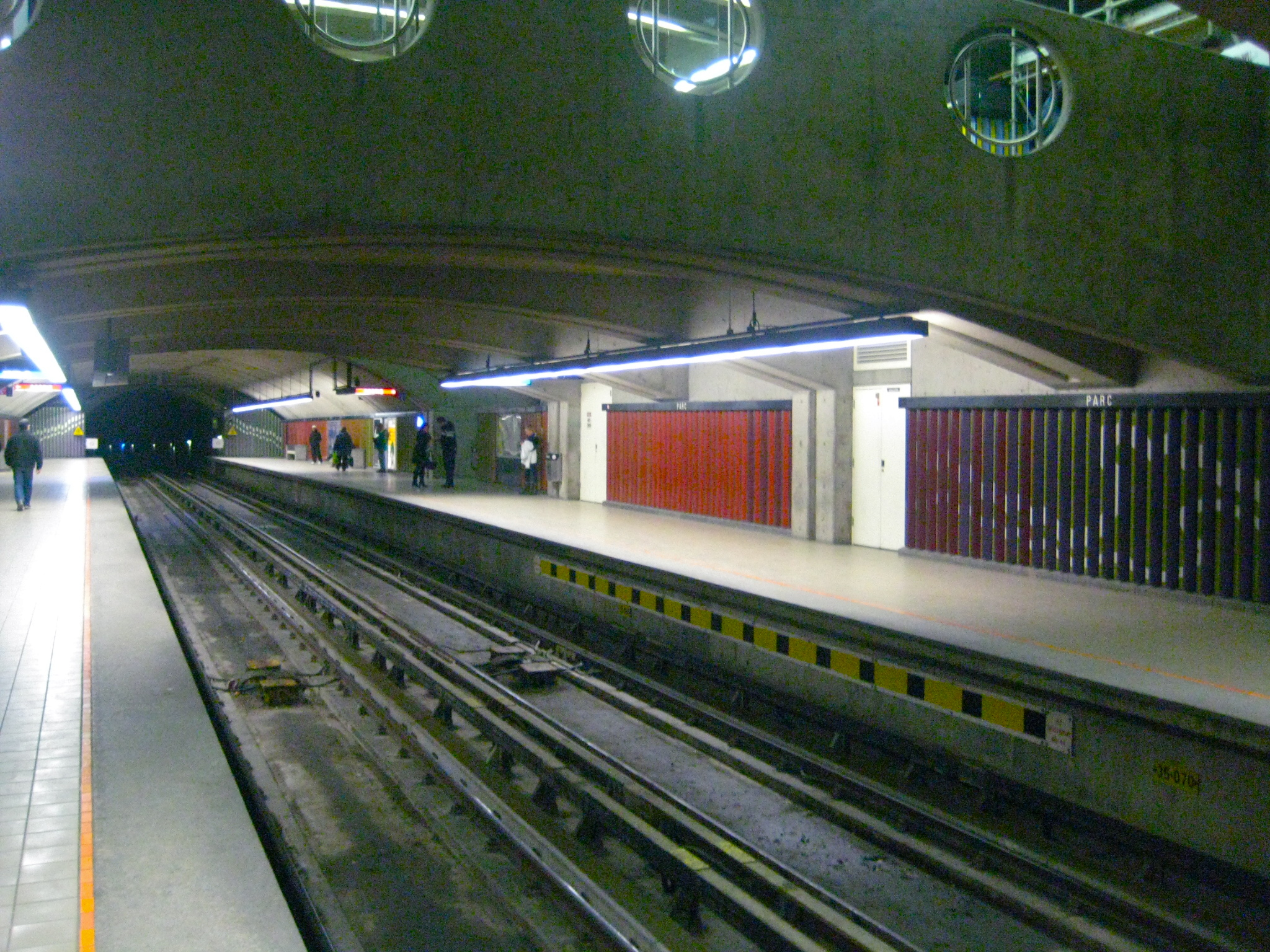

General information
- Location: 7245, Hutchison Street, Montreal, Quebec H3N 2Y8; Canada
- Coordinates: 45°31′49″N 73°37′26″W
- Operator: Société de transport de Montréal
- Platforms: 2 side platforms
- Tracks: 2
- Connections: STM bus; Saint-Jérôme line

Construction
- Depth: 15.1 metres (49 feet 6 inches), 35th deepest
- Accessible: No
- Architect: Blouin, Blouin & Associés; Colin M. Drewitt (Park Avenue Station)
- Architectural style: Montreal Metro

Other information
- Fare zone: ARTM: A

History
- Opened: 15 June 1987

Passengers
- 2024: 2,448,565 ▲9.65%
- Rank: 43 of 68

Services
Preceding station	Montreal Metro	Following station
Acadie toward Snowdon	Blue Line	De Castelnau toward Saint-Michel
Location

Parc station serves the Blue Line of the Montreal Metro. It is operated by the Société de transport de Montréal (STM).

The Metro station was built after the city purchased Jean-Talon station in 1984, and opened in 1987. The entrance was built in and under the building's far west end, with the entrance in the former men's smoking room. It is a normal side platform station. The platform level features a tabula scalata frieze by Huguette Desjardins, and the skylight at the foot of the stairs to the exit contains a sculpture called Métamorphose d'Icare by Claire Sarrasin, an homage to the local Greek community.

In 2022, the STM's Universal Accessibility Report noted that preliminary design work to make the station accessible was underway.

== Commuter trains ==
Parc
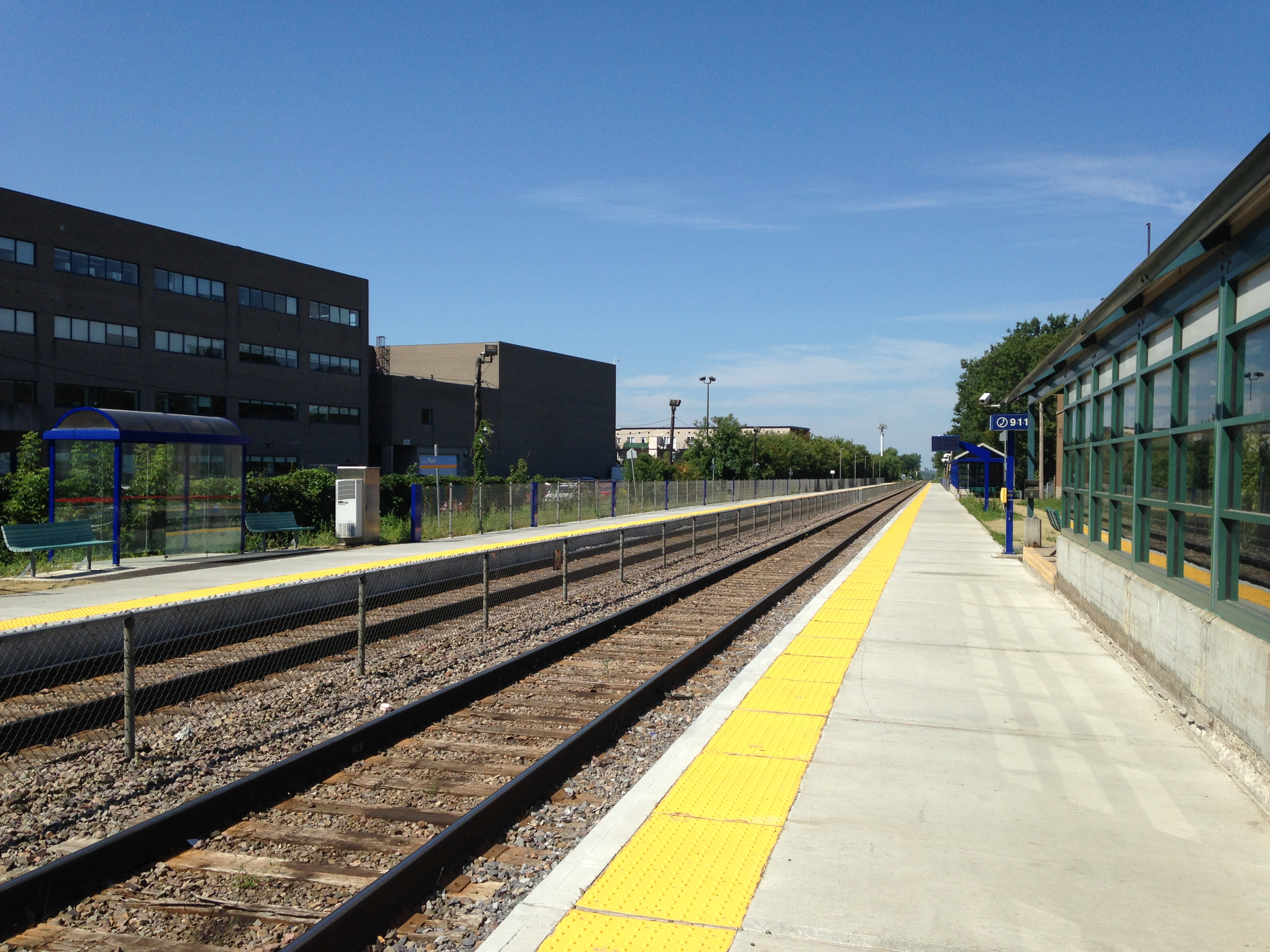

General information
- Location: 300 Ogilvy Avenue; Montreal, Quebec H3N 2Y4
- Operator: Exo (public transit)
- Platforms: 2 side platforms
- Tracks: 2
- Connections: Blue Line; STM bus

Construction
- Structure type: At-grade
- Parking: None
- Cycle facilities: 7 spaces
- Accessible: No
- Architectural style: Exo

Other information
- Fare zone: ARTM: A

History
- Opened: May 12, 1997

Passengers
- 2019: 863,500 (Exo)

Services
Preceding station	Exo	Following station
Chabanel toward Saint-Jérôme	Line 12 – Saint-Jérôme	Montréal-Ouest toward Lucien-L'Allier
Location

The Exo commuter rail operates a station immediately adjacent to the historic building. Parc station is part of Exo's Saint-Jérôme line. The Exo station's platforms are built along the main line; the space between the old Jean-Talon railway station building and the railway line, where the original platforms were located, is now occupied by a Maxi & Cie.

== Connecting bus routes ==
Société de transport de Montréal
No.	Route	Connects to	Service times / notes
16	Graham	Acadie; Ville-de-Mont-Royal	Daily
80	Du Parc	Place-des-Arts	Daily
92	Jean-Talon West	De La Savane; Namur; Canora; Acadie; De Castelnau; Jean-Talon	Daily
93	Jean-Talon	De Castelnau; Jean-Talon; Fabre; D'Iberville; Saint-Michel; Pie-IX BRT	Daily
365 ☾	Du Parc	Place-d'Armes; Place-des-Arts; Acadie; Ahuntsic	Night service
372 ☾	Jean-Talon	Saint-Michel; D'Iberville; Fabre; Jean-Talon; De Castelnau; Acadie; Canora; Namur	Night service
480	Express Du Parc	Place-des-Arts; Bonaventure; Gare Centrale; Terminus Centre-ville; Lucien-L'Allier	Weekdays, peak only

== Nearby points of interest ==
- CLSC Parc Extension
- IGA Stadium
- Jarry Park

== See also ==
- Opus card
