= Jean Talon Street =

Road in Montreal, Canada

Coordinates: 45.5387°N 73.6142°W

- Native name: rue Jean-Talon (French)
- Location: Montreal and Mount Royal
- West end: Devonshire Road, Mount Royal
- Major junctions: R-335 Saint-Denis Street; A-15 Décarie Expressway; R-125 Pie-IX Boulevard
- East end: A-40 (TCH) Metropolitan Autoroute, Anjou

Jean Talon Street (officially in French: rue Jean-Talon) is one of the longest streets on the Island of Montreal. It runs from Décarie Boulevard in the west through Anjou in the east to Galeries d'Anjou. Jean Talon was the first Intendant of New France. In the Town of Mount Royal, it is called Dresden Avenue. In the Montreal Borough of Saint-Léonard, it is colloquially known as Via Italia.

== Via Italia ==
Between Viau Boulevard and Langelier Boulevard in the Montreal borough of Saint-Léonard, Jean Talon Street passes through the heart of Montreal's Italian community and is nicknamed Via Italia. It is home to many Italian Canadian businesses and runs through the largest Italian-Canadian community in Montreal. There are 260,345 people of Italian ancestry living within the Greater Montreal Area.

== Transit stations on Jean-Talon Street ==
- Namur
- Canora station (REM)
- Jean-Talon
- Fabre
- D'Iberville

=== Within one block ===
- Acadie
- Parc
- Parc train station
- De Castelnau
- Saint-Michel

== See also ==
- 141 Jean Talon East
- Canora train station
- Little Italy, Montreal
- Jean-Talon Market
