= Jean-Talon station (Montreal Metro) =

Montreal Metro station

Jean-Talon
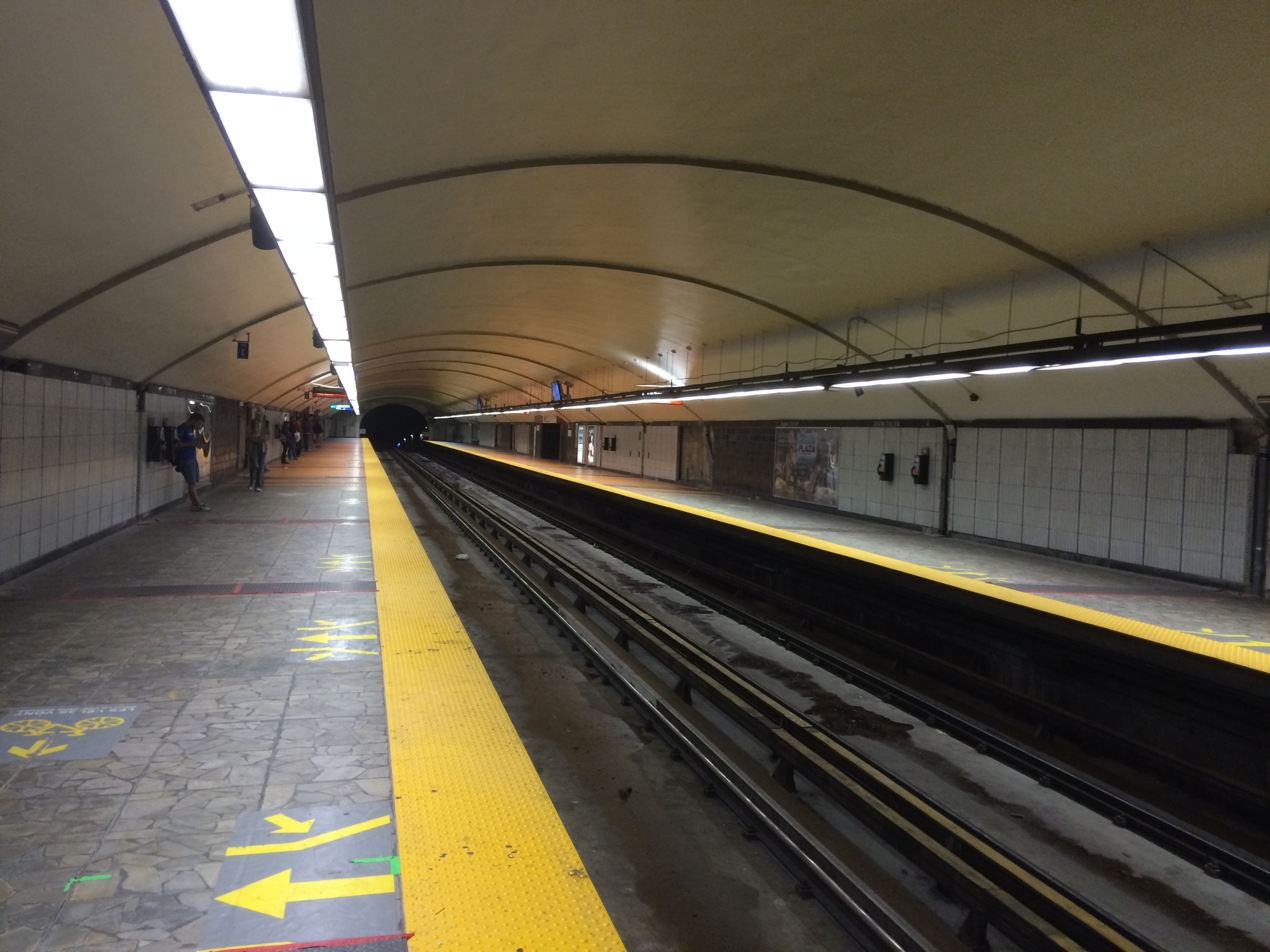

General information
- Location: rue Jean-Talon at rue Berri; Montreal, Quebec H2R 1T7; Canada
- Coordinates: 45°32′20″N 73°36′51″W
- Operator: Société de transport de Montréal
- Lines: Orange Line; Blue Line
- Platforms: Total: 4; Orange Line: 2 side platforms; Blue Line: 2 split platforms
- Tracks: Total: 4; Orange Line: 2; Blue Line: 2
- Connections: STM bus

Construction
- Depth: 10.4 metres (34 feet 1 inch) (Orange Line); 18.6 metres (61 feet) (Blue Line, Snowdon platform); 23.8 metres (78 feet 1 inch) (Blue Line, Saint-Michel platform), 8th deepest
- Accessible: Yes
- Architect: Duplessis, Labelle, Derome (Orange Line); Gilbert Sauvé (Blue Line)

Other information
- Fare zone: ARTM: A

History
- Opened: 14 October 1966 (Orange Line); 16 June 1986 (Blue Line)

Passengers
- 2024: 4,747,327 ▲5.12%
- Rank: 16 of 68

Services
Preceding station	Montreal Metro	Following station
Beaubien toward Côte-Vertu	Orange Line	Jarry toward Montmorency
De Castelnau toward Snowdon	Blue Line	Fabre toward Saint-Michel
Location

Jean-Talon (French pronunciation: [ʒɑ̃ talɔ̃]) is a station of the Montreal Metro rapid transit system, operated by the Société de transport de Montréal (STM). It is located in the Little Italy district on the border between the boroughs of Rosemont—La Petite-Patrie and Villeray–Saint-Michel–Parc-Extension in Montreal, Quebec, Canada.

It is a transfer station between the Orange Line and Blue Line. The Orange Line station opened on October 14, 1966, as part of the original network of the Metro.

== Overview ==
The original station was designed by Duplessis, Labelle et Derome. It is a normal side platform station built in a tunnel, with a mezzanine on its southern end giving access to several exits, including underground city access to the Tour Jean-Talon.

With the construction of the Blue Line in 1986, the station was greatly expanded. Two large volumes were dug, one on either side of the original station, giving access to the stacked Blue Line platforms below. This portion of the station was designed by Gilbert Sauvé, and included artistic tiling designs by the architect as well as a large mural by Judith Bricault. Another access was built leading to the Plaza Saint-Hubert, connecting to the eastern volume by an automated entrance. The Blue Line platforms were inaugurated on June 16, 1986.

Jean-Talon is the only one of Montreal's four transfer stations that was not built that way from the beginning.

In 2013, work began to make the station accessible at a cost of $9 million, with the installation of elevators. In June 2015, work was completed to make the Orange Line platforms accessible. In November 2019, it was announced that works to make the Blue Line platform accessible via elevator had been completed, making the Blue Line accessible for the first time.

The station has 4 entrances:

- 7100 Berri Street
- 430 Jean-Talon Street E.
- 522 Jean-Talon Street E.
- 780 Jean-Talon Street E. (automated entrance)

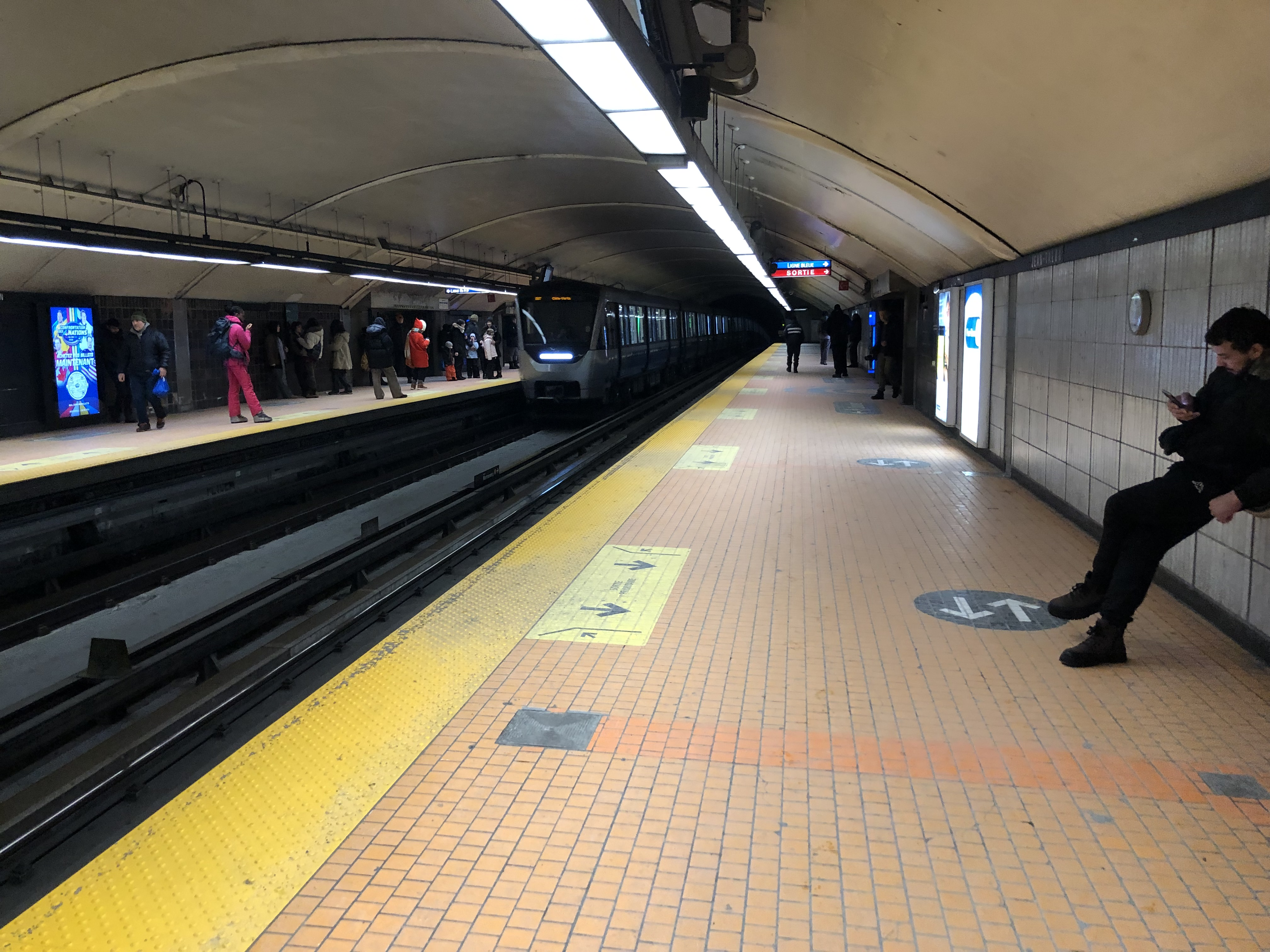
Orange Line platform

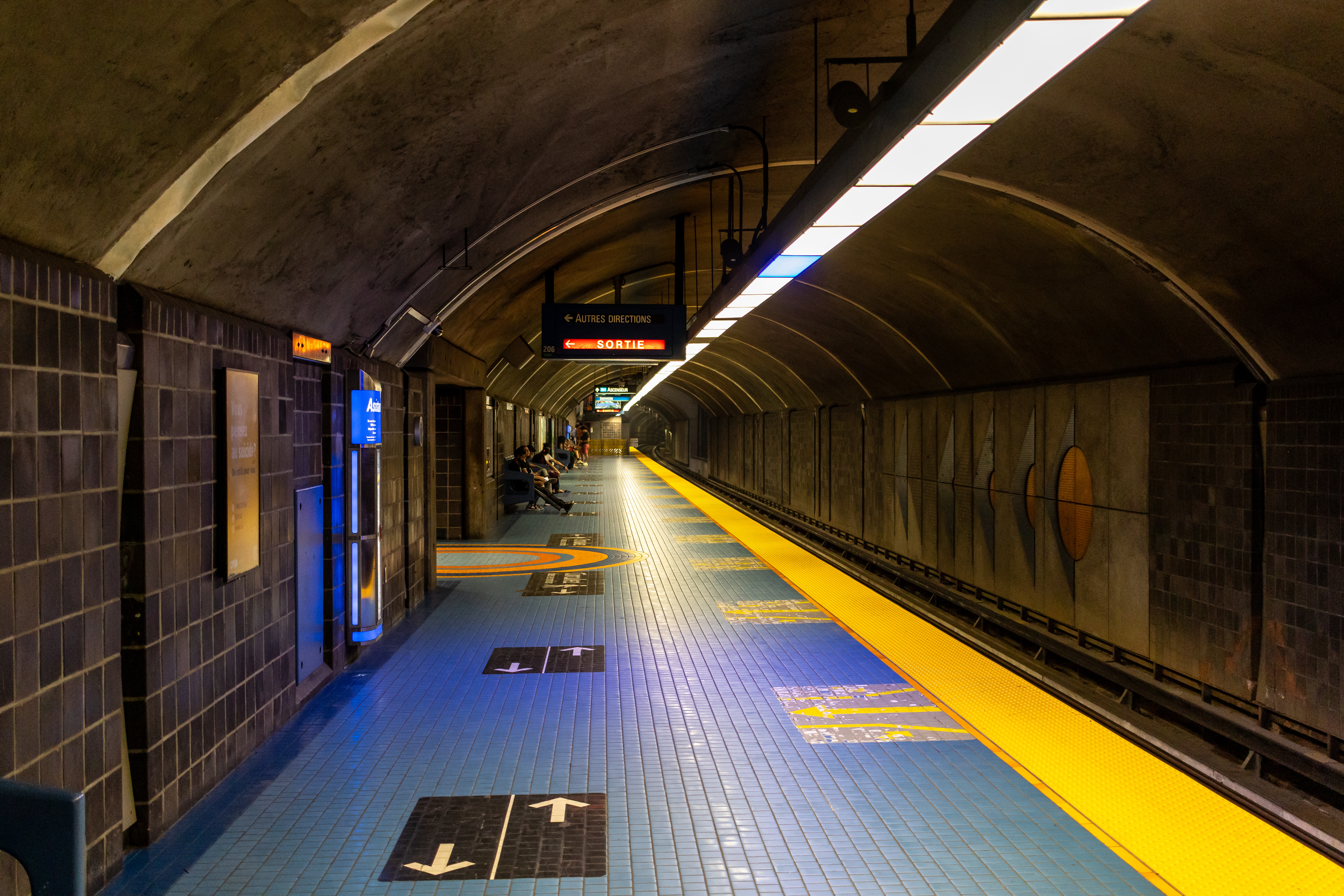
Blue Line platform

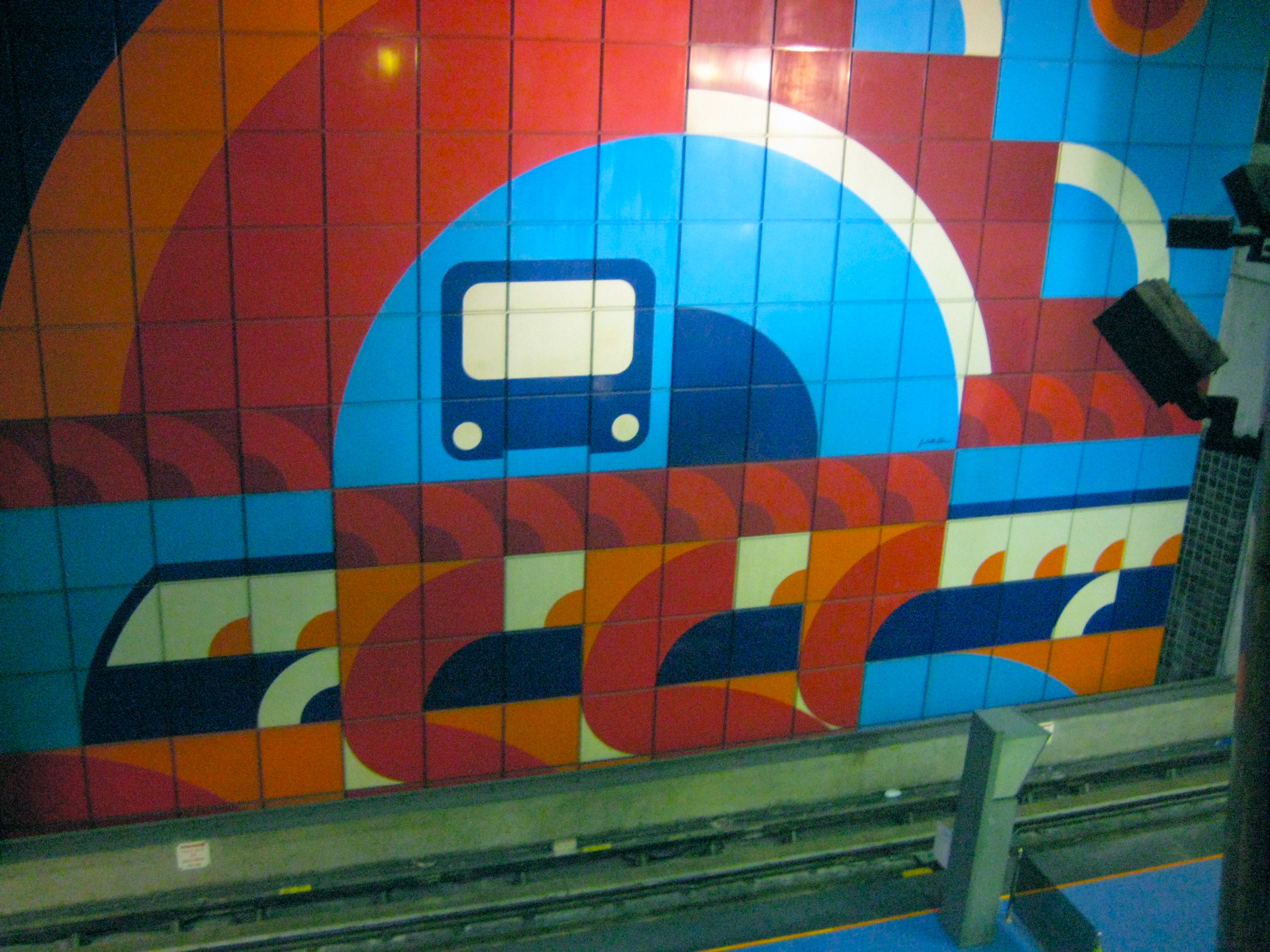
Art at Blue Line platform

== Origin of the name ==
This station is named for Jean-Talon Street. Jean Talon (1626–1694) served as intendant of New France from 1665 to 1668 and 1670 to 1672.

== Connecting bus routes ==
Société de transport de Montréal
No.	Route	Connects to	Service times / notes
31	Saint-Denis	Henri-Bourassa; Sauvé; Crémazie; Jarry; Beaubien; Rosemont; Laurier; Mont-Royal; Sherbrooke	Daily
92	Jean-Talon West	De La Savane; Namur; Canora; Acadie; Parc; De Castelnau	Daily
93	Jean-Talon	Parc; De Castelnau; Fabre; D'Iberville; Saint-Michel; Pie-IX BRT	Daily
95	Bélanger	Pie-IX BRT	Daily
99	Villeray		Daily
361 ☾	Saint-Denis	Replaces the Orange Line from Henri-Bourassa to Place-d'Armes	Night service
372 ☾	Jean-Talon	Saint-Michel; D'Iberville; Fabre; De Castelnau; Parc; Acadie; Canora; Namur	Night service

== Nearby points of interest ==
- Plaza Saint-Hubert
- Marché Jean-Talon
- Tour Jean-Talon
- Casa Italia — Centre culturel italien du Québec
- Church of the Madonna della Difesa
- Little Italy
