= Huguette Desjardins =

Canadian artist

Huguette Desjardins (born 27 February 1938) is a Canadian artist. A printmaker, painter and public artist, Desjardins is best known for her public artwork in Montreal's Parc Avenue Metro station, installed in 1983.

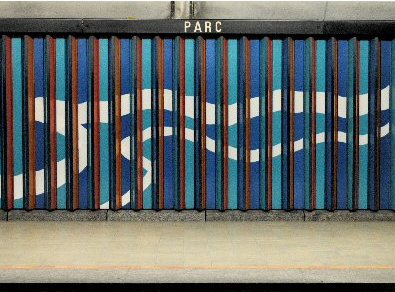
Detail of wall mural by Huguette Desjardins at Parc Avenue Metro station, Montreal.

Her work is included in the collection of the National Gallery of Canada.
