= Fabre station =

Montreal Metro station

Fabre
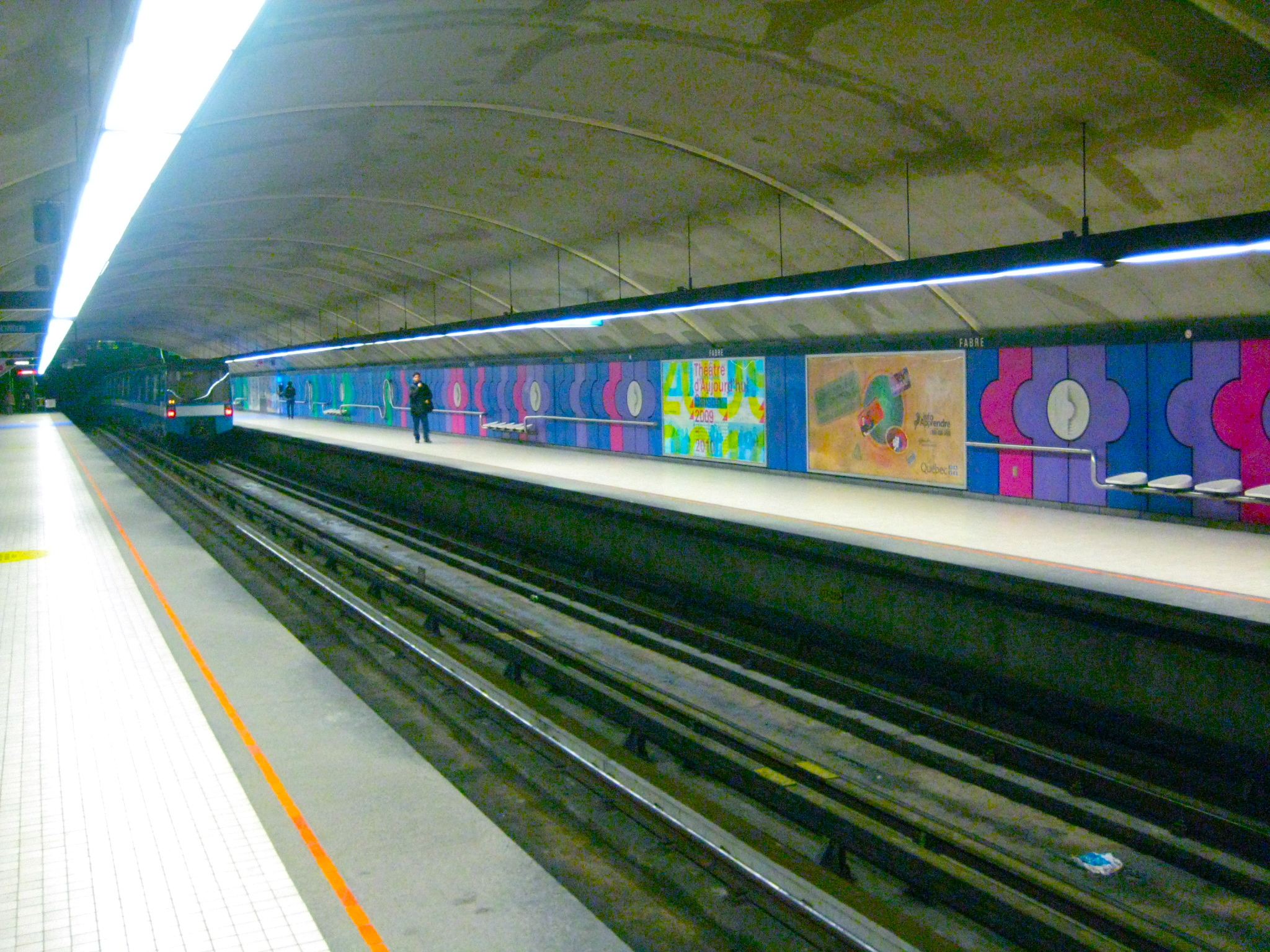

General information
- Location: 1737, rue Jean-Talon Est; Montreal, Quebec H2E 3B5; Canada
- Coordinates: 45°32′52″N 73°36′26″W
- Operator: Société de transport de Montréal
- Platforms: 2 side platforms
- Tracks: 2
- Connections: STM bus

Construction
- Depth: 13.0 metres (42 feet 8 inches), 40th deepest
- Accessible: No
- Architect: Bédard & Averna

Other information
- Fare zone: ARTM: A

History
- Opened: 16 June 1986

Passengers
- 2024: 2,044,220 ▲12.59%
- Rank: 52 of 68

Services
Preceding station	Montreal Metro	Following station
Jean-Talon toward Snowdon	Blue Line	D'Iberville toward Saint-Michel
Location

Fabre station (French pronunciation: [fabʁ]) is a Montreal Metro station in Montreal, Quebec, Canada. It is operated by the Société de transport de Montréal (STM) and served by the Blue Line. It is located in the Villeray neighbourhood.

== Overview ==
It is a normal side platform station with two entrances: one on rue Fabre and another on avenue Papineau. The brightly coloured murals and continuous handrail were designed by artist Jean-Noël Poliquin.

== Origin of name ==
Fabre is named for the nearby rue Fabre. The street name honours Monseigneur Édouard-Charles Fabre (1827–1896), Montreal's first archbishop (1886).

== Restoration of Jean-Noël Poliquin’s artwork ==
Restoration work for the artwork is underway at Fabre, to keep its architectural integrity at the station, with the walls becoming completely white during restoration, once the work is completed, the walls will go back to normal.

== Connecting bus routes ==
Société de transport de Montréal
No.	Route	Connects to	Service times / notes
45	Papineau	Papineau	Daily
93	Jean-Talon	Parc; De Castelnau; Jean-Talon; D'Iberville; Saint-Michel; Pie-IX BRT	Daily
359 ☾	Papineau	Papineau	Night service
372 ☾	Jean-Talon	Saint-Michel; D'Iberville; Jean-Talon; De Castelnau; Parc; Acadie; Canora; Namur	Night service

== Entrances ==
1737 Rue Jean Talon (at the corner of Jean Talon Street and Papineau Avenue)

1480 Rue Jean Talon (at the corner of Jean Talon Street and Fabre Street)

== Nearby points of interest ==
- Hôpital Jean-Talon
- Parc Villeray
