= De Castelnau station =

Montreal Metro station

De Castelnau
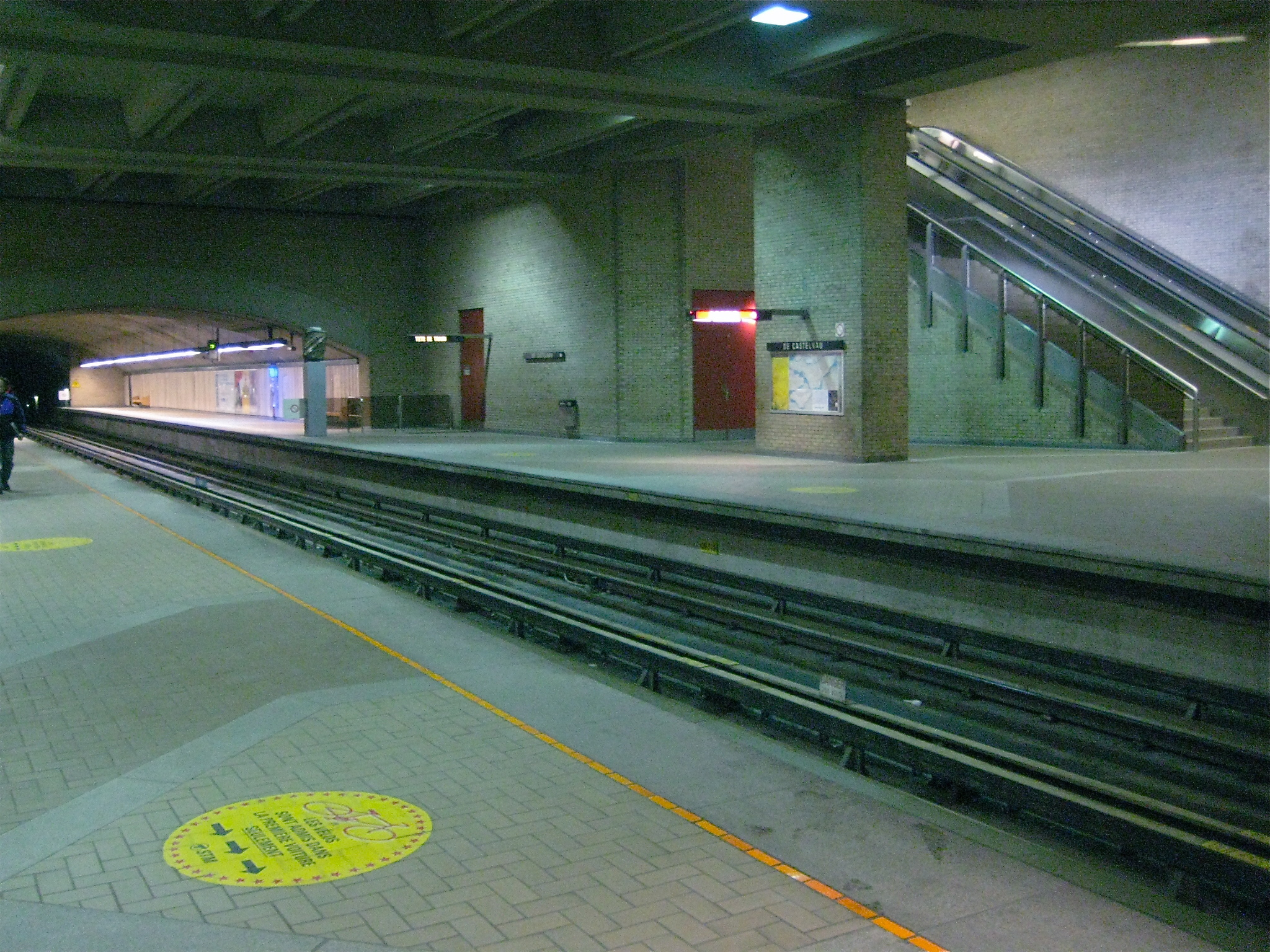

General information
- Location: 2, rue De Castelnau Ouest; Montreal, Quebec H2R 2Y6; Canada
- Coordinates: 45°32′07″N 73°37′12″W
- Operator: Société de transport de Montréal
- Platforms: 2 side platforms
- Tracks: 2
- Connections: STM bus

Construction
- Depth: 11.7 metres (38 feet 5 inches), 45th deepest
- Accessible: No
- Architect: Goyer, Collette, Hamelin, & Lalonde

Other information
- Fare zone: ARTM: A

History
- Opened: 16 June 1986

Passengers
- 2024: 1,273,589 ▲12.79%
- Rank: 64 of 68

Services
Preceding station	Montreal Metro	Following station
Parc toward Snowdon	Blue Line	Jean-Talon toward Saint-Michel
Location

De Castelnau station (French pronunciation: [də kastɛlno]) is a Montreal Metro station in the Villeray–Saint-Michel–Parc-Extension borough of Montreal, Quebec, Canada. It is operated by the Société de transport de Montréal (STM) and serves the Blue Line. It is located in the Villeray district.

== Overview ==
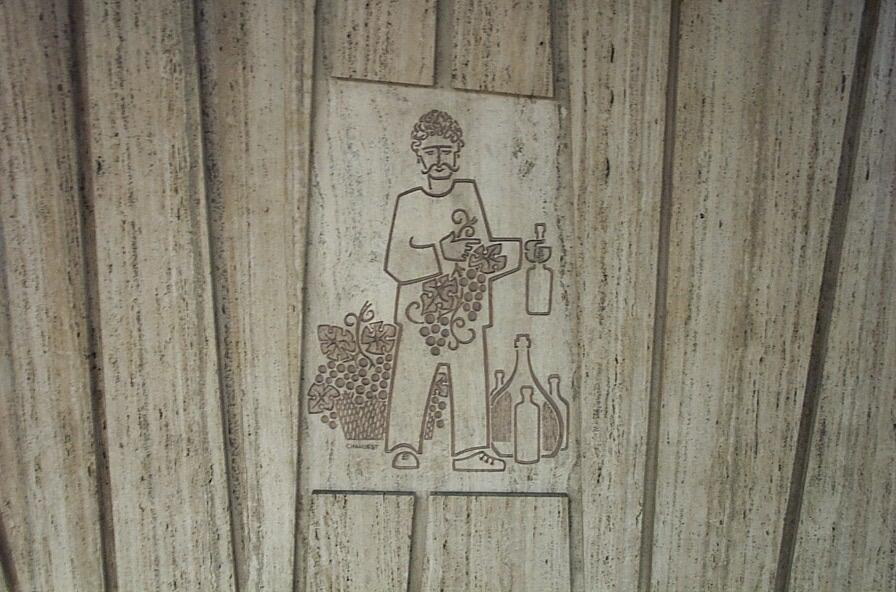
Bas reliefs by Jean-Charles Charuest

It is a normal side platform station, built in tunnel with a central volume built in trench. Two entrances, one on each side of boul. Saint-Laurent, give access to a common ticket hall; one is integrated into an apartment building. The station is clad in travertine limestone, a reference to the Italian community in the area, and whimsical bas reliefs by Jean-Charles Charuest depict scenes of the nearby Marché Jean-Talon.

== Origin of name ==
Rue De Castelnau is named for French general Noël Édouard, vicomte de Curières de Castelnau, who successfully defended the French town of Nancy during World War I.

== Connecting bus routes ==
Société de transport de Montréal
No.	Route	Connects to	Service times / notes
55	Saint-Laurent	Place-d'Armes; Saint-Laurent; Henri-Bourassa	Daily
92	Jean-Talon West	De La Savane; Namur; Canora; Acadie; Parc; Jean-Talon	Daily
93	Jean-Talon	Parc; Jean-Talon; Fabre; D'Iberville; Saint-Michel; Pie-IX BRT	Daily
363 ☾	Saint-Laurent	Henri-Bourassa; Place-des-Arts (southbound); Saint-Laurent (northbound); Place-d'Armes	Night service
372 ☾	Jean-Talon	Saint-Michel; D'Iberville; Fabre; Jean-Talon; Parc; Acadie; Canora; Namur	Night service

== Nearby points of interest ==
- Marché Jean-Talon
- Stade IGA (Stade Jarry)
- Parc Jarry
