= Césira Parisotto =

Césira Parisotto

Césira Parisotto, also known as Mère Anselme and Soeur Anselme-Marie (May 31, 1909 in Asolo – December 16, 1992) was an Italian-Canadian nun known for her charitable works.

== Early life ==
Parisotto took her religious vows as a nun in 1928. She spent six years teaching in Turin, and, in the aftermath of the Second Italo-Ethiopian War, worked at a military hospital in Jimma during the Italian occupation. Sources differ as to her actions after the 1941 defeat of the Italian forces, with some stating that she continued at the hospital until 1943, and others stating she was held in internment camps at Dire Daua and Harar.

After the war, Parisotto emigrated to Canada, arriving as part of a group of ten nuns on September 18, 1949. Under her leadership, the Sisters of Charity of Sainte-Marie ("Soeurs de la Charité de Sainte-Marie") founded several schools, healthcare facilities, and retirement homes in Quebec, as well as summer camps, and a college in Mexico.

== Recognition ==
Parisotto was inducted into the Order of Canada in April 1992, and was also a member of the National Order of Quebec, and of the Patriarchal Order of the Holy Cross of Jerusalem.

In 2025, Parisotto was chosen as the namesake of one of the five new stations on the Montreal Metro's Blue Line.
