= Namur station (Montreal Metro) =

Montreal Metro station

Namur
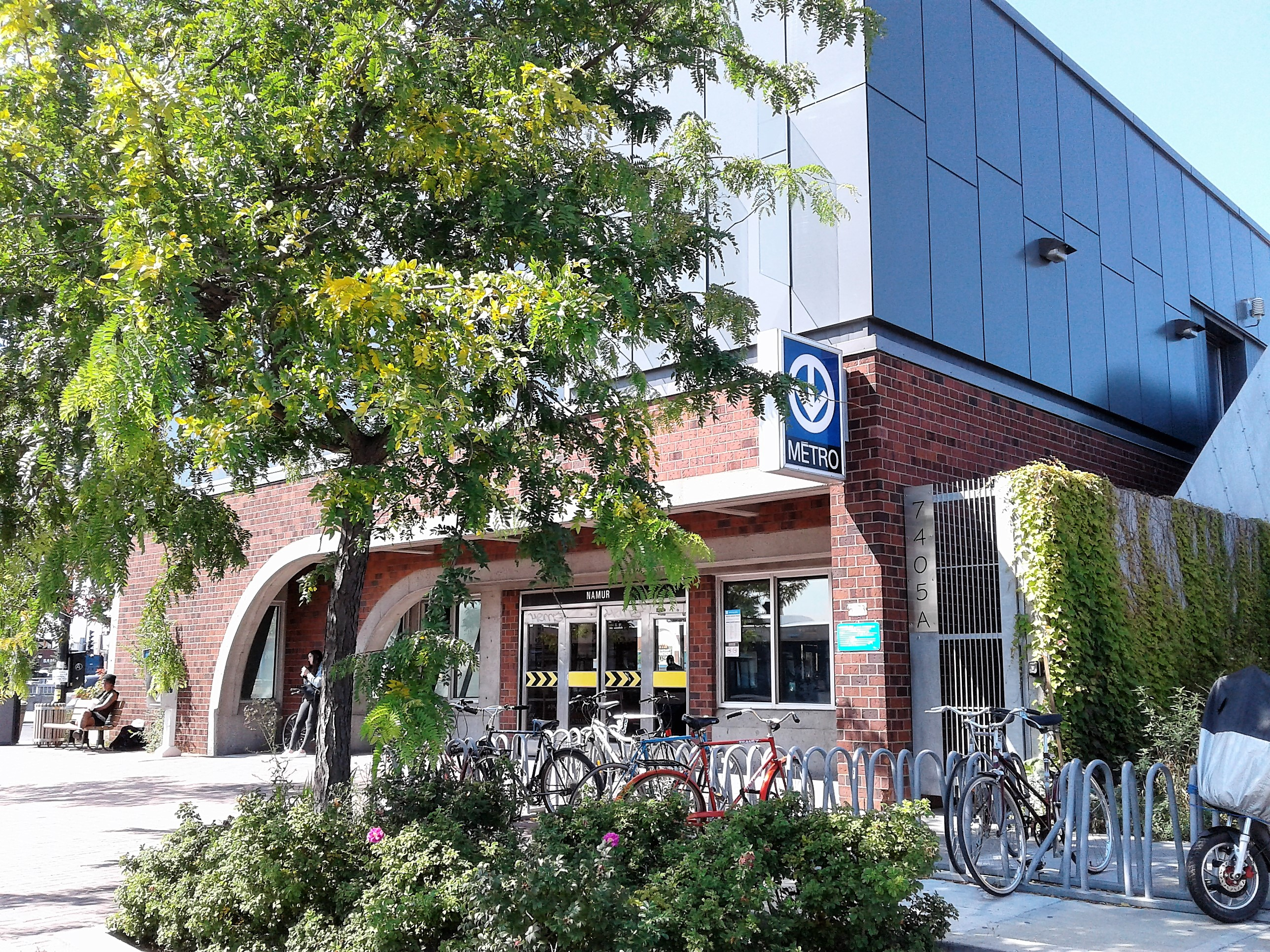

General information
- Location: 7405, Boulevard Décarie; Montréal, Quebec H4P 2G9; Canada
- Coordinates: 45°29′41″N 73°39′10″W
- Operator: Société de transport de Montréal
- Platforms: 2 side platforms
- Tracks: 2
- Connections: STM bus

Construction
- Depth: 24.1 metres (79 feet 1 inch), 7th deepest
- Parking: 428 spaces
- Accessible: No
- Architect: Labelle, Marchand et Geoffroy

Other information
- Fare zone: ARTM: A

History
- Opened: January 9, 1984

Passengers
- 2024: 2,568,768 ▲8.46%
- Rank: 41 of 68

Services
Preceding station	Montreal Metro	Following station
De La Savane toward Côte-Vertu	Orange Line	Plamondon toward Montmorency
Location

Namur station (French pronunciation: [namyʁ]) is a Montreal Metro station in the borough of Côte-des-Neiges–Notre-Dame-de-Grâce in Montreal, Quebec, Canada. It is operated by the Société de transport de Montréal (STM) and serves the Orange Line. It is located in the Côte-des-Neiges area. This station has a total of 428 parking spaces in two nearby parking lots.

== Overview ==
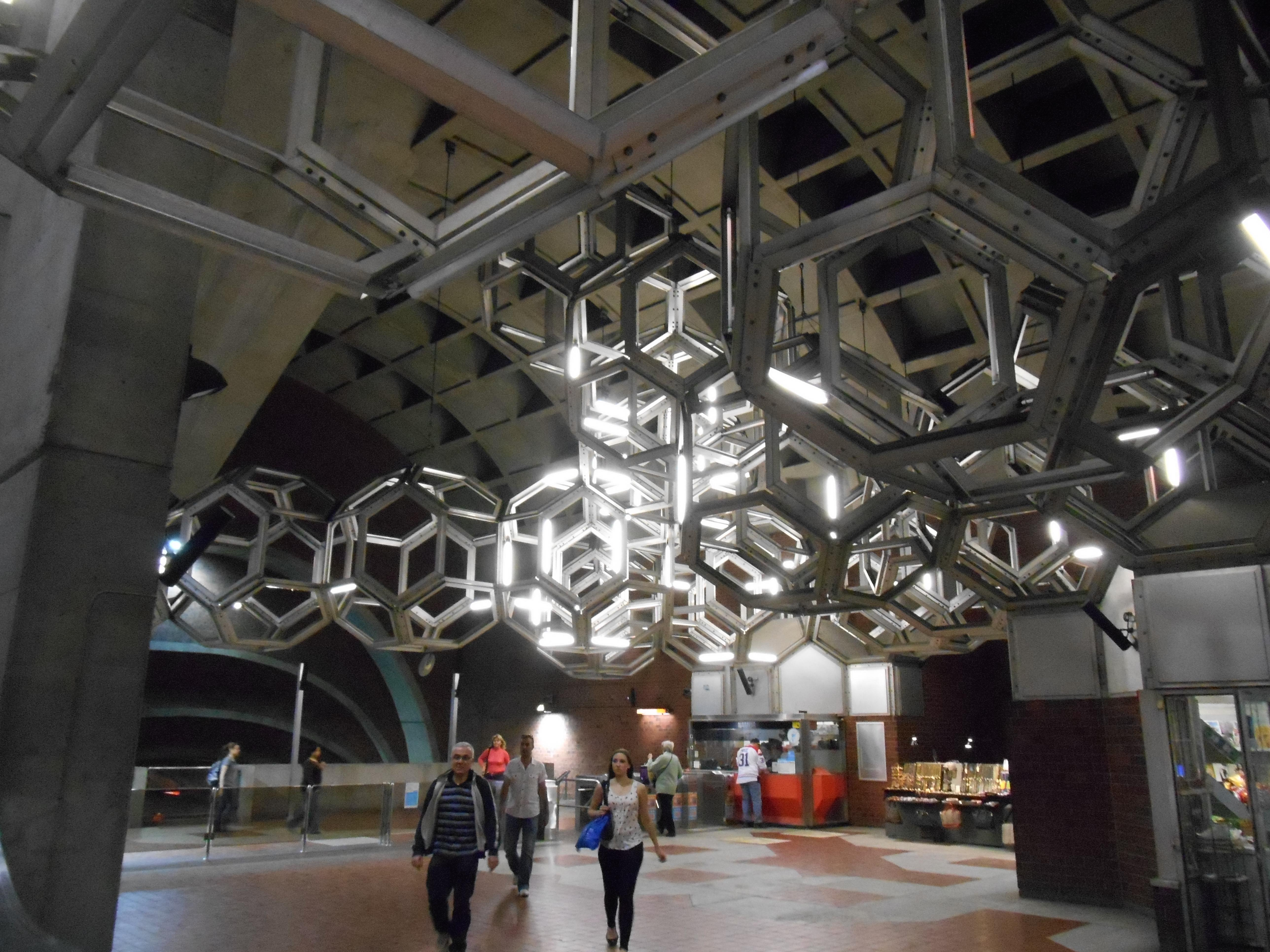
Namur station

The station is a normal side platform station with an entrance at the north end. It was planned in such a way as to allow an additional entrance to be built on the other side of the Décarie Autoroute, but this has not yet happened.

A redevelopment plan for the area is under discussion.

The station was designed by the firm of Labelle, Marchand et Geoffroy. The station's mezzanine contains a giant suspended illuminated aluminum sculpture, entitled Système, by noted Quebec artist Pierre Granche.

== Origin of the name ==
This station is named for Rue Namur, the former name for a portion of Rue Jean-Talon; the road had been renamed by the time the station was opened, so a nearby road (Rue Arnoldi) was renamed Namur in 1980 to allow the station to keep its name. Namur is a city and province in Belgium, which also lent its name to the town of Namur, Quebec.

== Connecting bus routes ==
Société de transport de Montréal
No.	Route	Connects to	Service times / notes
17	Décarie	Place-Saint-Henri; Vendôme; Snowdon; De La Savane; Du Collège; Côte-Vertu	Daily
92	Jean-Talon West	De La Savane; Canora; Acadie; Parc; De Castelnau; Jean-Talon	Daily
120	Royalmount	De La Savane	Weekdays only
368 ☾	Avenue-Du-Mont-Royal	Frontenac; Édouard-Montpetit; Université-de-Montréal; Côte-Sainte-Catherine; Plamondon; De La Savane; Côte-Vertu	Night service
369 ☾	Côte-des-Neiges	Côte-des-Neiges; Guy-Concordia; Atwater	Night service
371 ☾	Décarie	Côte-Vertu; Du Collège; De La Savane; Snowdon; Place-Saint-Henri; Lionel-Groulx; Atwater	Night service
372 ☾	Jean-Talon	Saint-Michel; D'Iberville; Fabre; Jean-Talon; De Castelnau; Parc; Acadie; Canora	Night service
376 ☾	Pierrefonds / Centre-ville	Atwater	Night service
382 ☾	Pierrefonds / Saint-Charles	De La Savane; Du Collège; Côte-Vertu; Bois-Franc; Sunnybrooke; Pierrefonds-Roxboro; Beaconsfield	Night service

== Nearby points of interest ==
- Décarie Autoroute
- Hippodrome de Montréal
- Gibeau Orange Julep
- Decarie Square Mall
- Montreal SPCA
- Jewish Community Council of Montreal

== See also ==
- List of park and rides in Greater Montreal
