= Saint-Michel station (Montreal Metro) =

Montreal Metro station

Saint-Michel
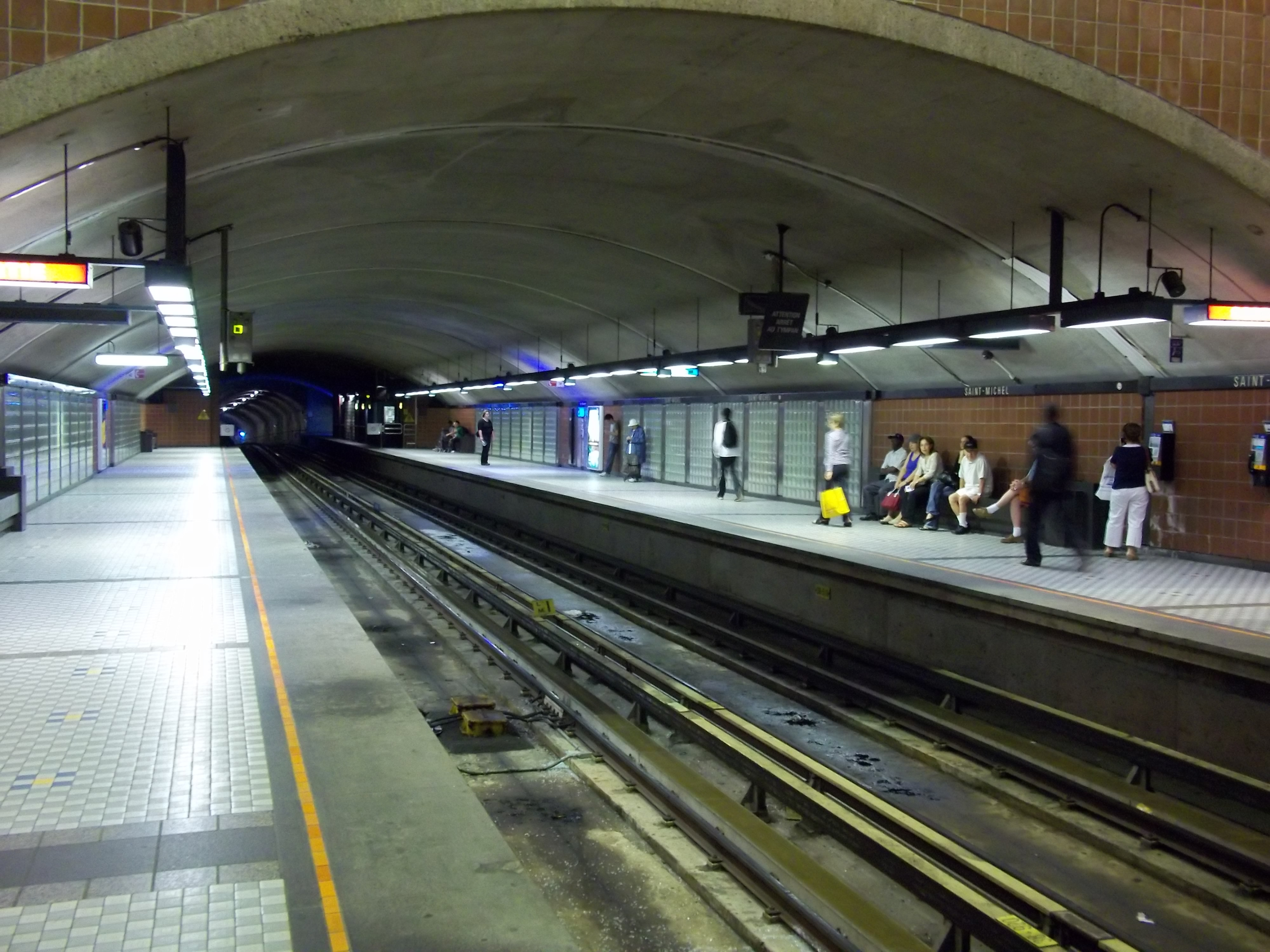

General information
- Location: 7270 & 7325, boul. Saint-Michel; Montreal, Quebec H3N 2H5; Canada
- Coordinates: 45°33′35″N 73°36′00″W
- Operator: Société de transport de Montréal
- Platforms: 2 side platforms
- Tracks: 2
- Connections: STM bus

Construction
- Depth: 15.8 metres (51 feet 10 inches), 33rd deepest
- Accessible: No
- Architect: Lemoyne & Associés

Other information
- Fare zone: ARTM: A

History
- Opened: 16 June 1986

Passengers
- 2024: 4,593,935 ▲11.13%
- Rank: 17 of 68

Services
Preceding station	Montreal Metro	Following station
D'Iberville toward Snowdon	Blue Line	Terminus
Location

Saint-Michel station (French pronunciation: [sɛ̃ miʃɛl]) is a Montreal Metro station in Montreal, Quebec, Canada. It is operated by the Société de transport de Montréal (STM) and is the eastern terminus of the Blue Line. It opened in 1986.

The station briefly closed down in October 2024 due to structural issues with the primary beams above the station's walkway. It was re-opened to the public on November 11, 2024.

== Overview ==
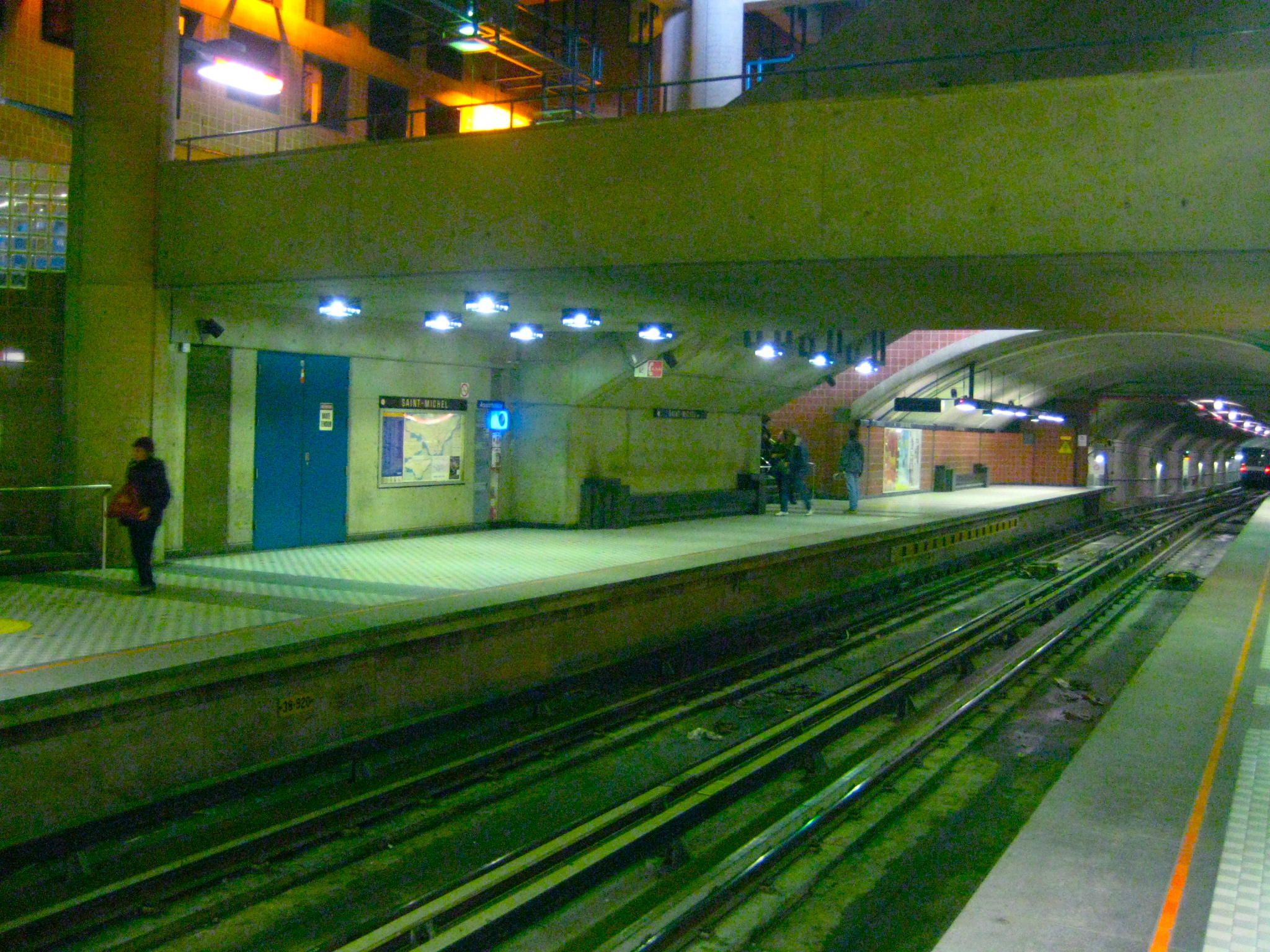
View of St-Michel from the platform.

It is a side platform station with two entrances on either side of boul. St-Michel connecting to a common ticket hall. Unlike all other stations on the Blue Line, the station is only as long as the six-car trains used on the line; all of the other stations were built to accommodate a nine-car train. However, the station cavern is long enough for a nine-car train; the extra space could be opened and finished to accommodate full-length trains when the STM extends the line east into the boroughs of St. Leonard and Anjou and to commit to the line's original design.

The platforms feature four abstract paintings under glass bricks, by Normand Moffat, Charles Lemay, Lauréat Marois, and Marcelin Cardinal.

== Origin of name ==
Saint-Michel station takes its name from the street under which it lies, boulevard Saint-Michel, named since about the late eighteenth century for the former Ville Saint-Michel within which it is located. Saint-Michel is the French Catholic title for the archangel Michael.

== Connecting bus routes ==
Société de transport de Montréal
No.	Route	Connects to	Service times / notes
41	Saint-Michel / Ahuntsic	Pie-IX BRT; Saint-Michel-Montréal-Nord; Sauvé	Weekdays only
67	Saint-Michel	Joliette	Daily
93	Jean-Talon	Parc; De Castelnau; Jean-Talon; Fabre; D'Iberville; Pie-IX BRT	Daily
141	Jean-Talon East	Honoré-Beaugrand; Pie-IX BRT	Daily
188	Couture	Pie-IX BRT	Weekdays only
357 ☾	Saint-Michel	Frontenac	Night service
372 ☾	Jean-Talon	D'Iberville; Fabre; Jean-Talon; De Castelnau; Parc; Acadie; Canora; Namur	Night service
467	Express Saint-Michel	Joliette	Weekdays only

== Nearby points of interest ==
- Little Maghreb
- Saint-Michel Library
- Centre administratif - Ville de Montréal
- Joseph-François-Perrault School
- John F Kennedy School
- François-Perrault Park
