= Snowdon station =

Montreal Metro Station

Snowdon

General information
- Location: 5111 Chemin Queen Mary, Montréal, QC H3W 1X4; Canada
- Coordinates: 45°29′08″N 73°37′41″W
- Operator: Société de transport de Montréal
- Lines: Orange Line; Blue Line
- Platforms: 4 split platforms (2 on each level)
- Tracks: 4
- Connections: STM bus

Construction
- Depth: 19.5 metres (64 feet) (upper platform); 24.6 metres (80 feet 9 inches) (lower platform), 6th deepest
- Accessible: Yes
- Architect: Jean-Louis Beaulieu

Other information
- Fare zone: ARTM: A

History
- Opened: 7 September 1981 (Orange Line); 4 January 1988 (Blue Line)

Passengers
- 2024: 4,037,820 ▲12.34%
- Rank: 24 of 68

Services
Preceding station	Montreal Metro	Following station
Côte-Sainte-Catherine toward Côte-Vertu	Orange Line	Villa-Maria toward Montmorency
Terminus	Blue Line	Côte-des-Neiges toward Saint-Michel
Location

Snowdon station is a Montreal Metro station in the borough of Côte-des-Neiges–Notre-Dame-de-Grâce in Montreal, Quebec, Canada. It is operated by the Société de transport de Montréal (STM) and is a transfer station between the Orange Line and Blue Line; it is the western terminus of the Blue Line. It is located in the Snowdon neighbourhood. The town of Hampstead is located nearby to the west, across Macdonald Avenue; one emergency exit from the station extends into Hampstead.

The station opened on September 7, 1981 with service on the Orange Line only, though the Blue Line platforms were built at the same time. At the time it was the western terminus of the Orange Line, taking over from Place-Saint-Henri station; it is thus the only station to have been the terminus of two different lines. Service on the Blue Line began on January 4, 1988.

== Overview ==
Platform arrangement at Snowdon

Escalator to platform

The station was constructed as an anti-directional cross-platform interchange, with three lateral tunnels containing two storeys each, joined by four cross-tunnels; both lines therefore have stacked platforms. This layout was intended to allow rapid transfer between a future extension into Notre-Dame-de-Grâce and service to downtown; this service never opened, and the station's layout means that most people who transfer between the Blue and Orange Lines must go down stairs.

The station's central access tunnel is connected at its western end to the station's single entrance, which is integrated into an STM control centre and contains a small sunken garden.

=== Accessibility ===
In October 2013, work began to make the station accessible. Construction involved building two elevators to connect both platform levels of the station, with a third elevator constructed to connect the upper platform level with the surface entrance. The only vestibule of the station underwent reconstruction. After completion, the surface elevator features its longest shaft in Montreal Metro, with the pit depth of about 25 meters. Work was completed by June 2016. However, the Blue Line itself was not accessible until Jean-Talon station (which also interchanges with the Orange Line) gained elevators in 2019.

== Architecture and art ==
Line 2 Platform

Platform access

The station was designed by Jean-Louis Beaulieu, who also provided sculptural grilles for the station's main staircase and the rear of the control building. The station's main artwork, a group of four murals by Claude Guité running the full length of the platform and entitled Les quatre saisons (the four seasons). The murals are painted on 500 panels of asbestos cement stretching the entire length of the platforms, they portray semi-abstract scenes of the foliage and weather associated with each of the four seasons. The seasons go in order, counterclockwise around the platforms, with winter on the Côte-Vertu platform, spring on Montmorency, summer on the Saint-Michel departure platform, and autumn on the Snowdon arrival platform.

Soon after the station opened the murals were victims of graffiti that badly damaged the artwork. Attempts of removing the graffiti destroyed large sections of the paintings. In 2004 the murals were all removed for a restoration plan by the STM to have the artist repaint the murals and slowly have them reinstalled in the station. As of June 2010 all the murals have been repainted, and are partially reinstalled on all four platforms of the station with a protective sheet of glass to prevent any future vandalism.

== Origin of the name ==
This station is named for the neighborhood in which it is located, named in turn for the owner of a farm on which it was built. The underground station platforms, located under Avenue Dornal, are approximately four blocks—about 250 m (270 yards)—east of the site of Snowdon Junction, a major transfer point during the streetcar era.

== Connecting bus routes ==
Société de transport de Montréal
No.	Route	Connects to	Service times / notes
17	Décarie	Place-Saint-Henri; Vendôme; Namur; De La Savane; Du Collège; Côte-Vertu	Daily
51	Édouard-Montpetit	Laurier; Édouard-Montpetit; Université-de-Montréal; Montréal-Ouest	Daily Some rush hour services start and end at Snowdon metro
166	Queen-Mary	Guy-Concordia	Daily Serves Ridgewood after 9PM
371 ☾	Décarie	Côte-Vertu; Du Collège; De La Savane; Namur; Place-Saint-Henri; Lionel-Groulx; Atwater	Night service
711	Parc du Mont-Royal / Oratoire	Mont-Royal	Runs 7 days a week during the summer and weekends only the rest of the year

== Nearby points of interest ==
- Décarie Autoroute
- Saint Joseph's Oratory
- Côte-des-Neiges–Notre-Dame-de-Grâce borough hall
- Notre-Dame-de-Grâce Library
- Collège International Marie-de-France
- University of Montreal Geriatrics Institute
- Segal Centre for Performing Arts (formerly the Saidye Bronfman Centre)
