= Saint-Michel, Montreal =

Neighbourhood in Montreal, Canada

Saint-Michel
- Neighbourhood
- Location of Saint-Michel in Montreal Saint-Michel (Canada)
- Coordinates: 45°33′50″N 073°36′35″W
- Country: Canada
- Province: Quebec
- City: Montreal
- Borough: Villeray-Saint-Michel-Parc-Extension
- Postal Code: H1Z, H2A
- Area codes: 514, 438

Saint-Michel (French pronunciation: [sɛ̃ miʃɛl]) is a neighbourhood in the Montreal borough of Villeray–Saint-Michel–Parc-Extension. It is named after a colonial-era road in the neighbourhood.

Its boundaries correspond to the former city of Ville Saint Michel, which was annexed to Montreal in 1968. This formerly independent city was known as Saint-Michel-de-Laval from its inception in 1912 to 1914 and Ville Saint Michel from 1914 to 1968. This was one of the last cities to be merged into Montreal before the 2002 municipal reorganization.

== Saint Michel Boulevard ==
Saint Michel Boulevard
- Interactive map of Saint Michel Boulevard
- Native name: Boulevard Saint-Michel (French)
- Former names: Montée Saint-Michel, path of Saint-Michel
- Location: Island of Montreal

Construction
- Inauguration: February 1, 1938

Saint-Michel Boulevard (French: Boulevard Saint-Michel) in Montreal is a broad north–south thoroughfare in the east of Montreal Island, Quebec, and crosses much of the island. Montreal also has a metro station called Saint-Michel.

=== History ===
It has an ancient origin. Called "Montée Saint-Michel" as early as 1707 and then "Chemin de Saint-Michel" or "Chemin du Sault," it was the main north–south axis of the area, leading north to Côte-Saint-Michel Road (now Crémazie Boulevard) and Sault-au-Récollet. The road was named in honour of Archangel Michael.

The boulevard, officially established in 1938, gave its name to the former municipality (and now district) of Saint-Michel, Montreal.

=== Sources ===
- Ville de Montréal, Les rues de Montréal, Répertoire historique, Montréal, Méridien, 1995, p. 377

== See also ==
- History of Montreal
- List of former cities in Quebec
