= Acadie station =

Montreal Metro station

Acadie
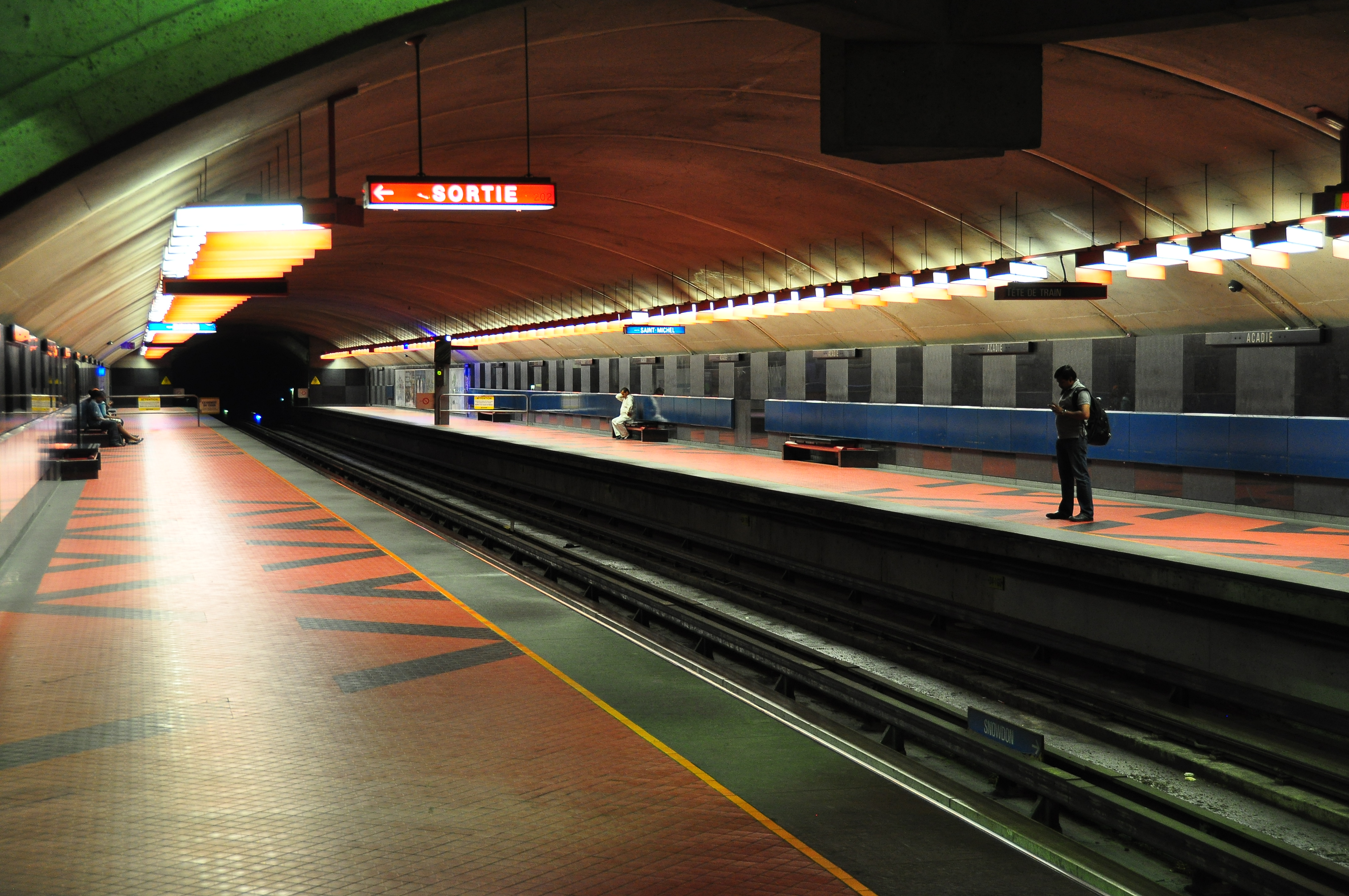

General information
- Location: 6900, boul. de l'Acadie, Mount-Royal, and 999, av. Beaumont, Montreal, Quebec H3N 2Y7; Canada
- Coordinates: 45°31′24″N 73°37′24″W
- Operator: Société de transport de Montréal
- Platforms: 2 side platforms
- Tracks: 2
- Connections: STM bus

Construction
- Depth: 16.5 metres (54 feet 2 inches), 30th deepest
- Architect: Pierre Mercier, Pierre Boyer-Mercier, and Patrice Poirier

Other information
- Fare zone: ARTM: A

History
- Opened: 28 March 1988

Passengers
- 2024: 1,290,260 ▲8.72%
- Rank: 59 of 68

Services
Preceding station	Montreal Metro	Following station
Outremont toward Snowdon	Blue Line	Parc toward Saint-Michel
Location

Acadie station is a Montreal Metro in Montreal, Quebec, Canada in the borough of Villeray–Saint-Michel–Parc-Extension (on the border with the town of Mount Royal, Quebec). It is operated by the Société de transport de Montréal (STM) and serves the Blue Line. It is located in the Parc-Extension.

== Overview ==
It is a normal side platform station. Two entrances on either side of boul. de l'Acadie lead to a common ticket hall. The station platform is decorated in bold colours such as blue, hot pink, black, and slate grey. The ticket hall is host to a tall clock and bench ensemble entitled Lieu de rendez-vous by Météore Design and the seating is by sculptor Michel Morelli. A series of whimsical photographic works by Jean Mercier showing people turning cartwheels and mid-air somersaults adorns the walls of the stairwell and passages to the exits.

== Origin of name ==
Acadie station was named for the Boulevard de l'Acadie (English: Acadie Boulevard), in turn named to remember Acadia, the site of the first permanent French settlement in North America.

== Connecting bus routes ==
Société de transport de Montréal
No.	Route	Connects to	Service times / notes
16	Graham	Parc; Ville-de-Mont-Royal	Daily
92	Jean-Talon West	De La Savane; Namur; Canora; Parc; De Castelnau; Jean-Talon	Daily
179	De l'Acadie	Ahuntsic	Daily
365 ☾	Du Parc	Place-d'Armes; Place-des-Arts; Parc; Ahuntsic	Night service
372 ☾	Jean-Talon	Saint-Michel; D'Iberville; Fabre; Jean-Talon; De Castelnau; Parc; Canora; Namur	Night service

== Nearby points of interest ==
- Centre commercial Place l'Acadie-Beaumont
- Clinique René-Laennec
- Université de Montréal - Campus MIL
- Centre Rockland

== Film and television appearances ==
Scenes from the 2000 Denis Villeneuve film Maelström were filmed inside Acadie station.
