= Mascouche line =

Commuter rail service in Greater Montreal, Quebec

Mascouche
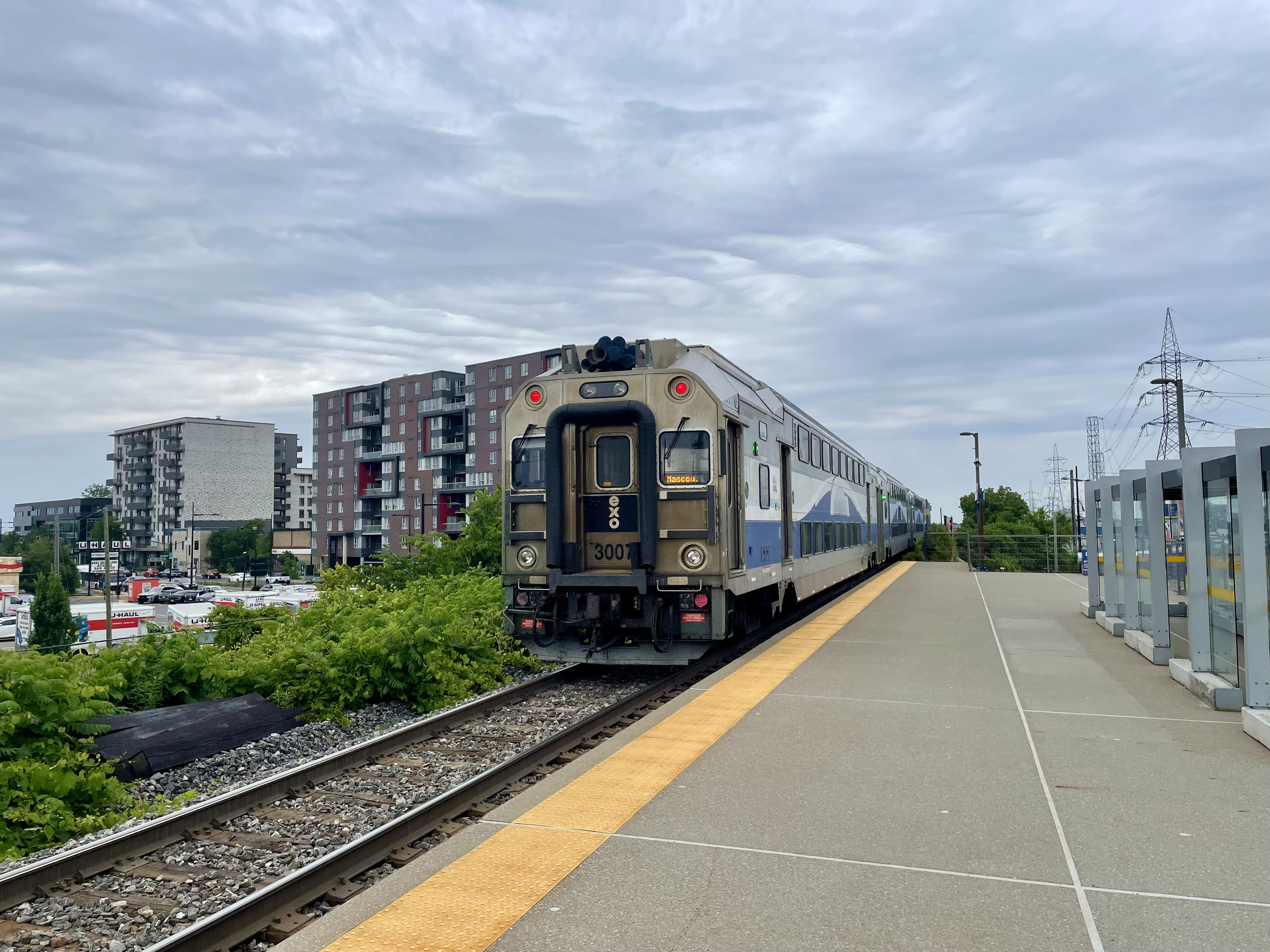
- Outbound train at Saint-Michel-Montréal-Nord station

Overview
- Line number: 15
- Locale: Greater Montreal
- Termini: Mascouche; Côte-de-Liesse
- Stations: 11
- Website: Exo – Mascouche line

Service
- Type: Commuter rail
- System: Exo commuter rail
- Operator: Alstom
- Daily ridership: 1,613 (2025)
- Ridership: 421,229 (2025)

History
- Opened: December 1, 2014; 11 years ago

Technical
- Line length: 44 km (27 mi)
- Track gauge: 1,435 mm (4 ft 8 1/2 in) standard gauge
- Operating speed: 75 mph (121 km/h)
Route map
Mascouche line highlighted in magenta

Mascouche (also designated line 15) is a commuter rail service in Greater Montreal, Quebec. It is operated by Exo, the organization that operates the commuter rail network in Greater Montreal.

Opened on December 1, 2014, the Montreal region's newest commuter train line required the construction of 10 new train stations, several civil engineering structures, and 13 km of new railway track. This includes some track in the median of Autoroute 640 between Repentigny and Mascouche.

The Mascouche line originally used the Mount Royal Tunnel en route to Central Station but the service was shortened in the 2020s when the tunnel was converted for use by the Réseau express métropolitain (REM). Mascouche is now the only Exo rail service to not reach Downtown Montreal. Connections to downtown can be made through transfer to the REM at Côte-de-Liesse or to the Metro at Sauvé station.

== History ==
=== Original service ===
The line was announced as the Repentigny-Mascouche line in a press conference on March 17, 2006, and follows a major campaign by residents of eastern Montréal and the northeastern suburbs to restore commuter rail service. Originally estimated at $300 million and expected to open in 2008, the line cost $670 million and opened on December 1, 2014. The project included 10 new train stations, several civil engineering structures and 13 km of new railway track.

The 51-kilometre (32 mi) line used the Mount Royal Tunnel and Canadian National track from Montreal's Central Station to Repentigny. New track was built from Repentigny to Terrebonne along Autoroute 640, before turning towards the Trois-Rivières Subdivision of the Chemins de fer Québec-Gatineau at Mascouche. Most of the route, in particular the section from Mont-Royal to Repentigny, follows a path similar to the never-built Line 6 of the Montreal Metro, which was planned as a steel-wheeled "regional metro" line using a somewhat similar alignment. The travel time between Mascouche and downtown Montreal was 61 minutes. The line had 13 stops and offered eight departures in each direction per weekday, mainly during rush-hour.

On June 1, 2017, the AMT was dissolved and replaced by two new governing bodies, the Autorité régionale de transport métropolitain (ARTM) and the Réseau de transport métropolitain (RTM). The RTM took over all former AMT services, including this line. In May 2018, the RTM rebranded itself as Exo, and rebranded each line with a number and updated colour. The Mascouche line became Exo 5, and its line colour was updated to a lighter pastel shade of purple.

=== Service adjustments ===
Beginning on May 11, 2020, the Mount Royal Tunnel closed due to the construction of the Réseau express métropolitain (REM), ending service to Mont-Royal and Canora stations. The Mascouche line terminated at Ahuntsic station, although some trains continued to Central Station via an alternate route partially using the CN Taschereau intermodal yard to access Central Station. On January 12, 2026, Côte-de-Liesse station opened, expressly designed to ensure smooth transfer of users between the Mascouche line and the REM, and replacing Ahuntsic as the line's new terminus.

In 2023, the service was renumbered to line 15 in order to be unique within the Montreal rail network.

== Locomotives ==
On May 14, 2007, the former Agence métropolitaine de transport (AMT) and New Jersey Transit issued a joint call for tenders to purchase dual-powered locomotives, a first of its kind in North America. Twenty ALP-45DP locomotives were delivered to the AMT from Bombardier Transportation to allow for dual-mode operations on the line. Until May 2020, locomotives on the Mascouche line switched from diesel to electric power, and vice versa, at Mont-Royal station (originally, this was planned to be at Ahuntsic station). This allowed trains to enter Mount Royal Tunnel to Central Station in electric mode.

With the closure of the Deux-Montagnes line for construction of the REM, there was no longer any need for dual-mode or electric locomotives on the Exo commuter network. As such, Exo ALP locomotives have since run in diesel mode exclusively. As of January 2026, the ALP locomotives are mostly used on other lines, while the Mascouche line is mainly operated by EMD F59PH locomotives hauling 3000-series Bombardier MultiLevel Coaches, in 3-car trainsets.

== List of stations ==
There are 11 current stations on the Mascouche line:

Station	Location	Connections	Zones
Mascouche	Mascouche	Exo: 2, 30, 417	C
Terrebonne	Terrebonne	Exo: 140	C
Repentigny	Repentigny	Exo: 5, 9, 14, 100	C
Pointe-aux-Trembles	Borough of Rivière-des-Prairies–Pointe-aux-Trembles	STM: 40, 86, 186, 430, 486	A
Rivière-des-Prairies	Borough of Rivière-des-Prairies–Pointe-aux-Trembles	STM: 48, 49, 81, 428, 449 STM: 289	A
Anjou	Borough of Rivière-des-Prairies–Pointe-aux-Trembles	STM: 40; STM: 285, 288	A
Saint-Léonard-Montréal-Nord	Boroughs of Montréal-Nord and Saint-Léonard	STM: 32, 33, 43, 432, 440	A
Saint-Michel-Montréal-Nord	Boroughs of Montréal-Nord and Villeray–Saint-Michel–Parc-Extension	STM: 39, 41, 139, 355, 439, 440	A
Sauvé	Borough of Ahuntsic-Cartierville	Sauvé Metro station; Buses	A
Ahuntsic	Borough of Ahuntsic-Cartierville	STM: 20, 54, 121, 140, 179, 365	A
Côte-de-Liesse	Borough of Saint-Laurent	Réseau express métropolitain	A

Former stations
Station	Service ended	Location	Connections
Mont-Royal	May 8, 2020	Town of Mount-Royal	STM
Canora	May 8, 2020	Town of Mount-Royal / borough of Côte-des-Neiges–Notre-Dame-de-Grâce	STM
Central Station	January 9, 2026	Borough of Ville-Marie	Via Rail; Amtrak; Réseau express métropolitain; Terminus Centre-Ville; Bonaventure station; Buses

== Criticism of route ==
Most observers agree that the proposed route from Montreal to Repentigny makes sense for several reasons, including the use of existing infrastructure. The route from Repentigny to Mascouche has been criticized for several reasons.

- 12 km of track was built from Repentigny to Mascouche, mostly in a highway median.
- In the Le Gardeur sector of Repentigny, the new track passes very close to a large General Dynamics munitions plant, where explosives are stored and processed. Both GD and Natural Resources Canada, which regulates explosives in Canada, have raised safety and security issues; as a protective measure, Exo has built a large canopied shelter wall and berm between the tracks and the plant.
- The route does not serve cities east of Repentigny, particularly L'Assomption and Joliette, which instead have bus service to Repentigny.
- The Mascouche line could have used the CP line that leaves the Saint-Jérôme line at St. Martin Junction, in Laval, also serving the eastern part of that city.

== Predecessor services ==
Two former commuter train lines ran along part of the route of the line.

=== CN Montreal North commuter line ===
CN operated a commuter service from Central Station to Montreal North from 1946 until November 8, 1968. An electric locomotive and several coaches ran one round trip a day in each direction, in rush hours only. Stations going east along the CN St Laurent Subdivision from Eastern Junction where it meets the Deux-Montagnes line were:

- Boulevard, at boulevard St. Laurent, which divides Montreal into East and West
- Ahuntsic, site of former Via Rail station
- Sault-au-Récollet, near rue d'Iberville
- St. Vital, at boulevard St. Michel
- Pie-IX, at boulevard Pie-IX
- Ste. Gertrude, at boulevard Ste. Gertrude
- Montreal North, at boulevard Lacordaire

Ridership was never very high. Near the end, most remaining passengers preferred to switch to the Sauve Metro station on the Orange Line of the Montreal Metro which opened October 14, 1966. Congestion on that part of the line was one of the reasons the Mascouche line was inaugurated.

=== Métropolitrain ===
A temporary service dubbed the "Métropolitrain" was organized by the STCUM from May 15 to October 12, 1990, while Autoroute 40 (Autoroute Métropolitaine) was being rebuilt. It ran on then-Canadian National track from near the Du Collège Metro station to Repentigny with an intermediate station near the Sauvé Metro station. Three trips ran each way in each weekday rush hour. There was no direct service to central Montreal. As there was no existing regional transit coordinator at the time, the line was never very successful. The six stations were:

- Du Collège (Ste-Croix and St-Louis)
- Sauvé (Ahuntsic railway station)
- Lacordaire (Saint-Leonard)
- Rivière des Prairies
- Pointe-aux-Trembles (Bout-de-l'Île)
- Charlemagne–Repentigny

== See also ==
- List of Montreal bus routes
