= Ville-de-Mont-Royal station =

REM station in Mount-Royal, Quebec, Canada

Ville-de-Mont-Royal
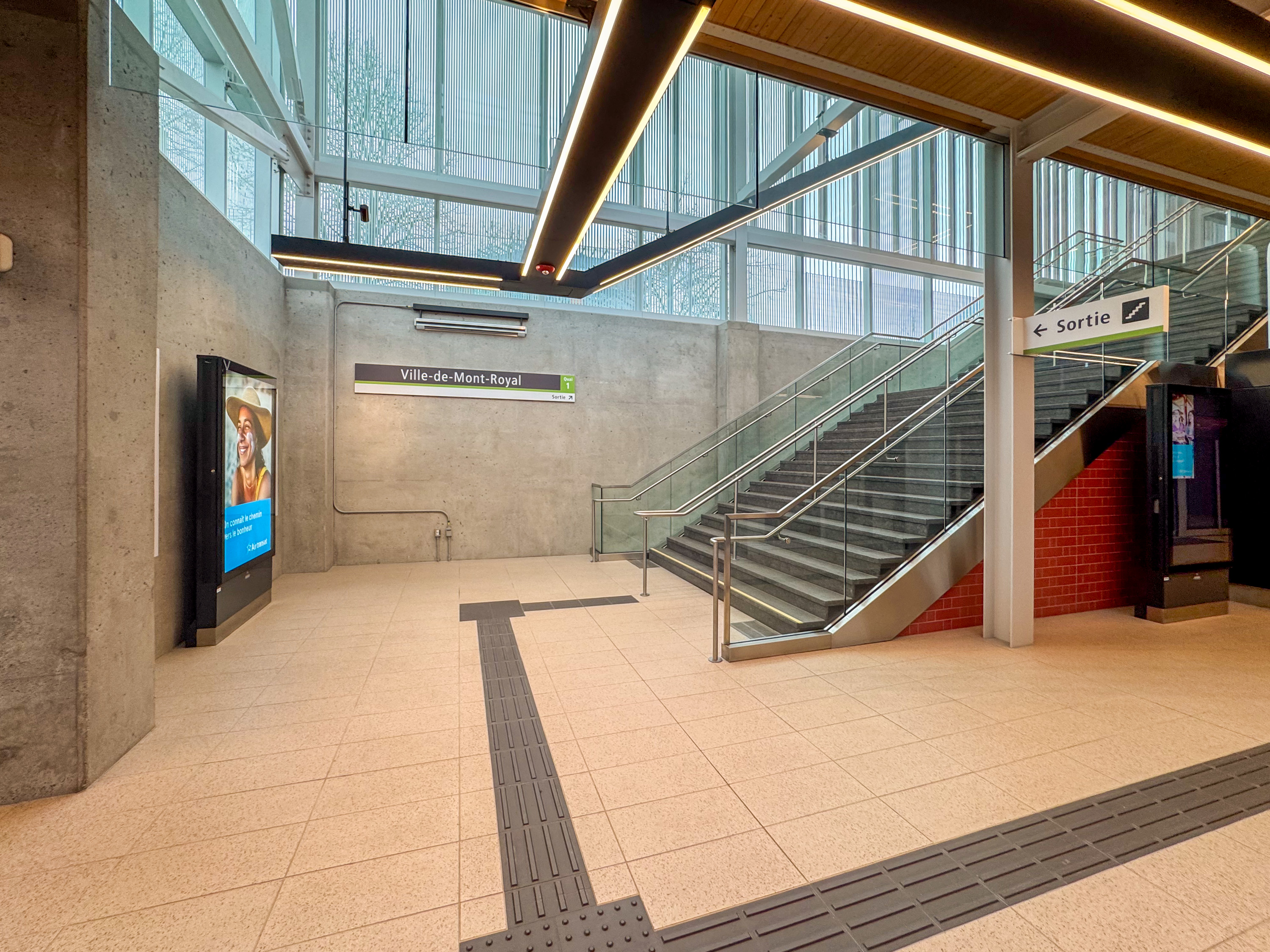
- Ville-de-Mont-Royal station stairs to the platform

General information
- Location: 1300 Canora Road; Mount Royal, Quebec; Canada
- Coordinates: 45°31′01″N 73°38′42″W
- Operator: Pulsar (AtkinsRéalis and Alstom)
- Platforms: 2 side platforms
- Tracks: 2
- Connections: STM bus

Construction
- Structure type: Below-grade
- Cycle facilities: 20 rack spaces
- Accessible: Yes

Other information
- Station code: MRL
- Fare zone: ARTM: A
- Website: rem.info/en/travelling/stations/ville-de-mont-royal

History
- Opened: 1918
- Closed: May 11, 2020
- Rebuilt: 17 November 2025 (REM)
- Former names: Mont-Royal

Passengers
- 2019: 270,700 Deux-Montagnes; 47,900 Mascouche; 318,600 Total (Exo)

Services
Preceding station	REM	Following station
Côte-de-Liesse toward Deux-Montagnes or Anse-à-l'Orme	Réseau express métropolitain	Canora toward Brossard
Future services
Preceding station	REM	Following station
Côte-de-Liesse toward Airport	Réseau express métropolitain (opens 2027)	Canora toward Brossard
Former services
Preceding station	Exo	Following station
Montpellier toward Deux-Montagnes	Deux-Montagnes	Canora toward Montreal
Ahuntsic toward Mascouche	Line 15 – Mascouche	Canora toward Montreal
Preceding station	Canadian National Railway	Following station
Services in 1948
Ahuntsic toward Rawdon	Montreal – Rawdon; Local stops	Portal Heights toward Montreal
Val Royal toward Lac Remi	Montreal – Lac Remi	Montreal Terminus
Vertu toward St. Eustache-sur-le-Lac or Hawkesbury	St. Eustache-sur-le-Lac services	Portal Heights toward Montreal
Location

Ville-de-Mont-Royal (French pronunciation: [vil d(ə) mɔ̃ ʁwajal]) is a Réseau express métropolitain (REM) station that opened on 17 November 2025. It is located in Mount Royal, Quebec, about 700 metres (2,300 ft) northwest of Canora station.

The REM station replaced a train station named Mont-Royal, a commuter rail station operated by Exo. It was served by the Deux-Montagnes and Mascouche lines until its closure in 2020.

== Location ==
The station is located at the eastern end of the traffic circle created by Graham and Laird boulevards, between and between Lombard Crescent and Dunkirk road. Connaught Park is inside this traffic circle.

== Facilities ==
The REM line, like the commuter train line before it, crosses through the Town of Mount Royal in a below-grade cutting. Ville-de-Mont-Royal station features two enclosed side platforms along the tracks, with platform screen doors. At its south end, a crossover and ticket hall are located at grade, housing the station entrance which faces Cornwall Avenue and Station Square. Two elevators connect the ticket hall and platforms for wheelchair accessibility.

== Origin of name ==
Ville-de-Mont-Royal takes its name from the Town of Mount Royal (French: Ville de Mont-Royal), where the station is located; the town in turn, takes its name from Mount Royal, the mountain that dominates the Island of Montreal. While the REM was being planned, the station name was changed from Mont-Royal to Ville-de-Mont-Royal to avoid confusion with an unrelated metro station named Mont-Royal.

== History ==
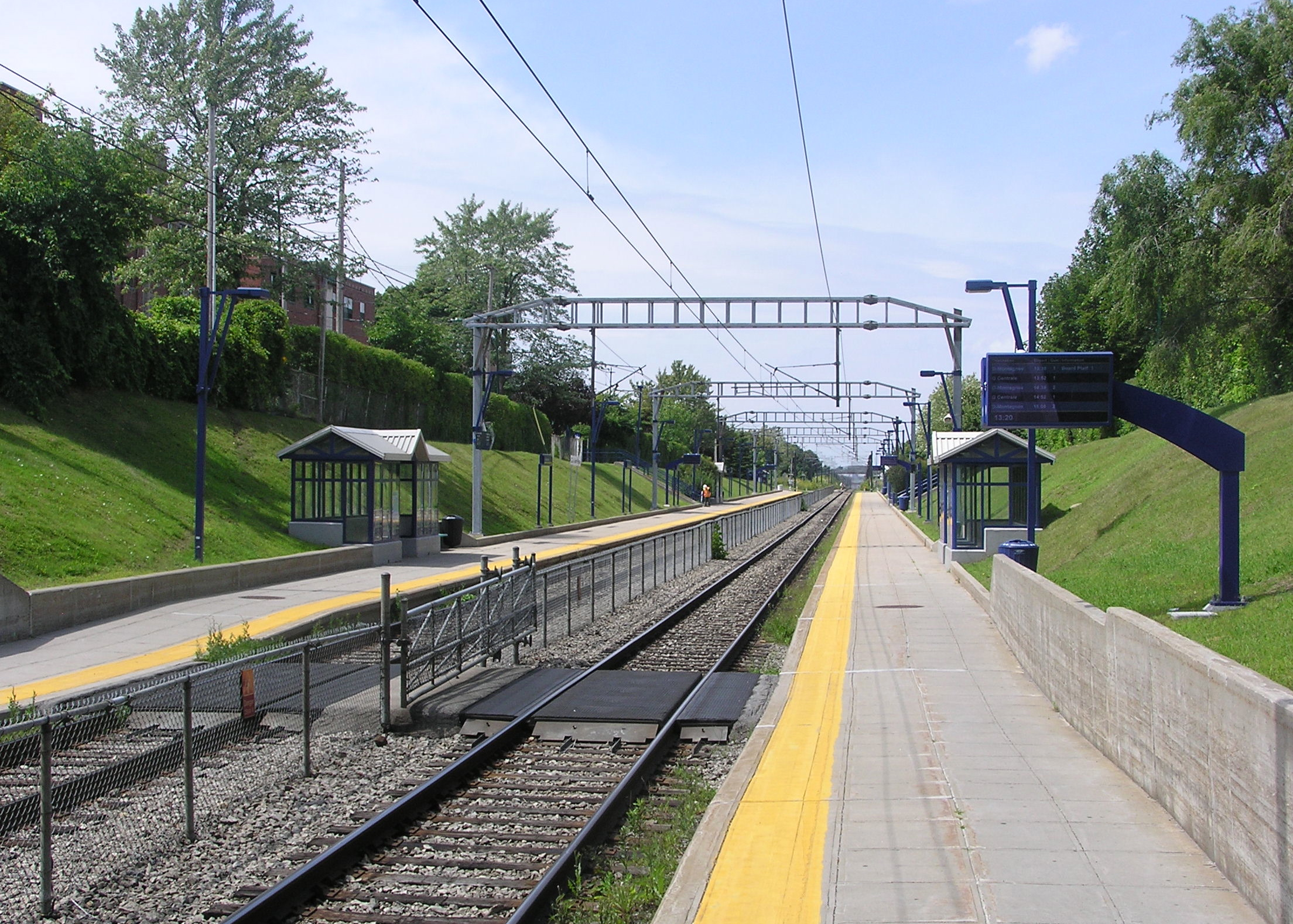
Mont-Royal station platforms in 2013

Mont-Royal train station was until 1992 a stop for Via Rail passenger trains leaving or approaching Montreal's Central Station on this track. It continued to serve as a commuter train station on the Deux-Montagnes line until its closure. The Mascouche line started service on 1 December 2014.

Beginning in May 2018, due to its 4-year-long process of being converted to light rapid transit, only one of its two platforms was used for travel in both directions; the same was true for its neighbouring station Canora. Both stations were closed on May 20, 2019, and were replaced with a single temporary station called Canora—Mont-Royal. That station was closed and the section of the line shut down on May 11, 2020.

The station was originally scheduled to reopen in 2024 as a light metro station in the second phase of the Réseau express métropolitain, then it was later pushed back to November 2025. The REM station opened for regular service on November 17, 2025.

The historic train station building still exists immediately to the west of the REM station; it currently hosts a restaurant.

== Connecting bus routes ==
Société de transport de Montréal
No.	Route	Connects to	Service times / notes
16	Graham	Parc; Acadie	Daily
119	Rockland	Outremont; Laurier	Daily
165	Côte-des-Neiges	Côte-des-Neiges; Guy-Concordia	Daily
TA ♿︎	STM Transport adapté		
