= Canora station =

REM station in Montreal, Quebec, Canada

Canora
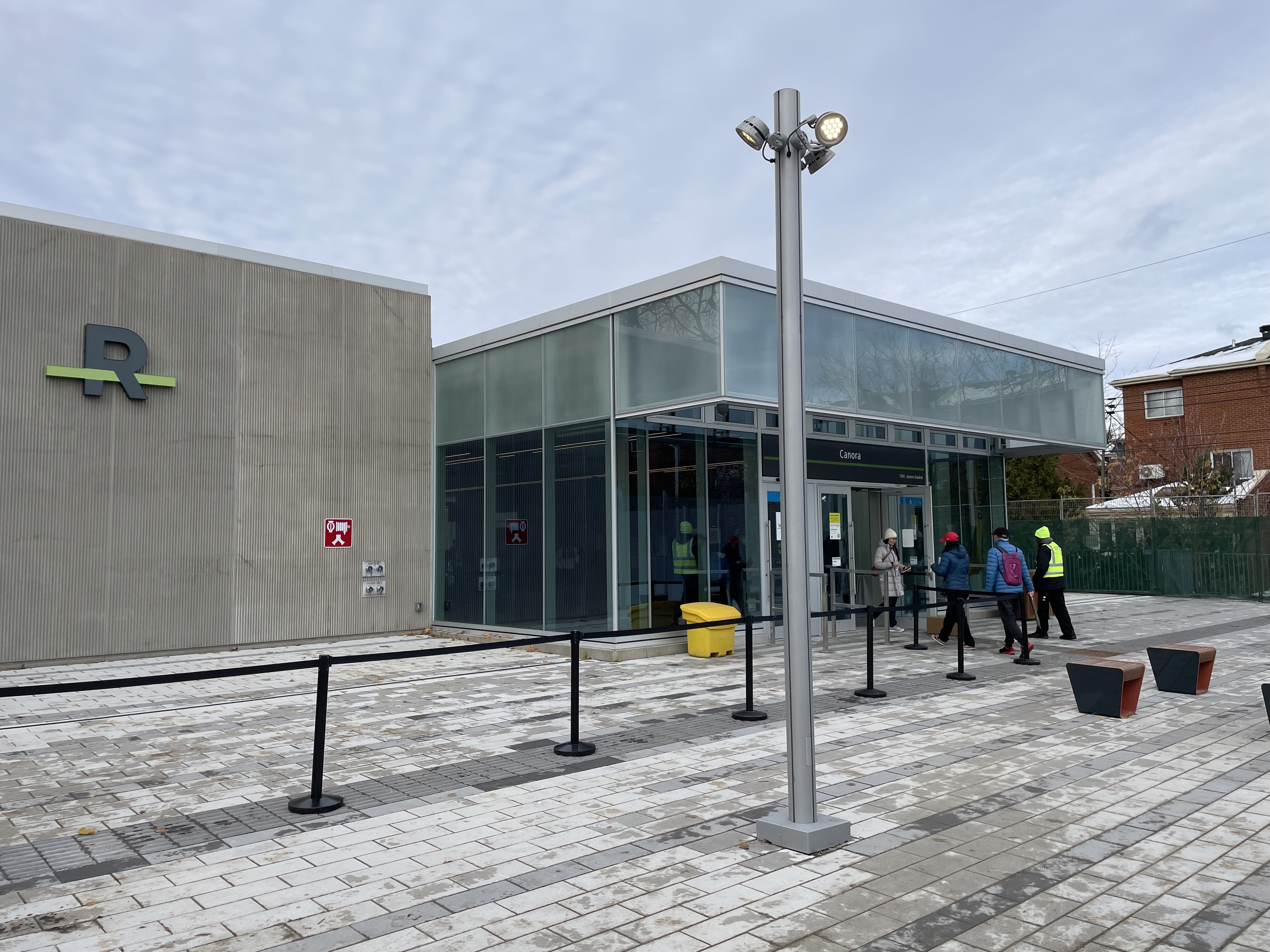
- Station entrance

General information
- Location: 7301 Dunkirk Road; Montreal, Quebec; Canada
- Coordinates: 45°30′50″N 73°38′04″W
- Operator: Pulsar (AtkinsRéalis and Alstom)
- Platforms: 2 side platforms
- Tracks: 2
- Connections: STM bus

Construction
- Structure type: Below-grade
- Cycle facilities: 46 rack spaces
- Accessible: Yes

Other information
- Station code: CAN
- Fare zone: ARTM: A
- Website: rem.info/en/travelling/stations/canora

History
- Opened: 1918
- Closed: May 11, 2020
- Rebuilt: November 17, 2025 (REM)
- Former names: Portal Heights

Passengers
- 2019: 151,500 Deux-Montagnes; 32,700 Mascouche; 184,200 Total (Exo)

Services
Preceding station	REM	Following station
Ville-de-Mont-Royal toward Deux-Montagnes or Anse-à-l'Orme	Réseau express métropolitain	Édouard-Montpetit toward Brossard
Future services
Preceding station	REM	Following station
Ville-de-Mont-Royal toward Airport	Réseau express métropolitain (opens 2027)	Édouard-Montpetit toward Brossard
Former services
Preceding station	Exo	Following station
Mont-Royal toward Deux-Montagnes	Deux-Montagnes	Montreal Terminus
Mont-Royal toward Mascouche	Line 15 – Mascouche	Montreal Terminus
Preceding station	Canadian National Railway	Following station
Services in 1948
Mount Royal toward Rawdon	Montreal – Rawdon; Local stops	Montreal Terminus
Mount Royal toward St. Eustache-sur-le-Lac or Hawkesbury	St. Eustache-sur-le-Lac services	Montreal Terminus
Location

Canora (French pronunciation: [kanɔʁa]) is a station on the Réseau express métropolitain (REM) that opened on November 17, 2025. It is located in the Glenmount neighbourhood of Montreal, Quebec, Canada, just east of the Town of Mount Royal. The platforms are located northwest of the west portal of the Mount Royal Tunnel.

Until May 2020, Canora was a commuter rail station on Exo's Deux-Montagnes and Mascouche lines.

== Facilities ==
The REM line, like the commuter train lines before it, crosses through the Town of Mount Royal in a below-grade cutting, before entering the Mount Royal Tunnel immediately south of Canora station. The station features two enclosed side platforms along the tracks, with platform screen doors. At its south end, a crossover and ticket hall are located at grade, housing the station entrance. This opens onto a terrace over the tracks, giving access to Chemin Dunkirk on the west and Chemin Canora on the east. Two elevators connect the ticket hall and platforms for wheelchair accessibility.

== History ==
The station is located at 7301 Chemin Dunkirk, between Chemin Dunkirk and Chemin Canora immediately north of Jean Talon Street.

From the opening of the Deux-Montagnes Line in 1918 by the Canadian Northern Railway until the modernization of the line, which took place between 1993 and 1995, the station was called Portal Heights because of its location at the northwest end of the Mount Royal Tunnel. At the reopening, the station was renamed after adjacent Canora Road, a portmanteau of Canadian Northern Railway (CaNoRa), in tribute to the line's founder.

Since opening, the station has been valued by the residents of not only the town of Mont-Royal, but also by those of the Côte-des-Neiges borough, for its fast connection with downtown via the tunnel.

Beginning in May 2018, due to its 4-year-long process of being converted to light rapid transit, only one of its two platforms was used for travel in both directions; the same was true for its neighbouring station Mont-Royal. Both stations were closed on May 20, 2019, and were replaced with a single temporary station called Canora—Mont-Royal. That station was closed and the section of the line shut down on May 11, 2020.

The station was originally scheduled to reopen in 2024 as a light metro station in the second phase of the Réseau express métropolitain, then it was later pushed back to November 2025. The REM station opened for regular service on November 17, 2025.

As part of the REM project, a connecting station was projected for the Saint-Jérôme line adjacent to Canora across Rue Jean-Talon. However, no construction has yet been announced.

== Connecting bus routes ==
Société de transport de Montréal
No.	Route	Connects to	Service times / notes
92	Jean-Talon West	De La Savane; Namur; Acadie; Parc; De Castelnau; Jean-Talon	Daily
155	Wilderton	Édouard-Montpetit; Université-de-Montréal; Côte-des-Neiges	Weekdays, peak only
160	Barclay	Beaubien; Plamondon	Daily
372 ☾	Jean-Talon	Saint-Michel; D'Iberville; Fabre; Jean-Talon; De Castelnau; Parc; Acadie; Namur	Night service
TA ♿︎	STM Transport adapté		
