= Mount Royal Tunnel =

Railway tunnel in Montreal, Quebec

Coordinates: 45.5113°N 73.6200°W

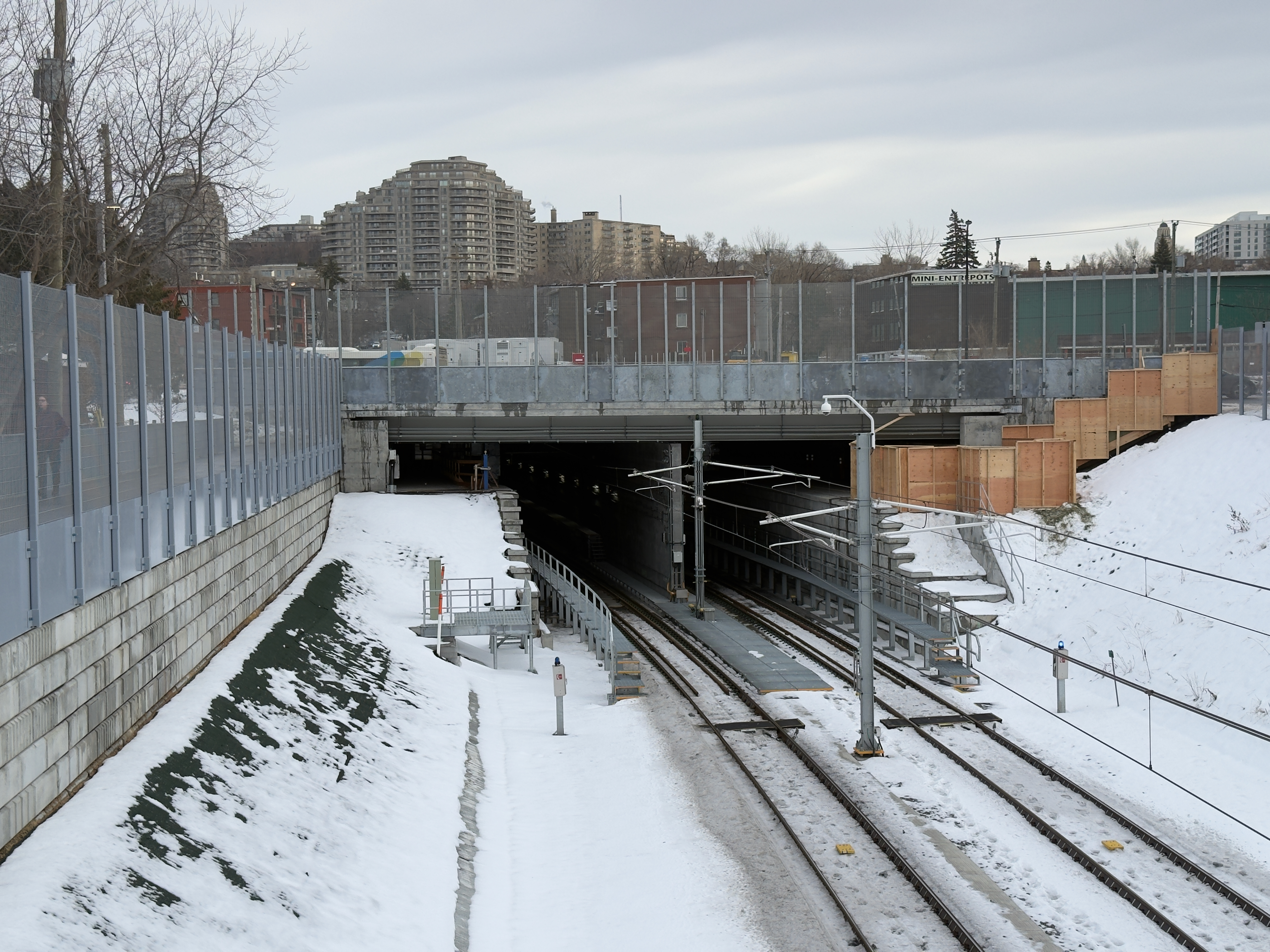
- Northern portal of the Mount Royal Tunnel at Canora station in December 2025.
- Interactive map of Mount Royal Tunnel

Overview
- Line: Réseau express métropolitain (since 2025)
- Location: Montreal, Quebec, Canada
- Crosses: Mount Royal

Operation
- Work began: 1911
- Opened: 1918
- Closed: May 11, 2020
- Reopens: November 17, 2025
- Traffic: Urban rail transit

Technical
- Length: 5.3 km (3.3 mi)
- Track gauge: 1,435 mm (4 ft 8 1/2 in) standard gauge
- Electrified: 2,400 V DC (1918–1980s); 3,000 V DC (1980s–1995); 25 kV 60 Hz AC (1995–2020); 1,500 V DC (2023)
- Tunnel clearance: 4.42 m (14 ft 6 in)

The Mount Royal Tunnel (French: tunnel sous le mont Royal, tunnel du mont Royal) is a railway tunnel in Montreal, Quebec, Canada. The tunnel is the third longest in Canada, after the Mount Macdonald Tunnel and the Connaught Tunnel, and connects the city's Central Station, in Downtown Montreal, with the north side of Montreal Island and Laval and passes through Mount Royal.

The tunnel was originally proposed by the Canadian Northern Railway (CNoR) to provide access to Downtown Montreal without having to cross the already-congested area south of Mount Royal or the route around it to the east. The cost of the tunnel, along with an expansion to the west coast of Canada, caused CNoR to struggle financially before it was nationalized in 1918. Canadian National Railways (CNR), formed from CNoR and several other lines, took over the just-completed tunnel. When CNR also took over the Grand Trunk Railway (GTR) in 1923, access to Ottawa and Toronto along the GTR lines made the tunnel largely redundant, and it was limited mostly to branch lines. The structure gauge of the Mount Royal Tunnel limits the height of bilevel cars to 4.42 metres (14 ft 6 in).

Until 2014, the only trains using the tunnel were commuter trains from Agence metropolitaine de transport's Deux-Montagnes service. From December 2014 to May 2020, it was also used by the Mascouche line, which serves the northeastern part of Montreal Island and the suburbs of Repentigny, Terrebonne, and Mascouche. Exo also considered rerouting its Saint-Jérôme line to Central Station via the tunnel from its current termini at Parc or Lucien L'Allier to save 15 minutes.

On May 11, 2020, the Mount Royal Tunnel closed for a period initially planned to be three years, but reopened in November 2025, more than five years later. The reopening had been delayed due to the discovery of leftover explosives used during the original excavation of the tunnel, greater than expected deterioration at the south end of the tunnel, and various issues caused by the COVID-19 pandemic. As part of the refurbishment providing exclusive use for the Réseau express métropolitain, two new stations were added mid-tunnel.

== History ==
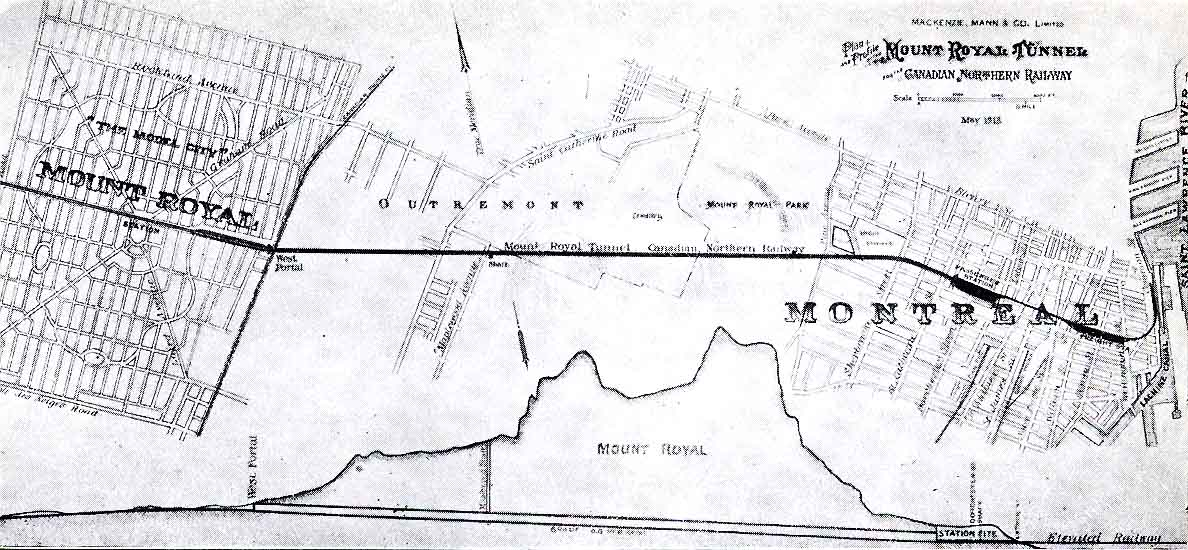
Plan of the Mount Royal Tunnel linking Mount Royal, Quebec (west) to Downtown Montreal (east)

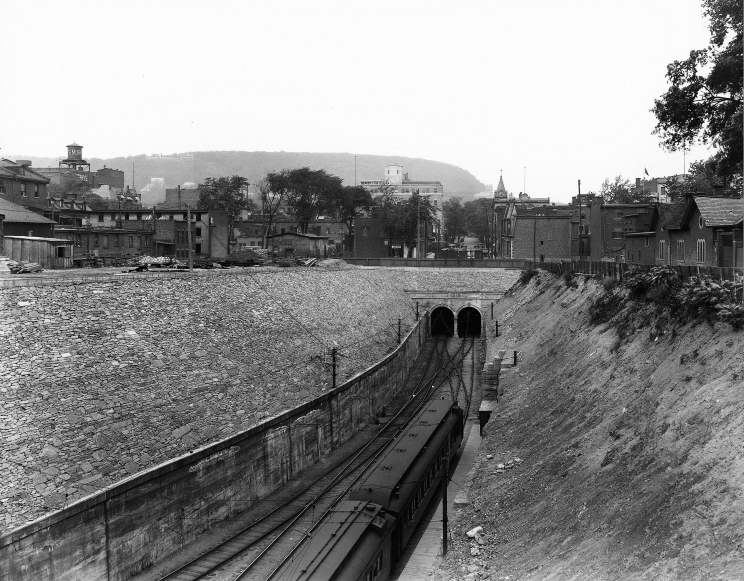
Entry of the Mount Royal tunnel, 1918

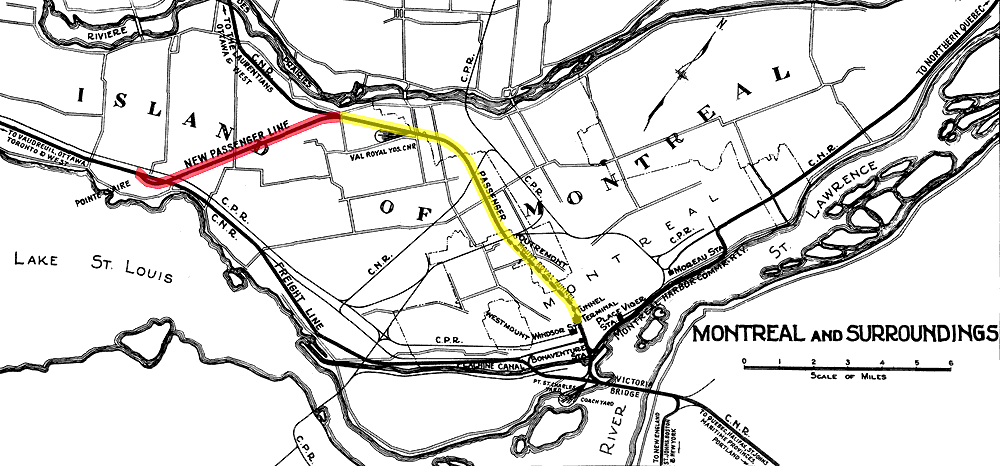
Map of 1927 of the Island of Montreal with the position of the tunnel under Mount Royal shown by dashes on the yellow line; the red line shows a proposed, but never completed, access to Central Station.

The tunnel was conceived in 1910 by the Canadian Northern Railway (CNoR) as a means to give the company access to downtown Montreal. The only easy routes along the south side of Mount Royal had long been taken by rivals Canadian Pacific Railway (CPR) and Grand Trunk Railway (GTR). CNoR wanted to avoid crossing the CPR and GTR lines. Likewise CNoR preferred a direct route as opposed to detouring the railway around the north and east sides of Mount Royal.

To finance the costly tunnel option, CNoR planned to develop the low-valued farmland north of Mount Royal into a model community which was named the Town of Mount Royal. CNoR also planned a downtown terminal and associated office and retail developments for low-priced lands at de la Gauchetière Street and McGill College Avenue. Several farms which grew the Montreal melon were bought by the builders to make way for the tracks: "There were two years of preliminary bargaining, after which currency by the satchel full was paid over to the owners of the farms which made the Montreal melons famous, in the purchase of their land. More than $1,500,000 was paid out in that way, with currency, in the rush of land speculation that followed the announcement of the plan. One farmer was paid $117,000 and another farm brought $781,783."

In 1911, the Canadian Northern Montreal Tunnel and Terminal Company was incorporated to build the tunnel and terminal. It was renamed Mount Royal Tunnel and Terminal Company in 1914, and was a wholly owned subsidiary of CNoR. Construction started at the west portal on July 8, 1912. On December 10, 1913, crews from the east and west portals met beneath Mount Royal; they were out of alignment by 1 inch (2.5 cm). The bore measures approximately 5 kilometres (3.1 mi) and has an ascending grade of 0.6% westbound.

CNoR placed an order with General Electric in 1914 for 6 boxcab electric-powered locomotives for use in the tunnel; they were delivered in 1916–1917. Both the locomotives and the electrification were very similar to those of the Butte, Anaconda and Pacific Railway. Lining of the tunnel bore with concrete was completed by 1916 and the 2 parallel standard gauge tracks and 2400 V DC catenary were installed by September 1918. Progress was slowed by the First World War and CNoR's ongoing financial difficulties by the mid-1910s. The first train, with locomotive 601 leading, ran through the tunnel October 21, 1918. The event was little-noticed due to the still-ongoing war and a ban on large public gatherings due to the Spanish flu epidemic.

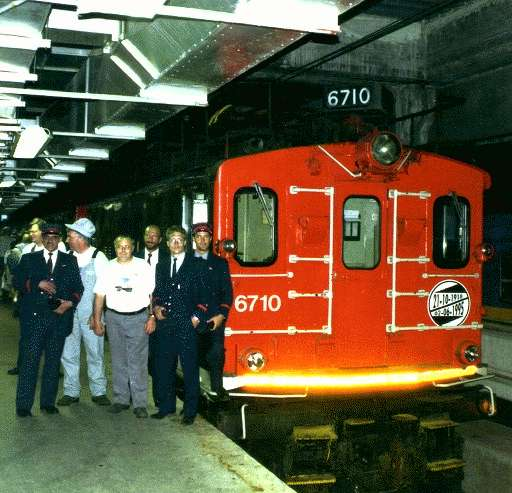
CN Boxcab Electric locomotive used on the Deux-Montagnes suburban train line from 1918 to 1995

On September 6, 1918, the insolvent CNoR was nationalized by the federal government when its board of directors was replaced by a government appointed board of management, implemented by the Department of Railways and Canals. At the same time, the newly appointed board at CNoR was directed to take over the operation of the government-owned Canadian Government Railways (CGR). On December 20, 1918, the Privy Council issued an order creating the Canadian National Railways (CNR) to operate CNoR, CGR and eventually other bankrupt private-sector railways. Ironically, the Grand Trunk became part of CNR in 1923, giving CNR better routes to Ottawa and Toronto and relegating the tunnel line to branch-line status. Nevertheless, it still remains an essential part of Montreal's regional transport system.

CNR took over the Mount Royal Tunnel at the time of its completion, along with the virtually empty lands which CNoR's owners, Sir William Mackenzie and Sir Donald Mann, had envisioned would become a signature real estate development. CNR developed this area sporadically from the 1930s to the 1960s, interrupted by the Great Depression and the Second World War.

A new terminal, begun in 1931, opened as Central Station on July 14, 1943, resulting in the closure of the "temporary" CNoR-era Tunnel Terminal near the same location. Central Station consolidated CNR's passenger terminals in the city and also replaced Bonaventure Station which CNR had inherited from GTR. In the late 1950s, the remainder of the CNoR lands acquired in downtown Montreal during the Mount Royal Tunnel project were developed by CNR. The signature Queen Elizabeth Hotel opened in 1958, followed by the CN (name/acronym change in 1960) headquarters building in 1961 and Place Ville-Marie in 1962.

On July 1, 1982, CN signed a 10-year agreement with STCUM whereby CN operated the line under contract to STCUM's commuter rail service. On February 12, 1992, Quebec's provincial government announced a $289 million modernization of the Mount Royal Tunnel line, including $130 million awarded to Bombardier for 58 new commuter rail cars. Stations, track, electrification and signalling systems were all upgraded, in addition to the tunnel structure itself.

On June 2, 1995, the last of the GE boxcab electric-powered locomotives delivered to CNoR in 1916–1917 for use in the tunnel were retired by CN after nearly 77 years of service. Locomotive 601, which in 1918 pulled the first train into the tunnel, under its final number as Canadian National 6711 pulled the last outbound train; on the return trip it assisted sister 6710. The old rolling stock was replaced by 58 state-of-the-art MR-90 electric multiple units built by Bombardier Transportation.

=== Purchase of the line by AMT ===
On February 28, 2014, the Agence metropolitaine de transport (AMT) purchased the Deux-Montagnes line from CN for $97 million. The agreement gave CN trackage rights for freight trains outside two rush-hour exclusive time windows (08:30–15:30 and 20:30–05:30).

== Recent use ==
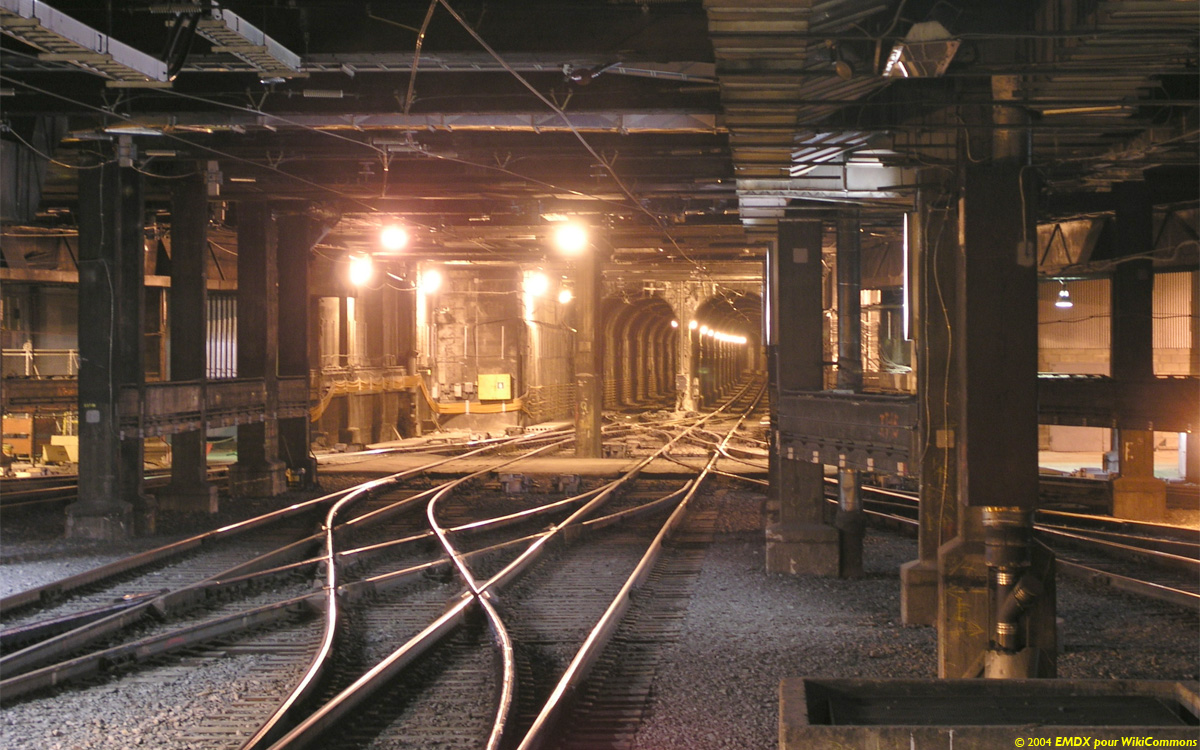
Mount-Royal tunnel's underground eastern portal at Central Station

Until May 2020, commuter trains on Exo's Deux-Montagnes and Mascouche lines used the Mount-Royal Tunnel. Prior to 1995, VIA Rail trains serving Northern Quebec, as well as the former northern route to Quebec City (cancelled in 1990), also used the tunnel; before 1990, these trains were hauled uphill by boxcabs locomotives and coasted downhill. This practice was eliminated in 1995, when the catenary and signalling were replaced. The former catenary operated at 3,000 V DC, having been upgraded from the original 2,400 V DC in the early 1980s, while the current catenary operates at 25 kV AC. The current signalling system is centralized traffic control (CTC). The ventilation shaft is too small to permit the use of diesel-electric locomotives within the tunnel.

=== Double-tracking to Roxboro-Pierrefonds ===
As part of the conversion to the REM light-rail standards, the line between Bois-Franc and Roxboro-Pierrefonds was double-tracked, enabling the REM to significantly increase service frequency. A second track had previously existed from Bois-Franc to slightly beyond Saraguay (approximately halfway between Bois-Franc and Sunnybrooke, near Autoroute 13), but it was not electrified and was used by CN freight trains serving industries along the Doney Spur.

=== Mascouche line ===
On December 1, 2014, the Mascouche line entered passengers service. The line shared tracks with the Deux-Montagnes line until Jonction de l’Est (between the Montpellier and Mont-Royal stations), where it diverged onto the St. Laurent Subdivision en route to Mascouche. Trains were operated using dual-mode ALP-45DP locomotives and initially ran under electric power as far as Ahuntsic station, where they transitioned to diesel operation. Service through the Mount Royal Tunnel ended in May 2020.

=== REM ===
The Réseau express métropolitain (REM) replaced this segment of the Réseau de transport métropolitain, along with the entire Deux-Montagnes line and part of the Mascouche line. In addition, two new stations were constructed within the Mount Royal Tunnel directly beneath existing Montreal Metro stations: Édouard-Montpetit and McGill. The new platforms provide direct connections between the REM and the Metro; however, access at Édouard-Montpetit requires a lengthy elevator journey, making it Canada's deepest transit station at a depth of 72 metres (236 feet).

== See also ==
- Red Line (Montreal Metro), an unrealized rapid transit line which would have used the tunnel
