= Reginald J. P. Dawson Library =

Public library in Quebec, Canada

Coordinates: 45°30′50″N 73°38′47″W

The Reginald J. P. Dawson Library (French: Bibliothèque Reginald-J.-P.-Dawson) is the public library of Mount Royal, Quebec, Canada. It was founded in 1952 and moved to its current facility at 1967 Graham Boulevard in 1967. In 1976 it was named after the mayor of the town, Reginald J.P. Dawson, who was in office from 1951 to 1987. The building was expanded in 2012–2013 from 1,700 to 3,100 square metres using plans by architect Pierre Morency. The library was computerized in 1998.

== Art at the library ==
In 2015, the library received its first work of public art, a marble piece by local sculptor Peter Monk entitled Harmony. In 2016 another work was donated by another local sculptor, Megerditch Tarakdjian, a 1.85-metre bronze entitled The Reader. Each month, different artists, residents of Town of Mount-Royal, are featured on the library's Art Wall and in the exhibition hall.
