= Ahuntsic station (Exo) =

Railway station in Montreal, Quebec, Canada

Ahuntsic
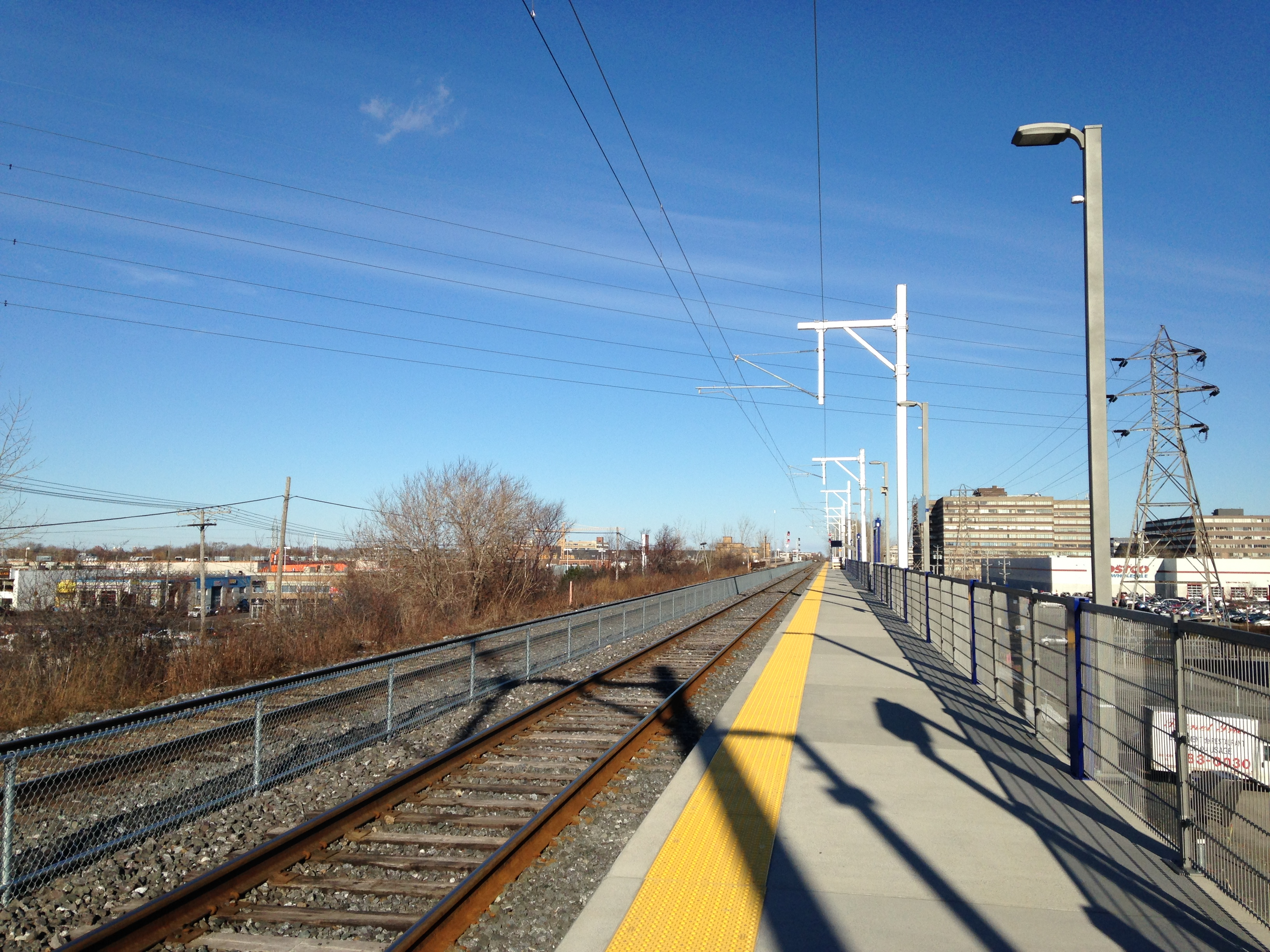

General information
- Location: 9615 L'Acadie Boulevard; Montreal, Quebec, Canada
- Coordinates: 45°32′07″N 73°39′45″W
- Operator: Exo
- Platforms: 2 side platforms (1 in active use, 1 emergency platform)
- Tracks: 2
- Connections: STM bus

Construction
- Parking: None
- Cycle facilities: 14 spaces
- Accessible: Yes

Other information
- Fare zone: ARTM: A
- Website: Ahuntsic station (Exo)

History
- Opened: December 1, 2014; 11 years ago

Passengers
- 2019: 83,800 (Exo)

Services
Preceding station	Exo	Following station
Sauvé toward Mascouche	Line 15 – Mascouche	Côte-de-Liesse Terminus
Former services
Preceding station	Exo	Following station
Before 2020
Sauvé toward Mascouche	Line 15 – Mascouche	Mont-Royal toward Montreal
Before 2026
Sauvé toward Mascouche	Line 15 – Mascouche	Terminus
Sauvé toward Mascouche	Line 15 – Mascouche Limited service	Montreal Terminus
Location

Ahunstic station is a commuter rail station operated by Exo in the borough of Ahuntsic-Cartierville, in Montreal, Quebec, Canada. It is served by the Mascouche line.

== Overview ==
The station is located just north of Marché Central. It was built on an existing CN railroad bridge over Boulevard de l'Acadie, which also underwent partial reconstruction and structural reinforcement. Although it is located relatively close to Chabanel station on the Saint-Jérôme line, they are not considered a transfer site.

Two tracks pass through the station, but only the southern track is used by passengers, with a single low-level side platform. The platform is wheelchair accessible and features a raised wheelchair platform with a ramp to provide access to the trains. A shorter emergency exit platform is located on the north side.

The station has one headhouse, located on the northeastern side of Boulevard de l'Acadie. It provides stair and elevator access from the street. Across Boulevard de l'Acadie is a secondary access with exterior stairs

Two untitled murals by Sylvain Bouthillette are located outside the headhouse.

Until 2020, the station marked the transition between the electrified and non-electrified portions of the Mascouche line. Exo's ALP-45DP dual-mode electro-diesel locomotives transitioned from electric to diesel mode as they continued north along the line.

Between May 2020 and January 2026, most trips on the Mascouche line terminated at Ahuntsic due to the ongoing conversion of the Deux-Montagnes line into the mainline of the Réseau express métropolitain (REM) rapid transit system. On January 12, 2026, a new station called Côte-de-Liesse opened, expressly designed to ensure smooth transfer of users between the Mascouche line and the REM, and replacing Ahuntsic station as the line's new terminus.

== Connecting bus routes ==
Société de transport de Montréal
No.	Route	Connects to	Service times / notes
20	Crémazie / Marché Central	Crémazie; Chabanel	Daily
54	Charland / Chabanel	Crémazie; Chabanel; Côte-de-Liesse	Daily
121	Sauvé / Côte-Vertu	Côte-Vertu; Montpellier; Sauvé	Daily
179	De l'Acadie	Acadie	Daily
365 ☾	Du Parc	Place-d'Armes; Place-des-Arts; Parc; Acadie	Night service
