= Glenmount, Montreal =

Glenmount
- Neighbourhood
- Location of the Glenmount in Montreal
- Coordinates: 45.508659°N 73.638491°W
- Country: Canada
- Province: Quebec
- City: Montreal
- Borough: Côte-des-Neiges–Notre-Dame-de-Grâce

Area
  - Land: 0.3 km^{2} (0.12 sq mi)

Population
  - Total: 1,300
  - Density: 4,283.4/km^{2} (11,094/sq mi)
- Postal Code: H3P, H3R
- Area codes: 514, 438

Glenmount (previously known as Mount Enterprises) is a small residential neighbourhood located in the borough of Côte-des-Neiges–Notre-Dame-de-Grâce in the city of Montreal. Glenmount is bordered by the Town of Mount Royal (TMR) to the north, east and west, and by Côte-des-Neiges, marked by Jean-Talon Boulevard and the Canadian Pacific railway tracks to its south. There are about 1,300 people who live in the 75 acre neighbourhood.

== History ==
Originally a part of the Town of Mount Royal when it was founded in 1912, the area today known as Glenmount, would later split and merge into the city of Montreal. Named Mount Enterprises in 1946, the neighbourhood was renamed Glenmount in 1951 after Baron Strathcona of Glencoe and Mount Royal.

In 1985, the Quebec government rejected an effort by 1600 Glenmount homeowners to join TMR, on the basis that the city of Montreal would not be adequately compensated.

From 2002 to 2005, Glenmount was briefly a part of the former borough of Mount Royal, until the rest of the borough demerged, and Glenmount joined Côte-des-Neiges–Notre-Dame-de-Grâce.

== Merger proposal with TMR ==
According to the Glemount Community Association, 98% of citizens in the neighbourhood would prefer to be part of the Town of Mount Royal rather than the city of Montreal. Citizens in the area claim to be physically isolated from the rest of their Montreal borough, due to the border created by Jean-Talon Boulevard and the CP Rail tracks. They believe that their inclusion in the city of Montreal was an error, and they claim to participate in community life to a greater extent with their Town of Mount Royal neighbours.

== Points of interest ==
- Canora commuter rail station of the Réseau de transport métropolitain.
