= Université-de-Montréal station =

Montreal Metro station

Université-de-Montréal
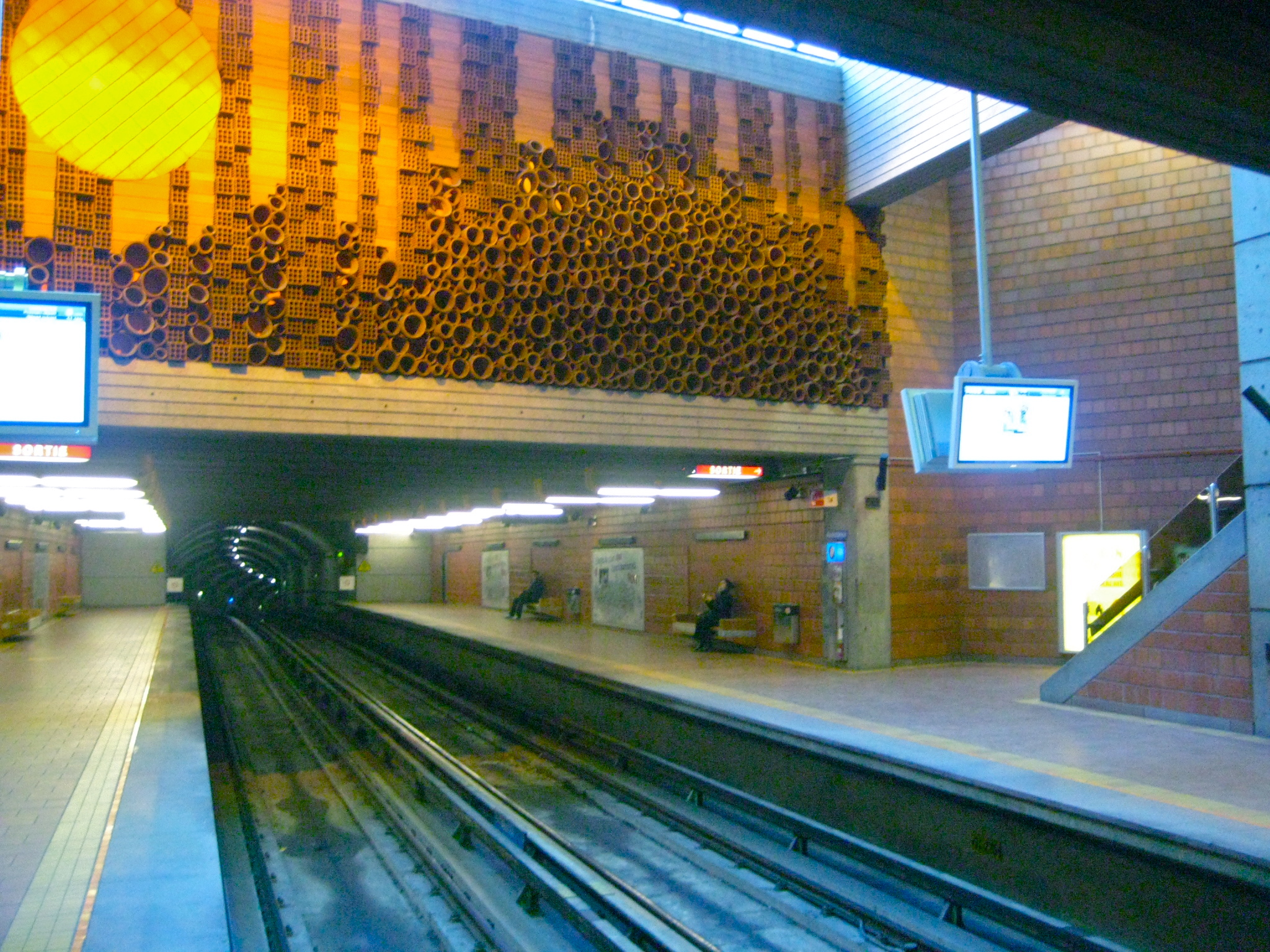

General information
- Location: 2830, boul. Édouard-Monpetit and 5400, av. Louis-Colin; Montreal, Quebec H3T 1L5; Canada
- Coordinates: 45°30′12″N 73°37′03″W
- Operator: Société de transport de Montréal
- Platforms: 2 side platforms
- Tracks: 2
- Connections: STM bus

Construction
- Depth: 5.4 metres (17 feet 9 inches), 58th deepest
- Accessible: No
- Architect: André Léonard

Other information
- Fare zone: ARTM: A

History
- Opened: 4 January 1988

Passengers
- 2024: 2,522,648 ▲10.84%
- Rank: 46 of 68

Services
| Preceding station | Montreal Metro | Following station |
|---|---|---|
| Côte-des-Neiges toward Snowdon | Blue Line | Édouard-Montpetit toward Saint-Michel |
Location

Université-de-Montréal station (French pronunciation: [ynivɛʁsite də mɔ̃ʁeal]) is a Montreal Metro station in the borough of Côte-des-Neiges–Notre-Dame-de-Grâce of Montreal, Quebec, Canada. It is operated by the Société de transport de Montréal (STM) and serves the Blue Line. It is located in the Côte-des-Neiges neighbourhood.

== Overview ==
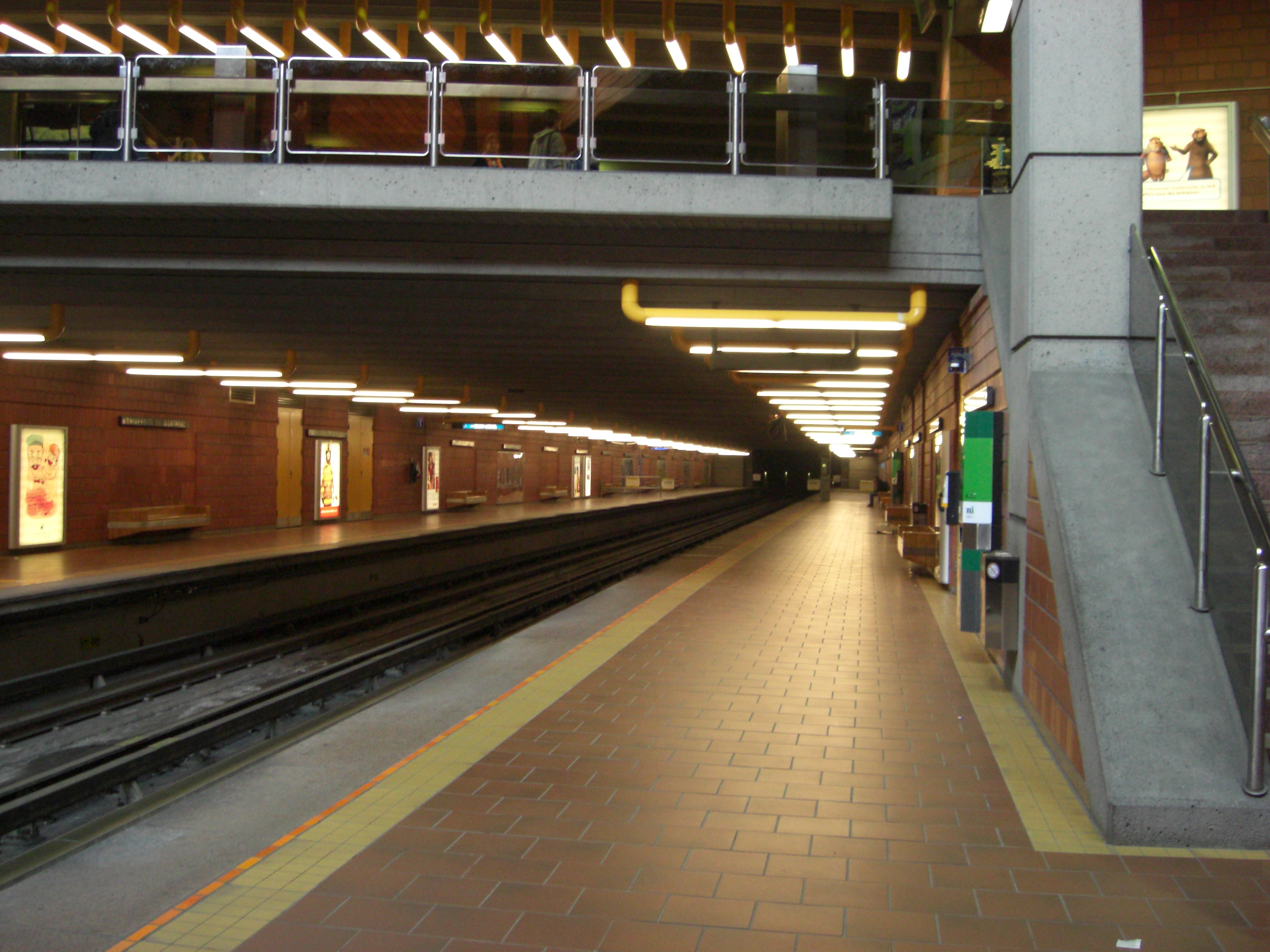

It is a normal side platform station. Constructed in the side of Mount Royal, it is the network's highest station in elevation.

It has three entrances. The main entrance, facing boul. Édouard-Montpetit, and the Université de Montréal entrance adjacent to the entrance of La Rampe escalator tunnel leading to the university's main pavilion, open directly onto the ticket hall. A third entrance on av. Louis-Colin is connected by a walkway leading over the platforms through the station cavern.

The station contains two works of art in terra cotta by architect André Léonard. The larger, located above the ticket hall, is entitled Les quatre éléments; the smaller is located at the end of the walkway to the Louis-Colin entrance.

The station is equipped with the MétroVision information screens which displays news, commercials, and the time till the next train.

== Origin of name ==
The station derives its name from the Université de Montréal under the campus of which it lies.

== Connecting bus routes ==
Société de transport de Montréal
| No. | Route | Connects to | Service times / notes |
|---|---|---|---|
| 51 | Édouard-Montpetit | Laurier; Édouard-Montpetit; Snowdon; Montréal-Ouest | Daily Some rush hour services start and end at Snowdon metro |
| 155 | Wilderton | Canora; Édouard-Montpetit; Côte-des-Neiges | Weekdays, peak only |
| 368 ☾ | Avenue-Du-Mont-Royal | Frontenac; Édouard-Montpetit; Côte-Sainte-Catherine; Plamondon; Namur; De La Savane; Côte-Vertu | Night service |

== Nearby points of interest ==
- Université de Montréal
  - École Polytechnique de Montréal
  - École des Hautes Études Commerciales de Montréal
- Collège Jean-de-Brébeuf
- Hôpital Sainte-Justine
