= De la Savane station =

Montreal Metro station

De la Savane
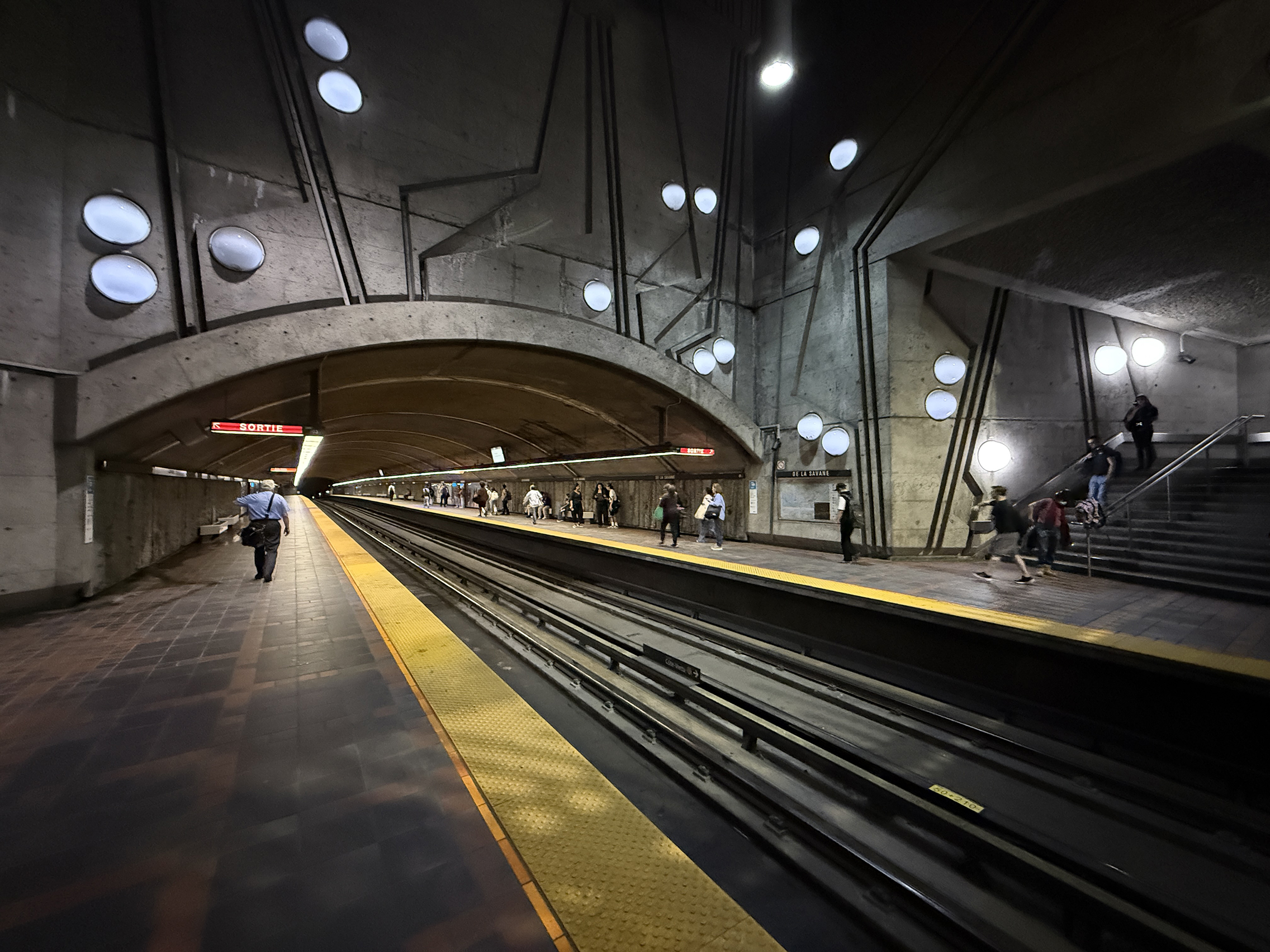

General information
- Location: 8261, Decarie Boulevard; Montreal, Quebec H4P 2H7; Canada
- Coordinates: 45°30′01″N 73°39′42″W
- Operator: Société de transport de Montréal
- Platforms: 2 side platforms
- Tracks: 2
- Connections: STM bus

Construction
- Depth: 19.4 metres (63 feet 8 inches), 15th deepest
- Accessible: No
- Architect: Guy de Varennes & Almas Mathieu

Other information
- Fare zone: ARTM: A

History
- Opened: 9 January 1984

Passengers
- 2024: 1,596,015 ▲33.84%
- Rank: 61 of 68

Services
Preceding station	Montreal Metro	Following station
Du Collège toward Côte-Vertu	Orange Line	Namur toward Montmorency
Location

De la Savane station (French pronunciation: [də la savan]) is a Montreal Metro station in the borough of Côte-des-Neiges–Notre-Dame-de-Grâce in Montreal, Quebec, Canada. It is operated by the Société de transport de Montréal (STM) and serves the Orange Line. It is located in the Côte-des-Neiges area on the border of the town of Mount Royal. It opened on January 9, 1984.

== Overview ==
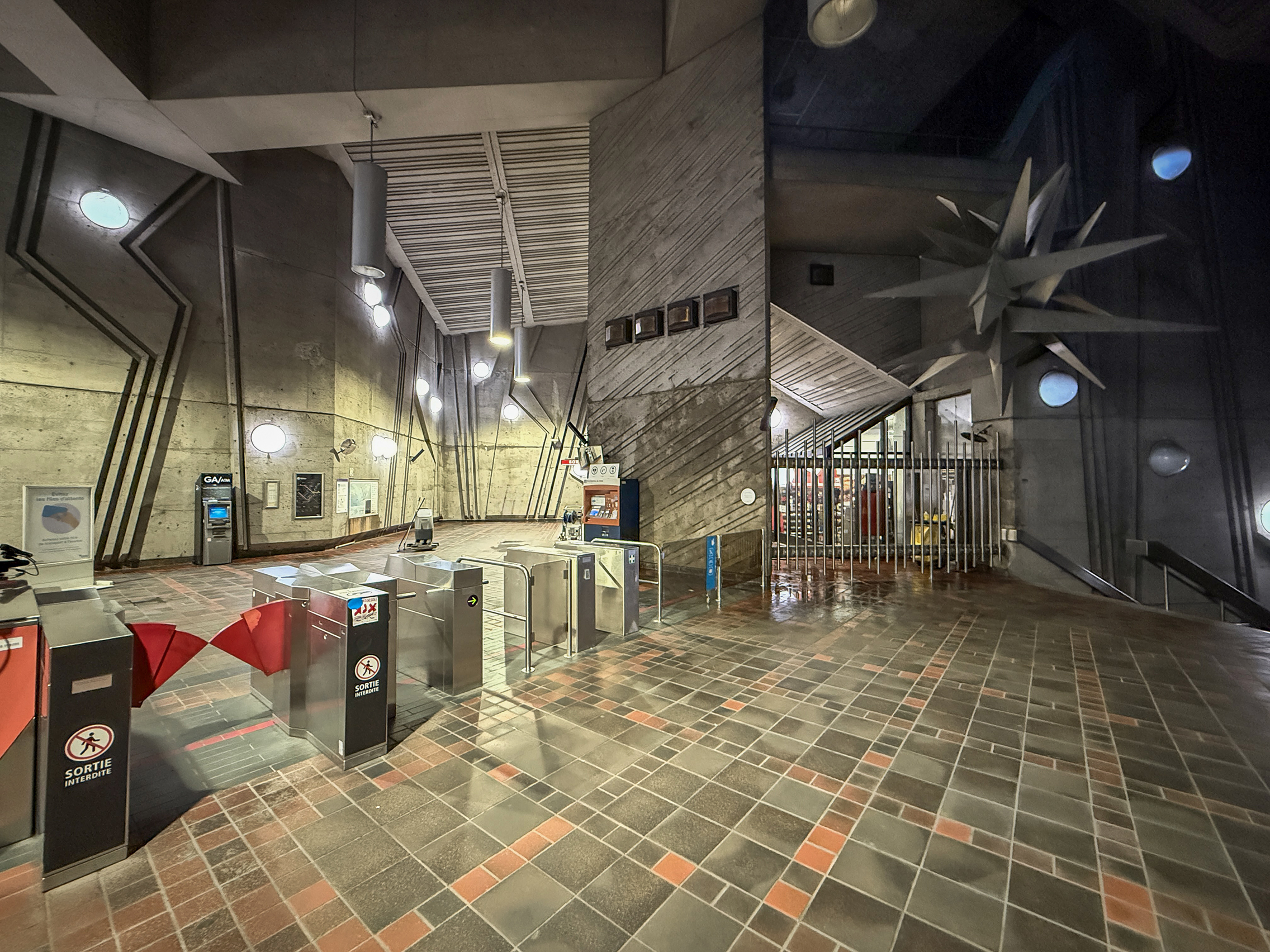
Station concourse

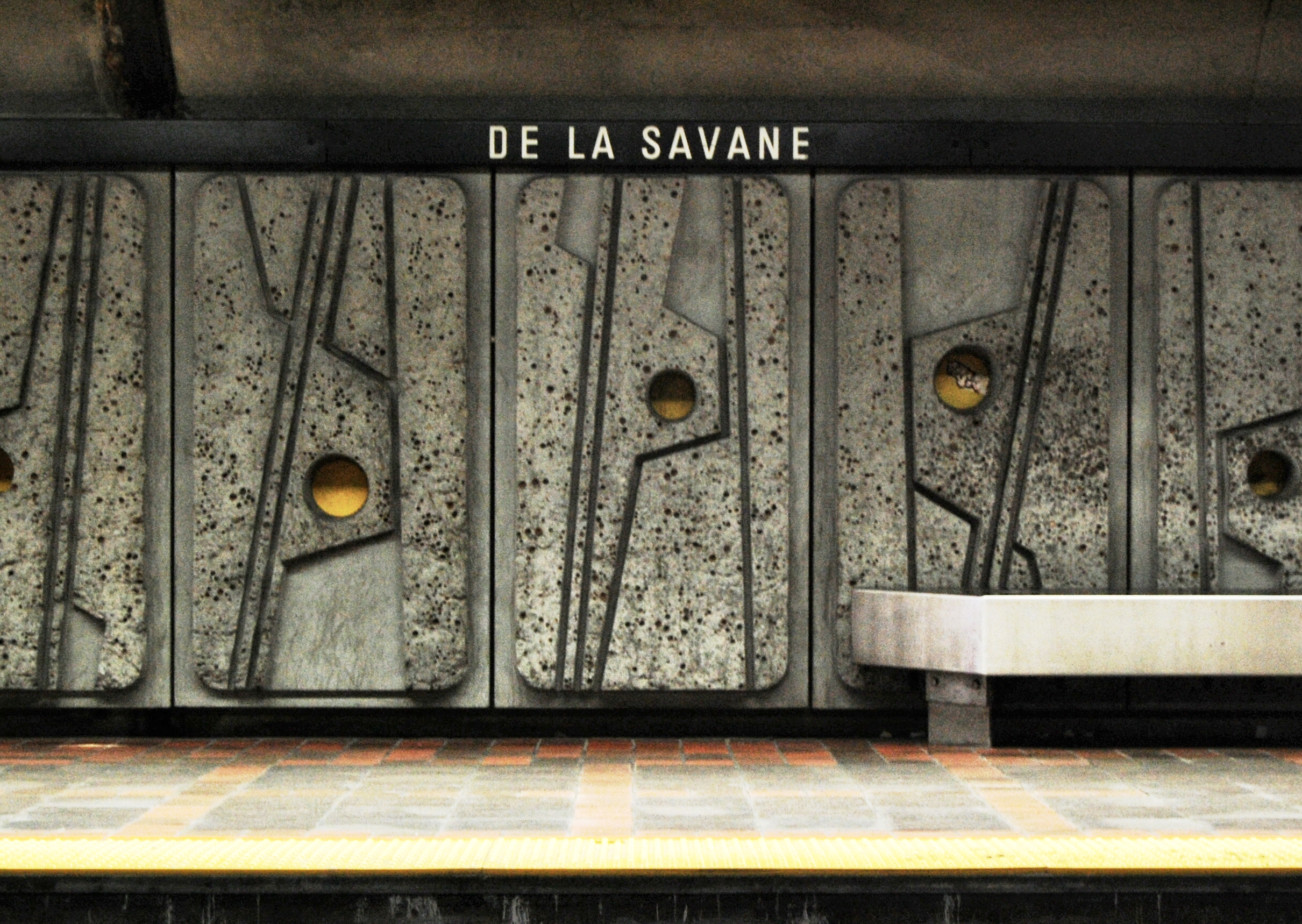
Station platform wall artwork

The station is a normal side platform station with an entrance at the north end. It was planned in such a way as to allow an additional entrance to be built on the other side of the Décarie Autoroute, but this has not yet happened. As it is the station with the fewest passengers (as of 2002), a redevelopment plan for the area is under discussion.

The station was designed by Maurice Houle (interior architect), Guy de Varennes and Almas Mathieu. Its artworks include mural treatments in the entrance, mezzanine, and platforms by the architects, as well as a large metal sculpture by Maurice Lemieux, entitled Calcite, affixed to the wall of the mezzanine and illuminated by a light shaft.

== Origin of the name ==
This station is named for the nearby rue de la Savane, a connector street between the Decarie expressway and Jean Talon Street.

== Connecting bus routes ==
Société de transport de Montréal
No.	Route	Connects to	Service times / notes
17	Décarie	Place-Saint-Henri; Vendôme; Snowdon; Namur; Du Collège; Côte-Vertu	Daily
92	Jean-Talon West	Namur; Canora; Acadie; Parc; De Castelnau; Jean-Talon	Daily
100	Crémazie	Crémazie; Du Collège (westbound only)	Daily Eastbound only
120	Royalmount	Namur	Weekdays, peak only
368 ☾	Avenue-Du-Mont-Royal	Frontenac; Édouard-Montpetit; Université-de-Montréal; Côte-Sainte-Catherine; Plamondon; Namur; Côte-Vertu	Night service
371 ☾	Décarie	Côte-Vertu; Du Collège; Namur; Snowdon; Place-Saint-Henri; Lionel-Groulx; Atwater	Night service
382 ☾	Pierrefonds / Saint-Charles	Namur; Du Collège; Côte-Vertu; Bois-Franc; Sunnybrooke; Pierrefonds-Roxboro; Beaconsfield	Night service
460	Express Métropolitaine	Crémazie; Du Collège (westbound); Dorval	Weekdays only, eastbound only Certain trips start or end at Montréal-Trudeau International Airport

== Nearby points of interest ==
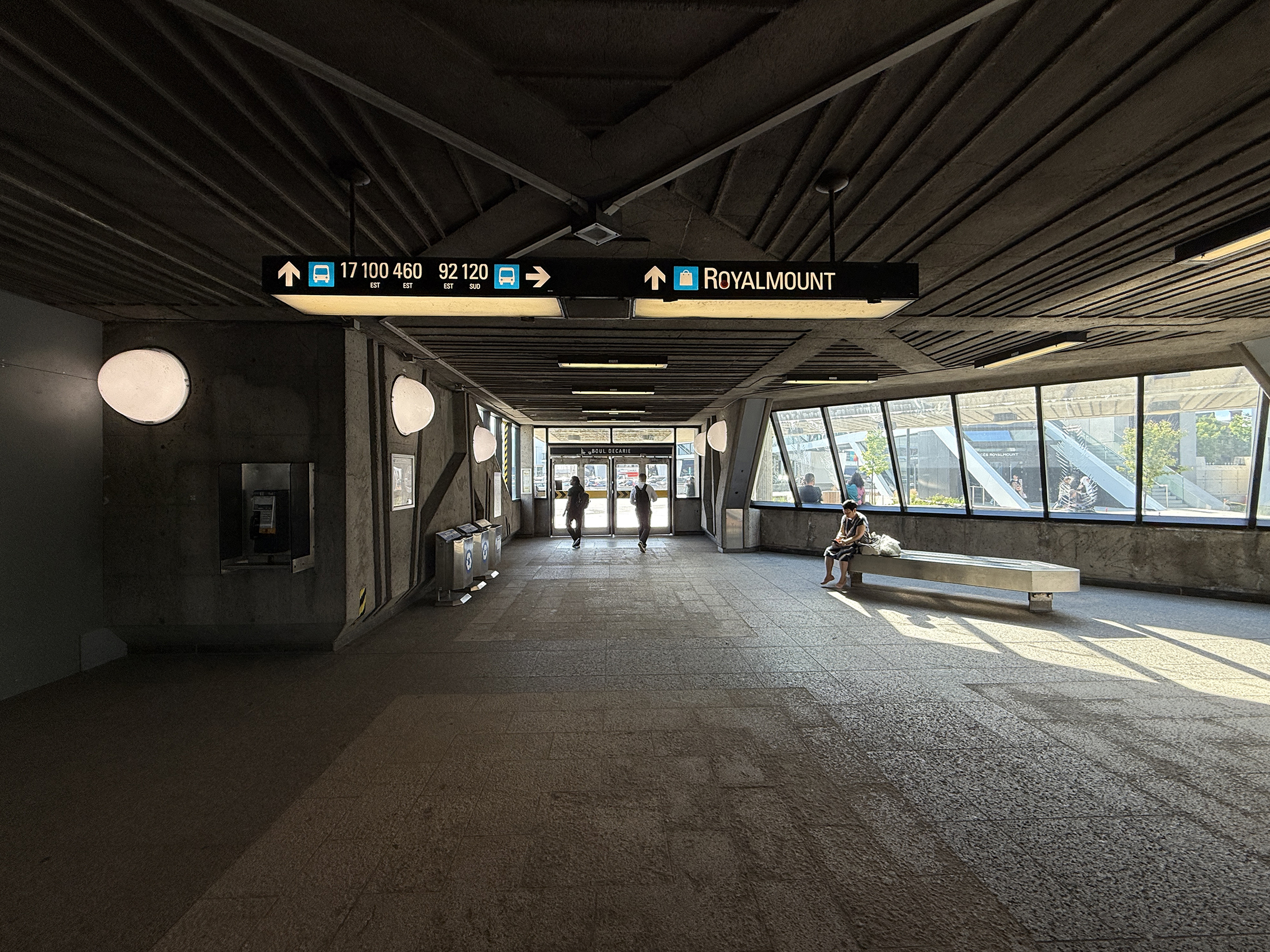
Ground level concourse

- Décarie Autoroute
- Metropolitan Autoroute
- Baron de Hirsch Jewish Cemetery
- Centre commercial VMR
- Centre d'emploi du Canada
- Royalmount
