= Édouard-Montpetit station =

Montreal Metro and Réseau express métropolitain station

Édouard-Montpetit
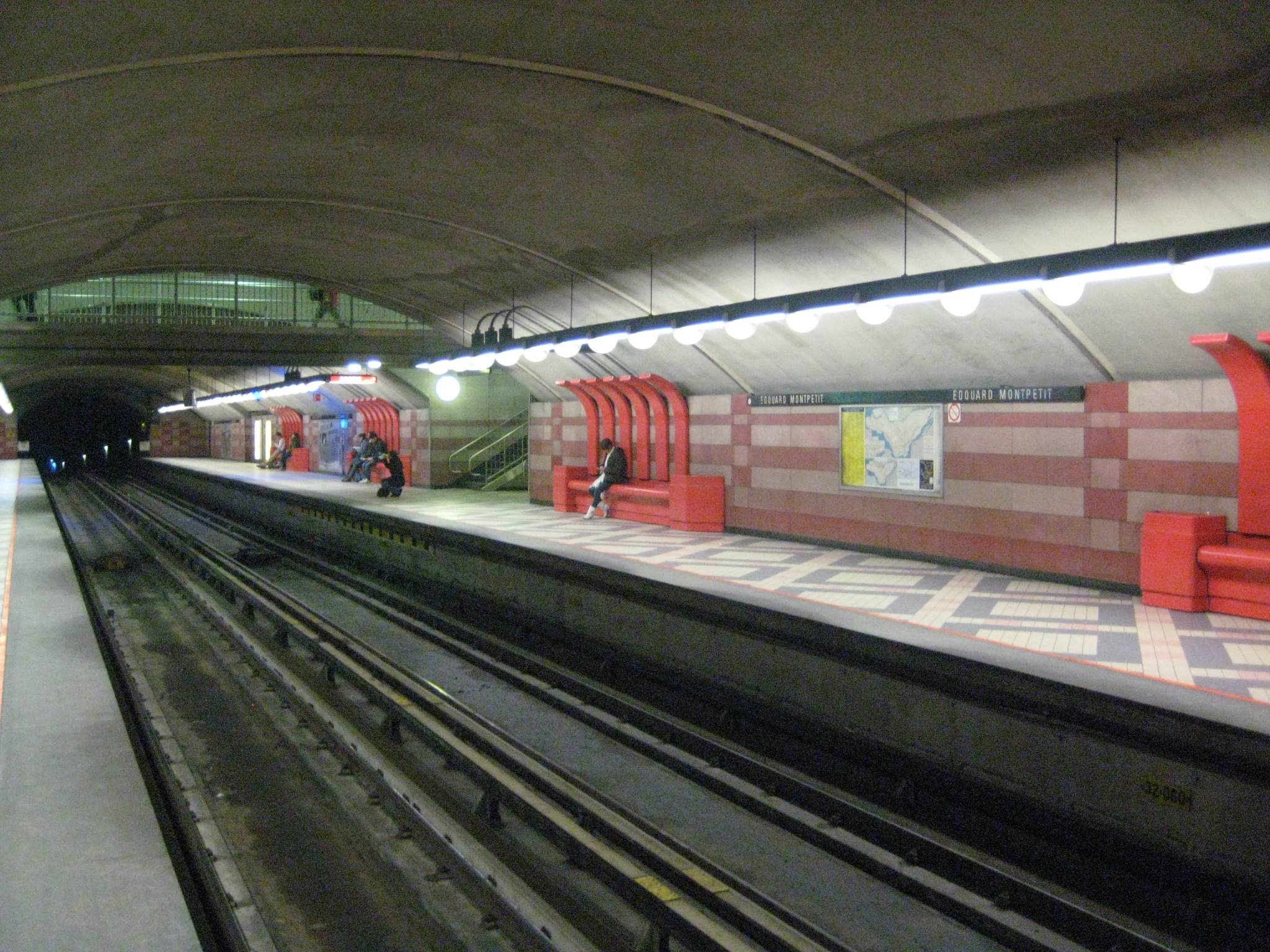
- Metro platforms in the Metro station

General information
- Location: 2040 Édouard-Montpetit Boulevard; 5450 Vincent d’Indy Avenue; Montreal, Quebec; Canada
- Coordinates: 45°30′36″N 73°36′45″W
- Operator: Metro: Société de transport de Montréal; REM: Pulsar (AtkinsRéalis and Alstom)
- Platforms: Metro: 2 side platforms; REM: 2 side platforms
- Tracks: Metro: 2; REM: 2
- Connections: STM bus

Construction
- Depth: Metro: 16.6 metres (54 feet 6 inches), 26th deepest; REM: 72 metres (236 feet), deepest
- Accessible: Yes
- Architect: Metro: Patrice Gauthier

Other information
- Station code: REM: EDM
- Fare zone: ARTM: A
- Website: Metro: stm.info/en/info/networks/metro/edouard-montpetit; REM: rem.info/en/travelling/stations/edouard-montpetit

History
- Opened: 4 January 1988

Key dates
- 2025: REM station opened

Passengers
- 2024: 1,426,581 ▲14.99%
- Rank: 58 of 68

Services
Preceding station	Montreal Metro	Following station
Université-de-Montréal toward Snowdon	Blue Line	Outremont toward Saint-Michel
Preceding station	REM	Following station
Canora toward Deux-Montagnes or Anse-à-l'Orme	Réseau express métropolitain	McGill toward Brossard
Future services
Preceding station	REM	Following station
Canora toward Airport	Réseau express métropolitain (opens 2027)	McGill toward Brossard
Location

Édouard-Montpetit station (French pronunciation: [edwaʁ mɔ̃pəti]) is a Montreal Metro and Réseau express métropolitain (REM) station in Montreal, Quebec, Canada. The Metro station is operated by the Société de transport de Montréal (STM) and is served by the Blue Line. The REM station is operated by Pulsar, and is served by all REM branches.

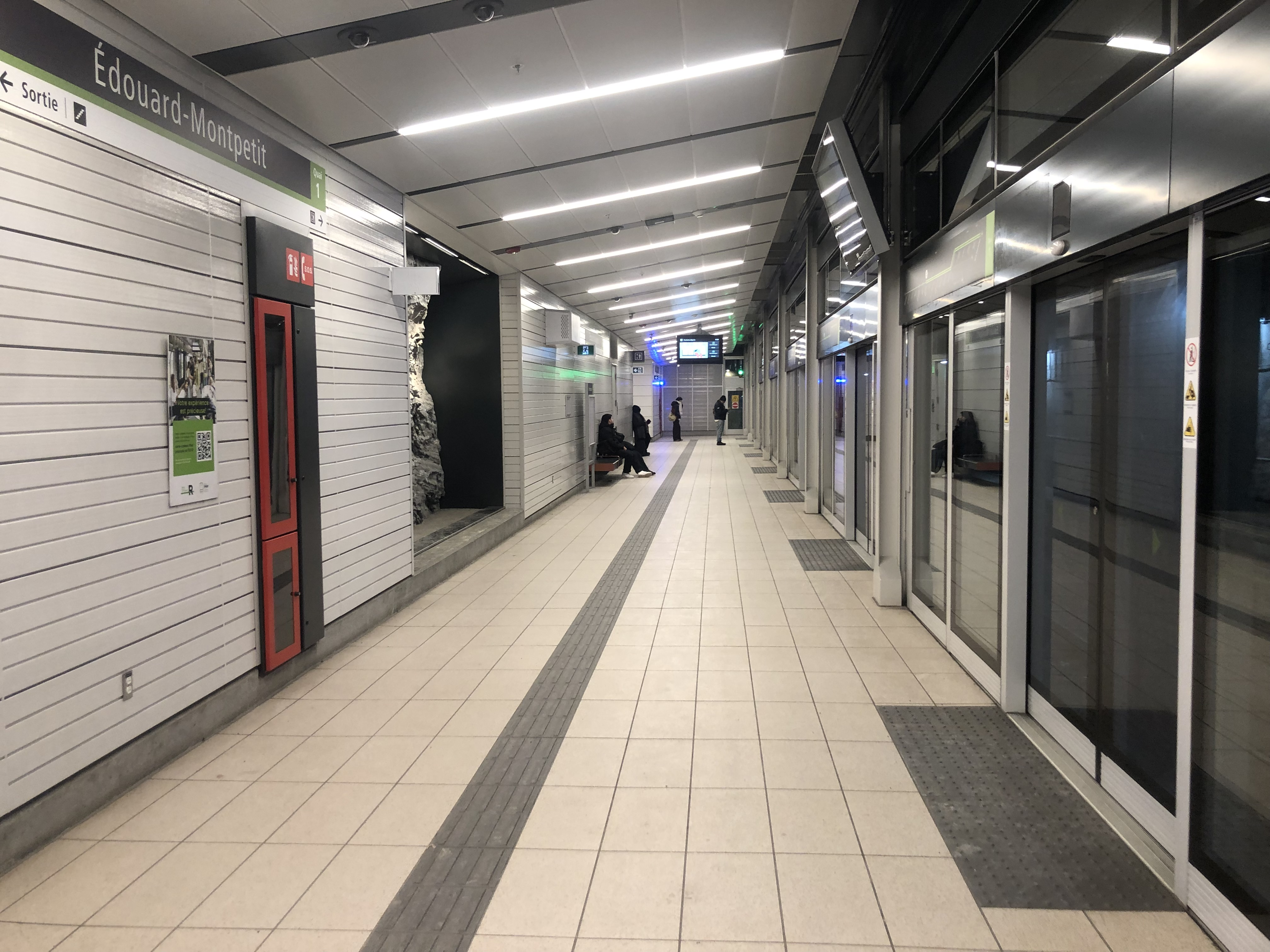
The northbound REM station platform

The Metro station opened in January 1988, and the REM station opened in November 2025. The REM station is the second-deepest in North America, located around 20 storeys or 72 metres (236 feet) below ground.

The station is located in the Côte-des-Neiges area of the borough of Côte-des-Neiges–Notre-Dame-de-Grâce near the borough of Outremont.

== History ==
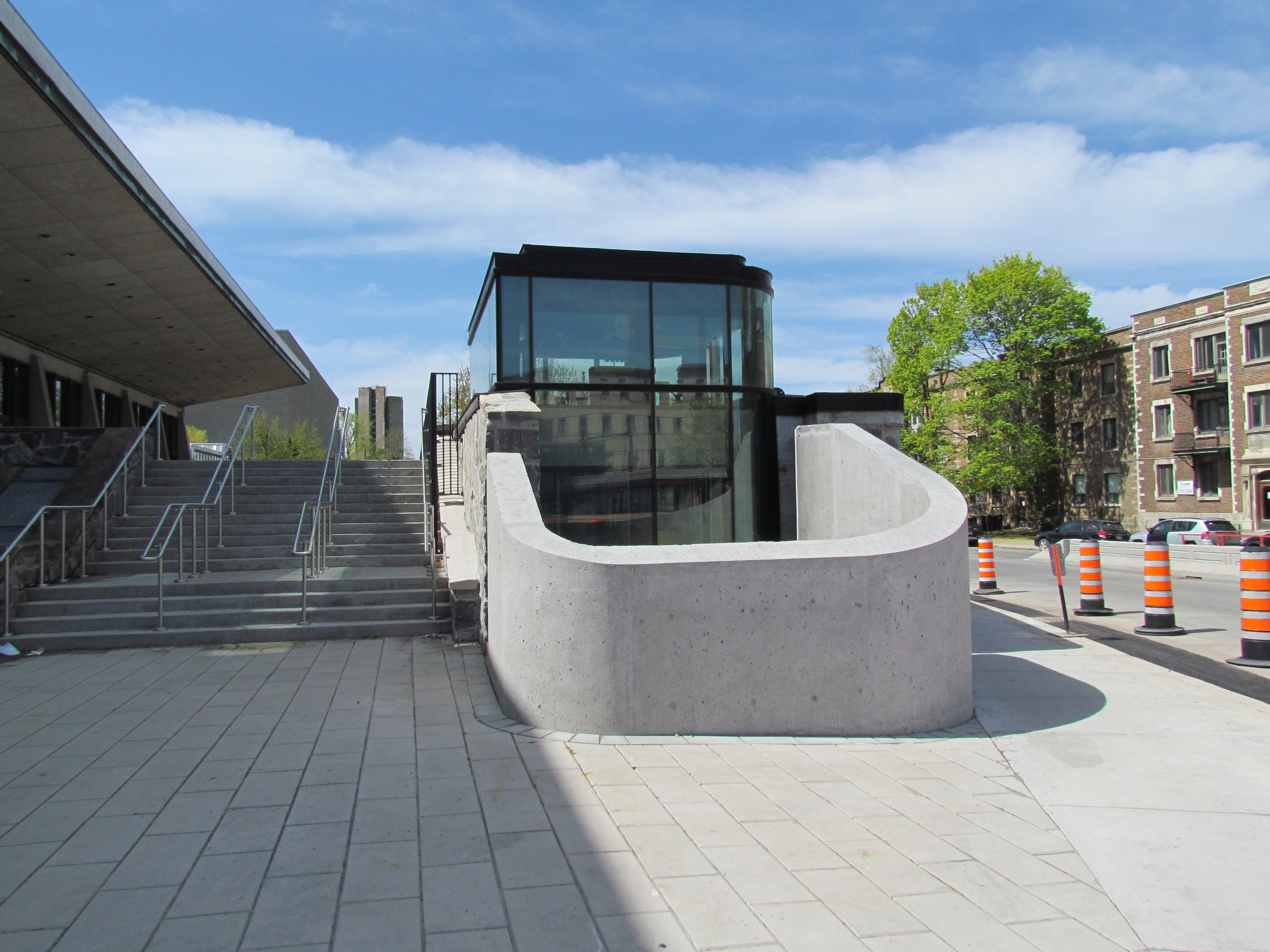
Outside view of the metro surface elevator

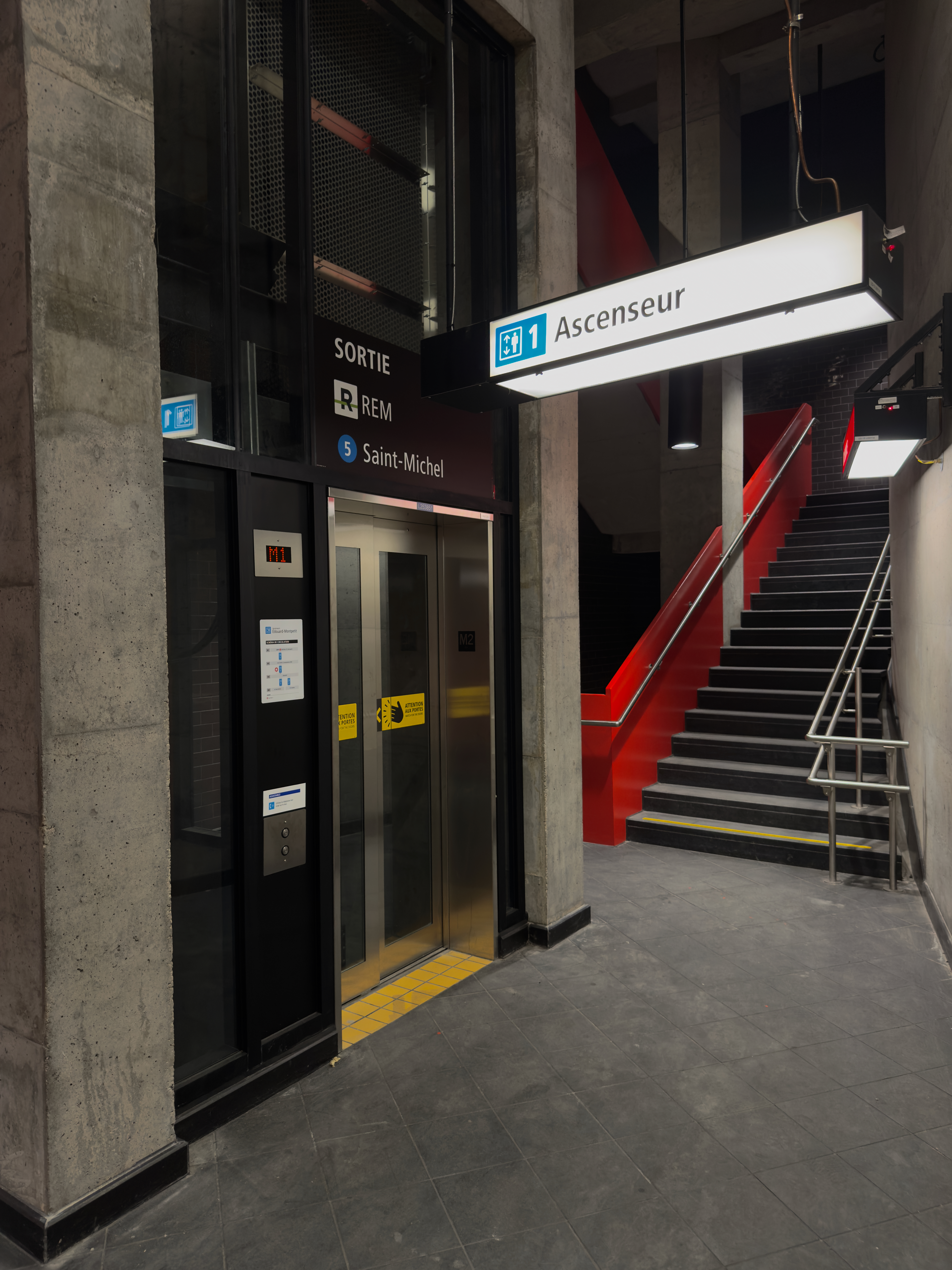
Intermediate elevator landing, with new staircase in the background

The Metro station was opened in January 1988 as part of the extension of the Blue Line to Snowdon.

In 2020, work began to install elevators to serve the Blue line platforms, allowing an accessible interchange between the REM and the Blue line. This was originally planned for completion in late 2022. Elevators became operational on March 31, 2026, becoming the 31st accessible station in the network.

=== Réseau express métropolitain station ===
In November 2016, CDPQ Infra announced that the proposed Réseau express métropolitain (REM) system would connect to the Blue line at Édouard-Montpetit. As with the 1980s Line 3 proposal, the REM uses the historic Mont Royal tunnel to head north from downtown.

The new station is located around 20 storeys or 72 metres (236 feet) below ground, making it the deepest station in Canada and the second deepest in North America after Portland's Washington Park station. For comparison, the Blue line is around 12 metres (39 feet) below ground at this location. Five high-speed elevators connect the REM platforms to the Blue Line station and the surface.

Construction on the Édouard-Montpetit REM station began in July 2018. Blasting to expand the Mont Royal tunnel to accommodate new platforms, passageways and utility rooms began in October 2018 and lasted around a year. The REM station opened on 17 November 2025. The REM station is equipped with high-speed elevators that allow commuters to move the equivalent of 20 floors in approximately 20 seconds while entering or exiting the station. These elevators at the Édouard-Montpetit REM station are the first of their kind in Montreal.

== Overview ==
The metro station was designed by Patrice Gauthier. The design of the station was constrained by a ventilation shaft for the Mont Royal Tunnel, as well as an underground aqueduct. It is a normal side platform station.

The station was designed to be able to provide a connection with the then–Agence métropolitaine de transport's Montreal—Deux Montagnes commuter rail line, which during the planning of the original network was to have been converted into Line 3 of the Metro. This proposal was not carried out; instead, the Réseau express métropolitain (REM) now takes the place of the first two proposals. There is an underground tunnel between the metro station and the CEPSUM complex.

=== Artwork ===
The Blue line station does not have artwork; however, colourful benches and flooring were designed by architect Patrice Gauthier. The REM station has artwork installed in the mezzanine corridor, consisting of eight mosaic panels by artist Manuel Mathieu.

== Origin of name ==
During planning, the station was to be named Vincent-d'Indy, but the name was ultimately changed to Édouard-Montpetit, from the street under which it lies: Édouard-Montpetit Boulevard. The boulevard in turn takes its name from Édouard Montpetit (1881–1954), a Quebec lawyer, economist and academic closely linked with the nearby Université de Montréal.

== Connecting bus routes ==
Société de transport de Montréal
No.	Route	Connects to	Service times / notes
51	Édouard-Montpetit	Laurier; Université-de-Montréal; Snowdon; Montréal-Ouest	Daily Some rush hour services start and end at Snowdon metro
155	Wilderton	Canora; Université-de-Montréal; Côte-des-Neiges	Weekdays, peak only
368 ☾	Avenue-Du-Mont-Royal	Frontenac; Côte-Sainte-Catherine; Plamondon; Namur; De La Savane; Côte-Vertu	Night service

== Nearby points of interest ==
- Université de Montréal:
  - CEPSUM
  - Marie-Victorin building, named for Marie-Victorin
  - Salle Claude Champagne, named for Claude Champagne
- Académie Saint-Germain
- École de musique Vincent d'Indy
