= Mount Royal, Quebec =

Town in Canada

Mount Royal Mont-Royal
- Ville
- Town of Mount Royal; Ville de Mont-Royal
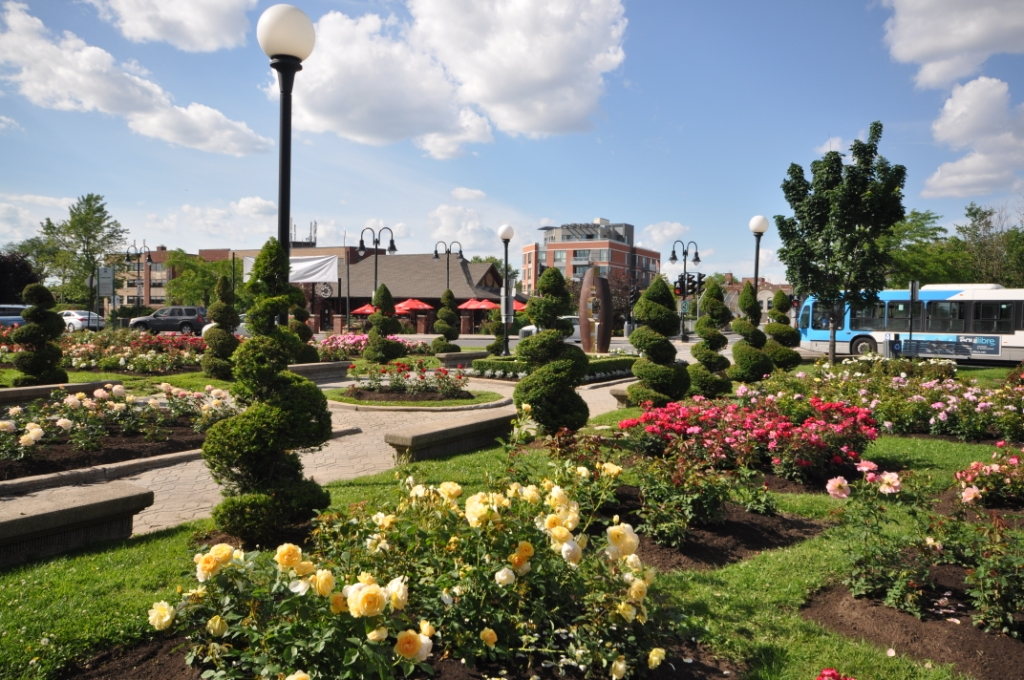
- Connaught Park

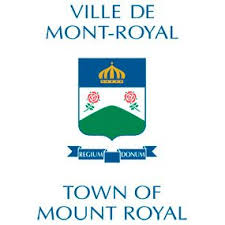
- Logo
- Motto: Regium Donum (Latin for "Royal gift")
- Location on the Island of Montreal

- Location in southern Quebec
- Coordinates: 45°30′58″N 73°38′35″W
- Country: Canada
- Province: Quebec
- Region: Montreal
- RCM: None
- Founded: 1912
- Constituted: January 1, 2006

Government
  - Mayor: Peter J. Malouf
  - Federal riding: Mount Royal
  - Prov. riding: Mont-Royal–Outremont

Area
  - Land: 7.55 km^{2} (2.92 sq mi)

Population (2021)
  - Total: 20,953
  - Density: 2,776.7/km^{2} (7,192/sq mi)
  - Pop. 2016-2021: ▲3.3%
  - Dwellings: 8,192
- Time zone: UTC−5 (EST)
  - Summer (DST): UTC−4 (EDT)
- Postal code(s): H3P, H3R, H4P
- Area codes: 514 and 438
- Highways A-15 (TCH) A-40 (TCH): A-520
- Website: www.ville.mont-royal.qc.ca/en

Mount Royal (French: Mont-Royal [mɔ̃ ʁwajal], officially Town of Mount Royal, French: Ville de Mont-Royal or Ville Mont-Royal, abbreviated TMR, French: VMR) is an affluent on-island suburban town located on the northwest side of the eponymous Mount Royal, northwest of Downtown Montreal, on the Island of Montreal in southwestern Quebec, Canada. It is completely surrounded by the city of Montreal. The population was 20,953 as of the 2021 Canadian census. In 2008, most of the Town of Mount Royal was designated a National Historic Site of Canada, as a "[remarkable] synthesis of urban renewal movements of the early 20th century, reflecting the influence of the City Beautiful, Garden City and Garden Suburb movements". The town celebrated its 100th anniversary in 2012.

== History ==
Town of Mount Royal, or TMR, was founded in 1912. It was created at the initiative of the Canadian Northern Railway as a means of generating funds for the tunnel to be built under the mountain, which would connect the railway to downtown Montreal. The town was designed by Frederick Todd, a planner who was heavily influenced by the likes of Sir Ebenezer Howard and incorporated many aspects of the Garden City Movement as well some elements of the earlier City Beautiful movement into his design. The plan was to build a model city at the foot of Mount Royal. The company bought 4,800 acres (1,900 ha) of farmland, and then built a rail tunnel under Mount Royal connecting their land to downtown Montreal. The profits from the venture helped finance the development of Canadian Northern's transcontinental railroad, which eventually became a significant constituent of the Canadian National Railway system. The town was designed by Canadian Northern's chief engineer, Henry Wicksteed, based loosely on Washington, D.C.

The garden city's coat of arms is composed of several significant elements:

- The royal crown, of French origin, is enclosed in the top panel and blazoned with fleurons.
- Two heraldic roses, of English origin, are stylized wild roses with two rows of five petals separated by pointed sepals.
- The stylized mountain refers to the Town's geographic situation at the foot of Mount Royal.
- The outline of the shield ending in a point recalls the shape of the shields of ancient Greece and Rome.
- Inscribed on the scroll beneath the shield, the motto, Regium Donum, means “gift of the king.”
- Town of Mount Royal's official signature includes the coat of arms as well as the Town's name in French and English. The coat of arms has evolved over the years; the current version dates from 1993.

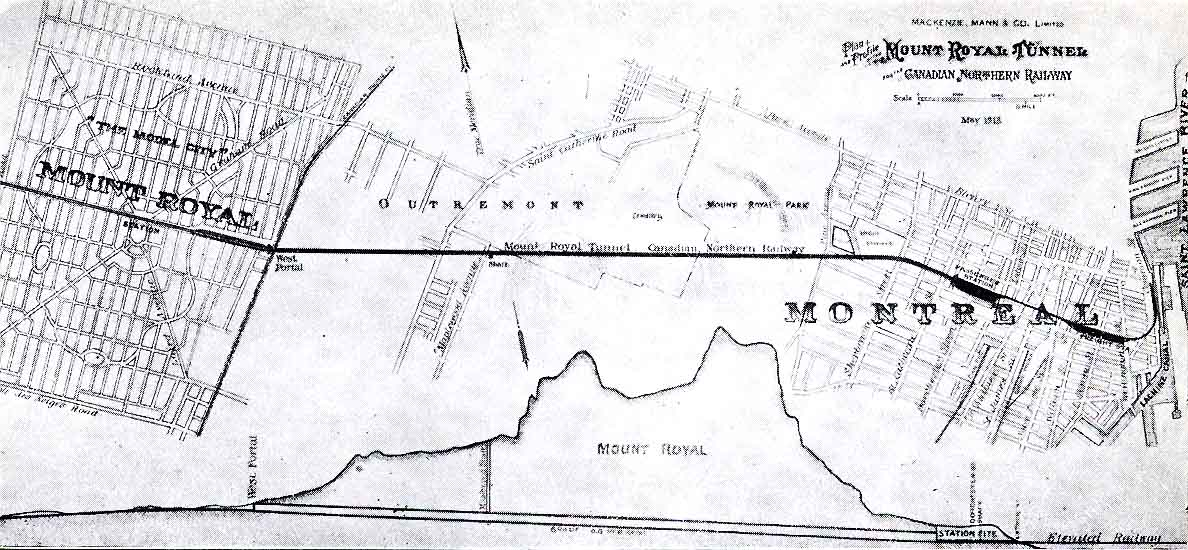
Plan of "Model City" and of the Mount Royal Tunnel

One notable feature of the town is the naming of some of its streets, and also its occasionally idiosyncratic numbering system. Some streets which pass through the town may thus bear two names (in whichever language). For example, Jean Talon Street, a large east–west thoroughfare crossing Montreal for kilometers, goes a few hundred metres through TMR under the name of Dresden Avenue, only to recover its Montreal name on the other side of the town. This situation has been recently addressed by putting the two names on the street signs. On these few hundred metres, TMR uses a house civic numbering totally different from that of Montreal on either side. This sort of change in the numbering system also occurs on smaller streets shared by both Montreal and TMR (for example, Trenton, Lockhart and Brookfield avenues, where the TMR numbering system decreases from East to West, only to jump from 2 to 2400 on the few metres of the street that still belong to Montreal.

In the beginning, the Town was a small farming community, known for its melons. The Daoust family farm grew the celebrated Montreal melon, also called the Montreal nutmeg melon. Green-fleshed and uniquely flavourful, the melons weighed up to 9 or 11 kg (20 or 25 lb). So special was the Montreal melon that it was exported to New York, Chicago and Boston, where, in 1921, people paid as much as $1.50 a slice to taste it. Farming was abandoned over the years, with the gradual urbanization of the Town.

On January 1, 2002, as part of the 2002–2006 municipal reorganization of Montreal, it was merged into Montreal and became a borough. However, after a change of government and a 2004 referendum, it was re-constituted as an independent town on January 1, 2006.

== Geography ==
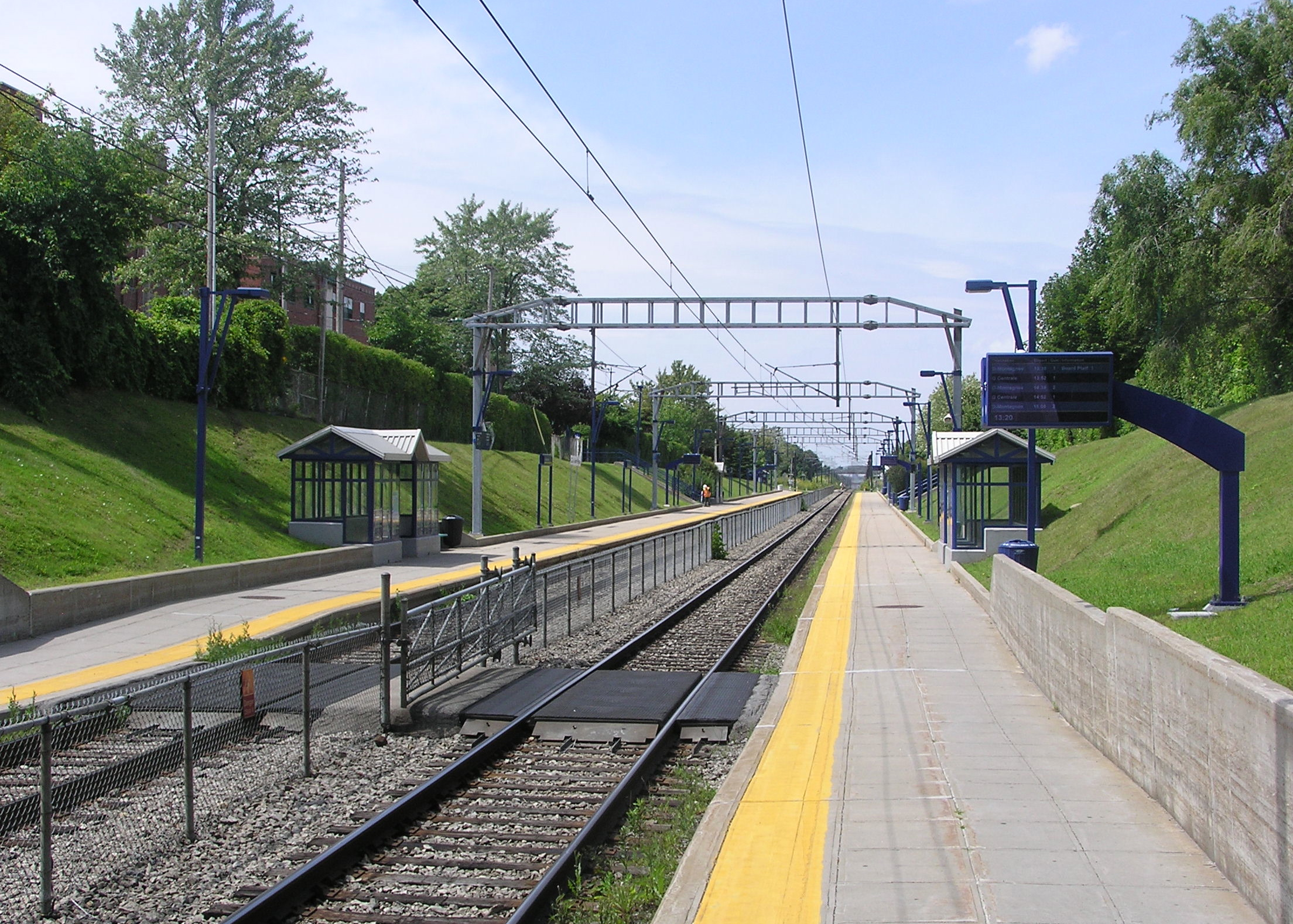
The former Mont-Royal station served many commuters to Downtown Montreal. In 2025, it became an REM station named Ville-de-Mont-Royal.

Two main thoroughfares, Laird Boulevard and Graham Boulevard, cut across the borough diagonally and meet at Connaught Park, a green space located in the centre. Ville-de-Mont-Royal station, a light metro station on the Réseau express métropolitain (REM) network, is located to the east of this park. Trains going through the Mount Royal Tunnel link the station to downtown Montreal in eight minutes. Both boulevards end at Jean Talon Street and close to the highway. TMR is home to the REM's Ville-de-Mont-Royal and Canora stations.

TMR is surrounded on three sides by a highway, a fence and a rail line.

The highway is Metropolitan Boulevard, a major constituent of Autoroute 40. It was built as an elevated highway throughout, except when it passes through TMR (between Sainte Croix Avenue and L'Acadie Boulevard), since the Town council requested that it be built on the ground, in order to separate the town from the industrial area to the north.

A fence runs along the eastern border with Park Extension at L'Acadie Boulevard, a six lane thoroughfare. The stated purpose of the fence is to prevent children and house pets from running into the busy thoroughfare, and to prevent vandalism, but some have contended that it was built to keep residents of the working-class Park Extension neighbourhood out of the town. The City has been accused of purposefully locking the fence, once referred to as "Montreal's Berlin Wall" or "apartheid fending" reckons Geist, a magazine, during Halloween nights.

The rail line is the last portion of Canadian Pacific's Adirondack subdivision. It originally ran through the northern part of the district of Côte-des-Neiges. However, when the town became part of Montreal on Jan 1, 2002, the part of Côte-des-Neiges north of rail line was incorporated into the Mount Royal borough. When the town demerged on Jan 1, 2006 this part, known as Glenmount, reverted to Côte-des-Neiges.

== Demographics ==
Historical populations
Year	Pop.	±%
1921	160	—
1931	2,174	+1258.8%
1941	4,888	+124.8%
1951	11,352	+132.2%
1956	16,990	+49.7%
1961	21,182	+24.7%
1966	21,845	+3.1%
1971	21,560	−1.3%
1976	20,514	−4.9%
1981	19,247	−6.2%
1986	18,350	−4.7%
1991	18,212	−0.8%
1996	18,282	+0.4%
2001	18,682	+2.2%
2006	18,933	+1.3%
2011	19,503	+3.0%
2016	20,276	+4.0%
2021	20,953	+3.3%
Source: Statistics Canada

According to the Office québécois de la langue française, Mont-Royal has been officially recognized as a bilingual municipality since 2005.

In the 2021 Census of Population conducted by Statistics Canada, Mont-Royal had a population of 20,953 living in 7,732 of its 8,192 total private dwellings, a change of 3.3% from its 2016 population of 20,276. With a land area of 7.55 km^{2} (2.92 sq mi), it had a population density of 2,775.2/km^{2} (7,187.8/sq mi) in 2021.

Home language (2021)
Language	Population	Percentage (%)
French	8,930	43%
English	5,720	28%
Other languages	4,110	20%

Mother tongue (2021)
Language	Population	Percentage (%)
French	8,120	39%
English	3,595	17%
Other languages	7,235	35%

Visible Minorities (2021)
Ethnicity	Population	Percentage (%)
Not a visible minority	14,000	68%
Visible minorities	6,695	32%

== Government ==
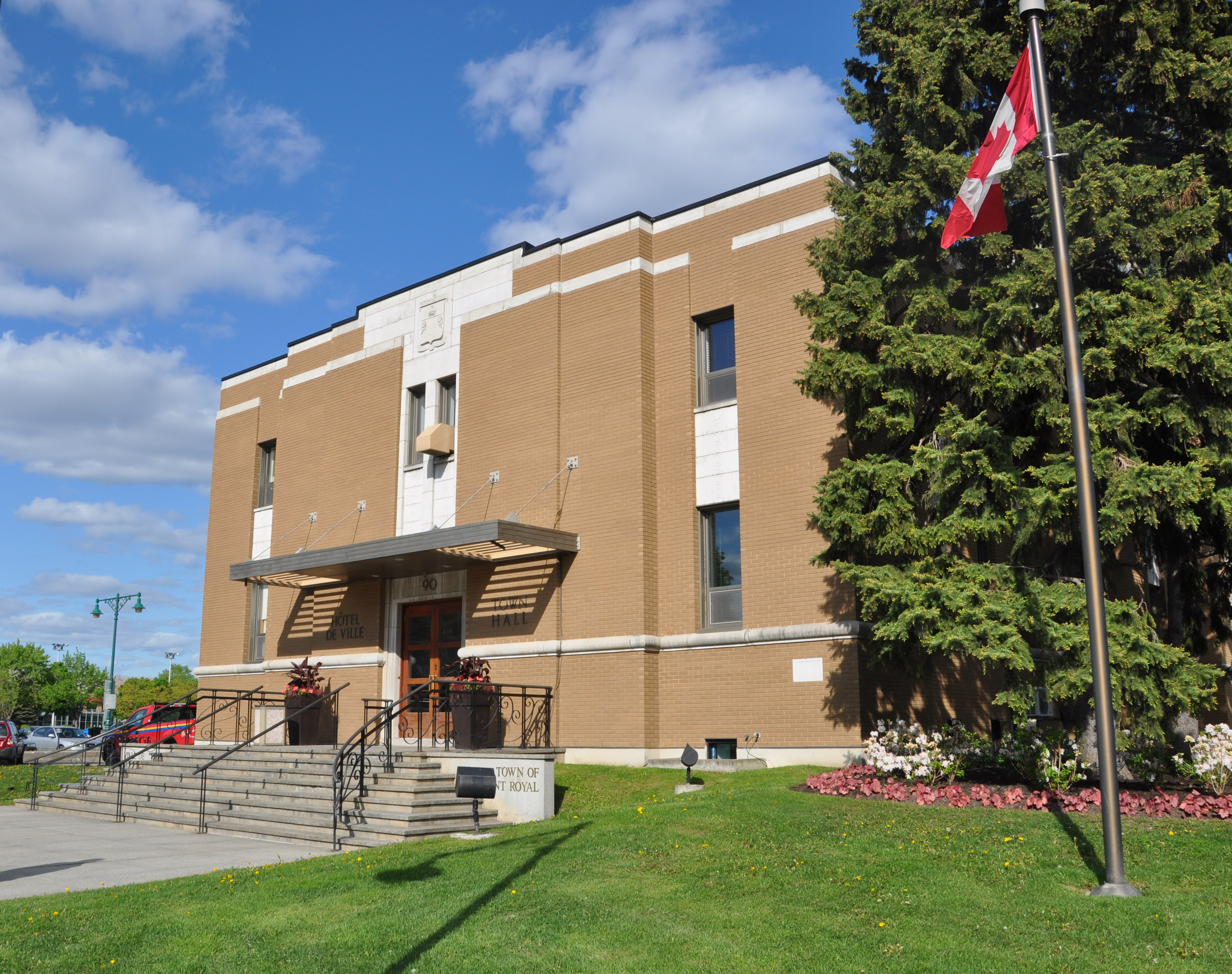
Mont-Royal Town Hall

=== Municipal council ===
Mayor Peter J. Malouf was elected 7 November 2021, defeating former municipal councillor Michelle Setlakwe, the first mayoral election in 16 years. Voter Participation was 48.7%. Despite the COVID pandemic, 6,779 residents voted by mail or in person. Malouf ran again the following elections, and won the 2025 Quebec municipal elections on Nov. 2, 2025, where he grappled 64.00% of the 6,242 tallied votes.

In 2020, TMR was divided from six into eight electoral districts to reflect its growing population of 22,000 residents. The Town mayor sits on the Agglomeration Council of Montreal.

2025-29 Municipal Council:

- Mayor: Peter J. Malouf – 64.00% (3,995 votes)
- Councillors:
  - District No. 1: Antoine Tayar - 68.8% (incumbent, 581 votes)
  - District No. 2: François-Patrick Allard - 61.09% (394 votes)
  - District No. 3: Daniel Pilon - 74.11% (incumbent, 581 votes)
  - District No. 4: Costas Labos - 36.43% (290 votes)
  - District No. 5: Sarah Morgan - 64.61% (491 votes)
  - District No. 6: Caroline Decaluwe - 51.91% (incumbent, 508 votes)
  - District No. 7: Sébastien Dreyfuss - 71.11% (incumbent, 539 votes)
  - District No. 8: Sophie Séguin - 65.65% (incumbent, 604 votes)

=== Former mayors ===
The first mayor of the Town of Mount-Royal was Thomas S. Darling, elected in 1913.

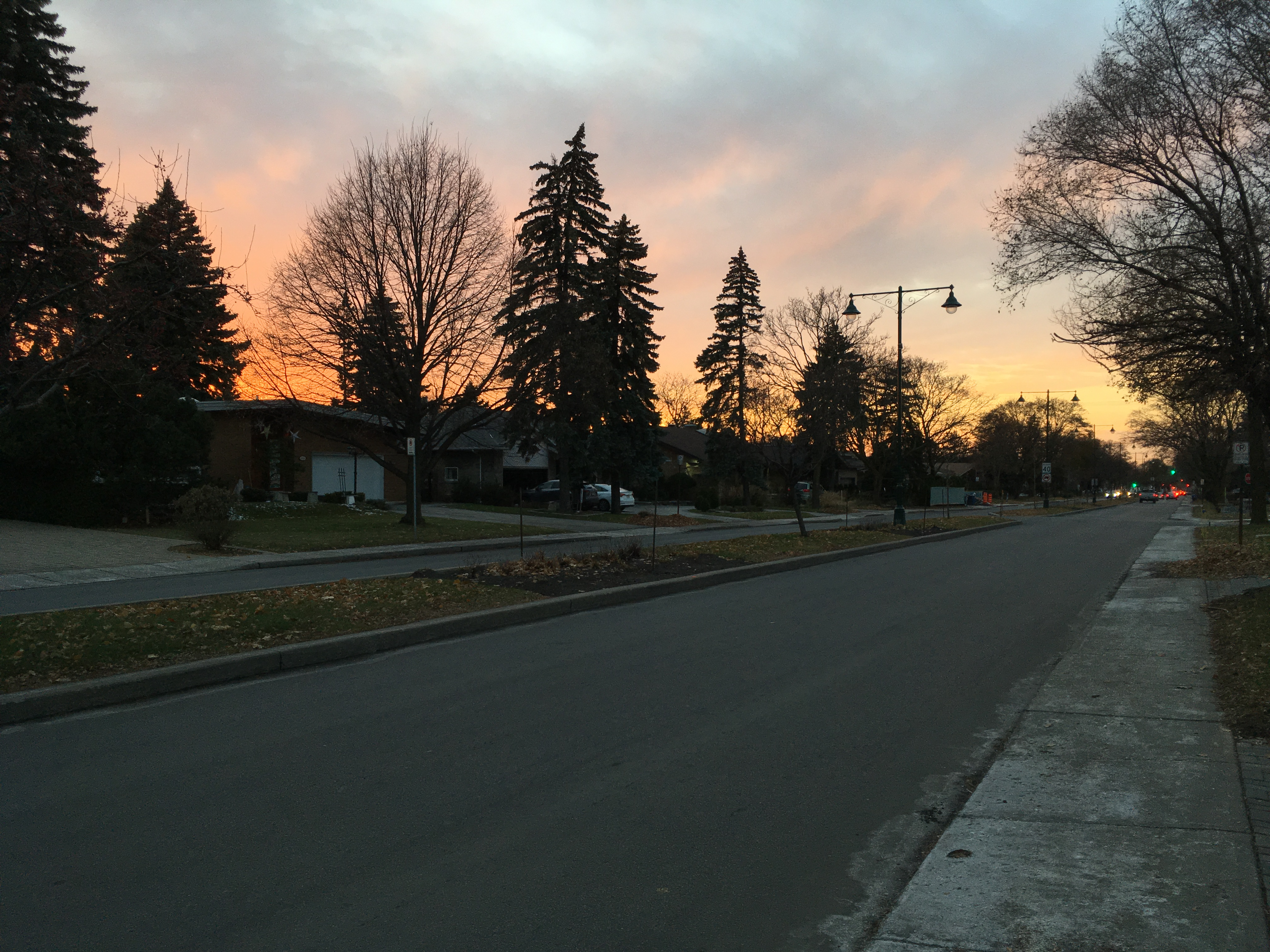
Rockland Road in Mount-Royal at dusk

- Thomas S. Darling (1913-1934)
- Frederick (Fred) Johnson (1934–1935)
- Samuel (Sam) H. Hanson (1935)
- John Arthur Dakin (1935 – 1937)
- Robert Smith (1937 – 1941)
- Maynard Albert Metcalf (1941– 1945)
- Richard Earle Schofield (1945–1951)
- Reginald John Partridge Dawson (1951–1987
- Vera Mystic Danyluk (1987–1994)
- Harry Schwartz (1994–1999)
- Pierre Brisebois (1999 interim)
- Ricardo Hrtschan (1999 – 2001)
- Suzanne Caron (2002 – 2005)
- Vera Mystic Danyluk (2005 – 2010)
- Philippe Roy (2010 –2021)
- Peter J. Malouf (2021 – )

=== Federal and Provincial ===
The entire borough is located within the federal riding of Mount Royal, whose best-known MP for nearly 20 years was Pierre Trudeau, and within the smaller provincial electoral district of Mount Royal. The Mount Royal riding has been a Liberal stronghold since 1940.

The riding encompasses Côte St. Luc, Hampstead, Côte des Neiges and the Town of Mount Royal. Since 2015, Anthony Housefather has served as Member of The House of Commons - Mount Royal

Mount Royal shares its provincial territory with Outremont since 2018, making it the Mont-Royal–Outremont provincial electoral district. Since October 2022, the riding is represented by Liberal Michelle Setlakwe, who replaced longtime MP Pierre Arcand.

== Education ==
The Commission scolaire Marguerite-Bourgeoys (CSMB) operates Francophone public schools.

Secondary schools:

- École secondaire Mont-Royal
- École secondaire Pierre-Laporte

Primary schools:

- École primaire Académie Saint-Clément
- École primaire Saint-Clément Ouest
- École primaire Saint-Clément Est

The English Montreal School Board (EMSB) operates Anglophone public schools in the town.

- Carlyle Elementary School
- Dunrae Gardens Elementary School

The Town has its own library, Reginald J. P. Dawson Library, which is independent from the Montreal Library Network.

== See also ==
- List of anglophone communities in Quebec
- List of enclaves
- List of former boroughs
- Montreal Merger
- Municipal reorganization in Quebec
