= André Bouchard (environmentalist) =

André Bouchard (January 26, 1946 – 4 March 2010) was a Canadian ecologist and environmentalist who spent most of his career at Université de Montréal (UdeM) and the Montreal Botanical Garden. His specialties included landscape ecology and plant community ecology, and he received several awards during his lifetime.

== Biography ==
Bouchard was born in 1946 in Montreal and grew up in Côte-des-Neiges, although his family came from Saint-Anicet, and maintained a secondary residence there. His father, Louis G. Bouchard, was a successful leather goods supplier. He studied first at Collège Jean-De-Brébeuf before graduating with a degree in biological sciences from Université de Montréal. He went to McGill and Cornell University for his postgraduate studies, which he completed in the 1970s. (Note: His dissertation is dated from 1975, the same year he became curator at the Botanical Garden.)

In 1975 he began teaching at his alma mater Université de Montréal, while simultaneously becoming curator at the Botanical Garden. He would remain at the University until his death, and at the garden for 21 years. As curator, his primary duty was directing research at the garden. His own research discussed the flora of Newfoundland (Gros Morne National Park was the topic of his doctorate dissertation) and of southwestern Quebec. His creative use of notarized acts to study the evolution of Quebec forest since New France led to significant discoveries regarding the evolution of beech-maple forests.

Beyond scientific work, he rapidly became known for his involvement in various environmental issues, notably the fight to save the Bois de Saraguay, an old-growth forest on the northern side of Montreal Island that was threatened by developers. (Note: He would say of this that it was "like a fast-track doctorate in political science.") Over the years, he invested himself in numerous other debates, such as those over the Boisé du Tremblay in Longueuil, the Muir Forest in Hichinbrooke (now the Boisé-des-Muir Ecological Reserve) and, closer to home, the Little and Large Tea Field, two peat bogs in his native town of Saint-Anicet. He was also a member of the 2004 Commission Coulombe whose report was to define provincial forest exploitation policy. Although he was well aware that he and his fellow commissioner would catch flak from the industry for the recommendations (which included a 20% reductions of wood cuts), he pushed forward with the belief that these were the right decisions to make.

Having been a close collaborator of Pierre Bourque, he was named director of the Botanical Garden in 1994 when Bourque had to leave the position following his election as mayor. It was a short stay, both because he had notified the administration he considered it an interim position, and because he was not comfortable with the complicated administrative apparatus connected to the position. In 2002, he became the first director of the newly founded Institut de Recherche en Biology Végétale (IRBV), a position he occupied until 2006. All these years he continued to teach at the Université, and directed over 45 master's and doctorate students. He also sat on the Montreal Heritage Council from 2006 to 2008, (Note: About this stay, a fellow member of the Council noted: "he taught us that a council which fails to annoy is a useless council.") on the Centre hospitalier universitaire Sainte-Justine board of directors, and received awards from the Quebec Association of Biologists (prix Georges-Préfontaine, 2005) and the Acfas (prix Michel-Jurdant for environmentalism, 1990).

In addition to his environmental and scientific work, he had a keen interest in history, both local and scientific. In 1998 he published a short historical account of the botanical garden, and in 2007 a compendium of correspondence from Marie-Victorin. At the time of his death, he was working on books about southern Quebec wetlands and a biography of Marie-Victorin. A great admirer of the man, he had retraced Marie-Victorin's expeditions in Cuba and organized an exposition on the topic. A founding member of the local history society of Saint-Anicet, he wrote several accounts of prominent locals such as Jules and Paul-Émile Léger, whose families had local ties. He had also been heavily involved on two book projects on the local church and the municipality itself.

Bouchard died from a heart attack on March 4, 2010, in Montreal's Central Station, a few months from his planned retirement. Bourque presented his condolences, and flags at the Botanical Garden were flown half-staff for several days. He was married with three children. In June of that year, he was a granted a posthumous honoris causa doctorate from Université Laval.

== Selected publications ==
- Bouchard, André, and Paul F. Maycock. (1970) "A phytogeographical and phytosociological study of Viola rotundifolia in Eastern Canada." Canadian Journal of Botany. 48(12):2285-2302. doi:10.1139/b70-331
- ——————— (1970) The phytosociology of the northern conifer-hardwoods of the Appalachian foothills in Southern Quebec. M.Sc. Thesis, McGill University, Montreal, Canada. OCLC 56536699
- Auclair, Allan N., André Bouchard, and Josephine Pajaczkowski. (1973) "Plant composition and species relations on the Huntingdon Marsh, Québec." Canadian Journal of Botany 51(6):1231-1247. doi:10.1139/b73-154
- ——————— (1975) Natural Resources Analysis of a Section of the Gros Morne National Park, in Newfoundland, Canada. Ph.D. Thesis, Cornell University, Ithaca, N.Y. OCLC 3013761
- Auclair, Allan N., André Bouchard and Josephine Pajaczkowski. (1976) "Productivity Relations in a Carex-Dominated Ecosystem." Oecologia 26(1):9-31. doi:10.1007/BF00345650
- ———————, Stuart Hay and Ernest Rouleau. (1978) "The vascular flora of St-Barbe South District, Newfoundland: An interpretation based on biophysiographic areas." Rhodora 80(822):228-308.
- ———————, Denis Barabé, Madeleine Dumais and Stuart Hay. (1983) Les plantes vasculaires rares du Québec = The rare vascular plants of Québec. "Syllogeus", 48 (ISSN 0704-576X). 79 p.
- ———————, Denis Barabé, Yves Bergeron, Madeleine Dumais and Stuart Hay. (1985) "La phytogéographie des plantes vasculaires rares du Québec." Le Naturaliste canadien (ISSN 0028-0798) 112(2):283-300.
- ———————, Stéphan Dyrda, Yves Bergeron, and Alain Meilleur. (1989) "The use of notary deeds to estimate the changes in the composition of 19th century forests, in Haut-Saint-Laurent, Québec." Canadian Journal of Forest Research 19(9):1146-1150. doi:10.1139/x89-173
- ———————, Stuart Hay, Luc Brouillet, Martin Jean and Isabelle saucier. (1991) Les plantes vasculaires rares de l'Île de Terre-Neuve = The rare vascular plants of the Island of Newfoundland. "Syllogeus", 65. 165 p. ISBN 0-660-50311-5
- ——————— 1992. Journal de voyage en Chine. Une famille Québécoise au Pays du Milieu. Montréal: Méridien. 280 p. ISBN 2-89415-073-3
- Simard, Hélène, and André Bouchard. (1996) "The precolonial 19th century forest of the Upper St.Lawrence region of Quebec: a record of its exploitation and transformation through notary deeds of wood sales." Canadian Journal of Forest Research 26(9):1670-1676. doi:10.1139/x26-188
- ——————— and Francine Hoffman (1998) Le Jardin botanique de Montréal: esquisse d'une histoire. Saint-Laurent: Fides. 112 p. ISBN 2-7621-2057-8
- Charest, René, Luc Brouillet, André Bouchard, and Stuart Hay. (2000) "The vascular flora of Terra Nova National Park, Newfoundland, Canada: a biodiversity analysis from a biogeographical and life-form perspective." Canadian Journal of Botany. 78(5):629-645. doi:10.1139/cjb-78-5-629
- ——————— and Martin Jean. (2001) "Historique d'un paysage de tourbières profondément transformé par l'homme" In Serge Payette and Line Rochefort (eds.). Écologie des tourbières du Québec-Labrador. Quebec City: Presses de l'Université Laval. pp. 389–398. ISBN 2-7637-7773-2
- Domon, Gérald, and André Bouchard. (2007) "The landscape history of Godmanchester (Quebec, Canada): two centuries of shifting relationships between anthropic and biophysical factors." Landscape Ecology 22(8):1201-1214. doi:10.1007/s10980-007-9100-z
- ———————, ed. (2007) Marie-Victorin à Cuba. Correspondance avec le frère Léon. Montréal: Presses de l'Université de Montréal. 217 p. ISBN 978-2-7606-2066-7
- ——————— (2007) "Sur le chemin de Marie-Victorin à Holguin, Cuba." Quatre-temps (ISSN 0820-5515) 31(3):8-12.
- Laliberté, Étienne, André Bouchard and Alain Cogliastro. (2008) "Optimizing hardwood reforestation in old fields: the effects of treeshelters and environmental factors on tree seedling growth and physiology." Restoration Ecology 16(2):270-280. doi:10.1111/j.1526-100X.2007.00270.x
- ——————— (2008) "Sur le chemin de Marie-Victorin à la Punta de Maisí, Cuba." Quatre-temps 32(3):8-11.
- ——————— (2009) "Sur le chemin de Marie-Victorin à Trinidad et Topes de Collantes, Cuba." Quatre-temps 33(3):42-46.

== Notes and references ==
Notes

Preceded by Pierre Bourque	Director of the Montreal Botanical Garden (interim); April 1994 – January(?) 1995	Succeeded by Lise Cormier
