= Raimbault Creek =

Coordinates: 45.4959°N 73.6104°W

Raimbault Creek was a watercourse on the Island of Montreal in present-day Côte-des-Neiges and Saint-Laurent which drained into the Rivière des Prairies. Côte-des-Neiges Road follows the path of the former creek between the two summits of Mount Royal. In the 1950s or early 1960s, the city of Montreal covered over the creek, making it into an underground collector sewer.

It was possibly named after Pierre Raimbault (1671–1740), landowner and notary.
