= Montreal Botanical Garden =

Botanical Garden in Montreal, Quebec

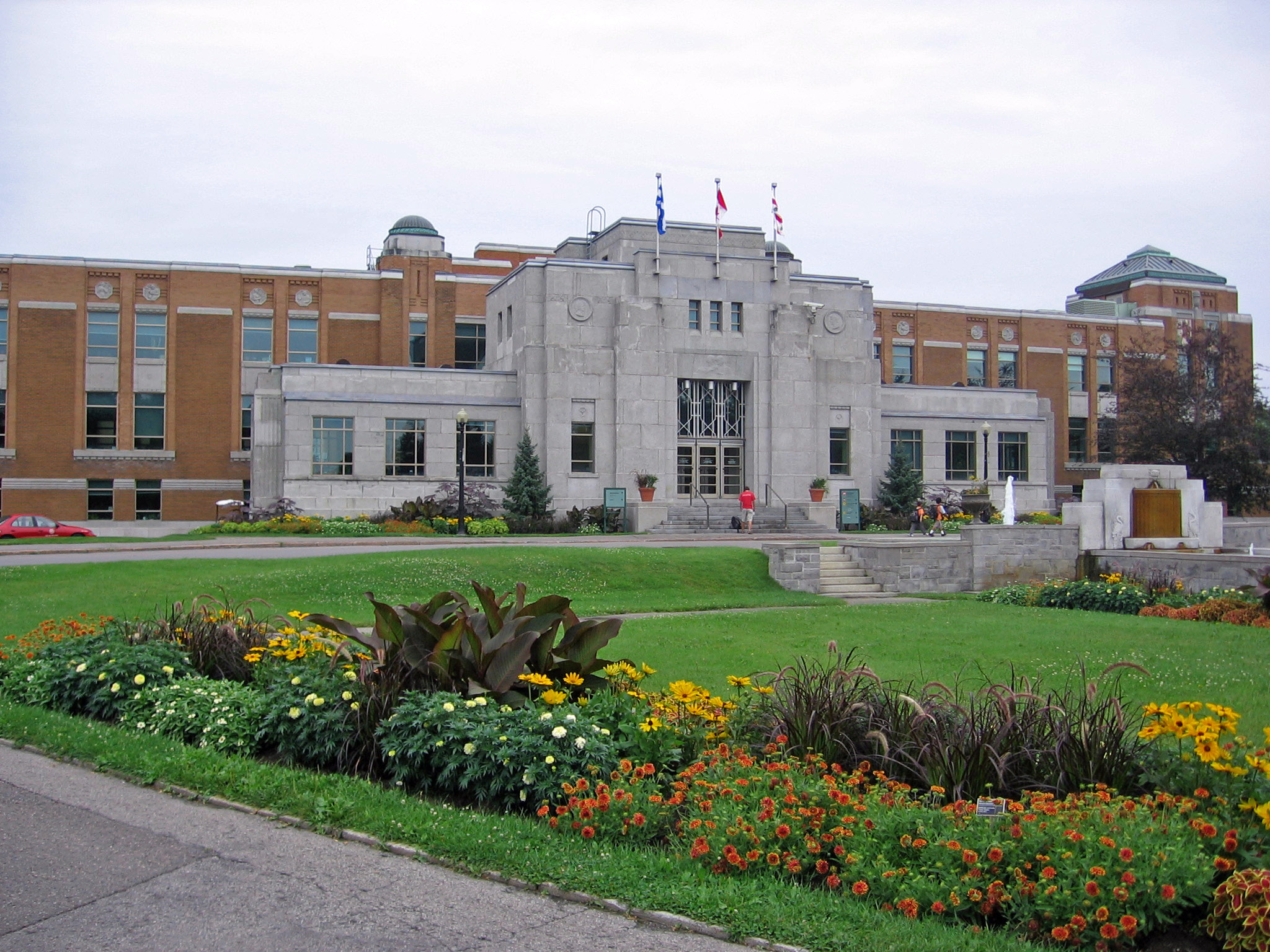
- The administration building
- Interactive map of Montreal Botanical Garden
- 45°33′26.00″N 73°33′24.50″W
- Date opened: June 9, 1931
- Location: 4101 Sherbrooke Street East, Montreal, Quebec; H1X 2B2
- Land area: 75 hectares (190 acres)
- No. of species: 22,000
- Annual visitors: 695,404 (2011) including Insectarium
- Public transit: at Pie-IX station
- Website: espacepourlavie.ca/en/botanical-garden

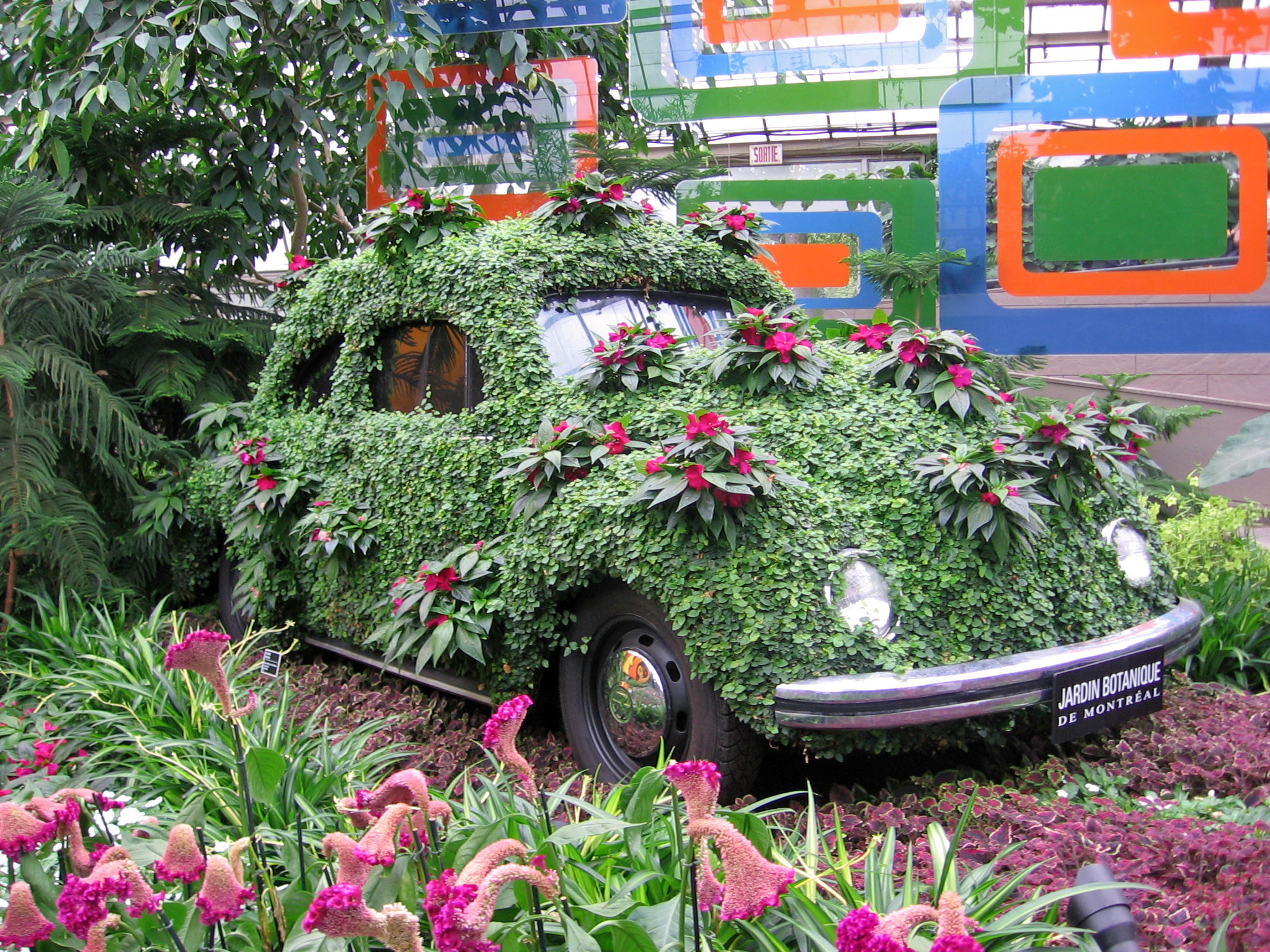
Flower covered Beetle in the Montreal Botanical Garden greenhouse, 2005

The Montreal Botanical Garden (French: Jardin botanique de Montréal, pronounced [ʒaʁdɛ̃ bɔtanik də mɔ̃ʁeal]) is a large botanical garden in Montreal, Quebec, Canada comprising 75 hectares (190 acres) of thematic gardens and greenhouses. It was designated a National Historic Site of Canada in 2008 as it is considered to be one of the most important botanical gardens in the world due to the extent of its collections and facilities.

== Background ==
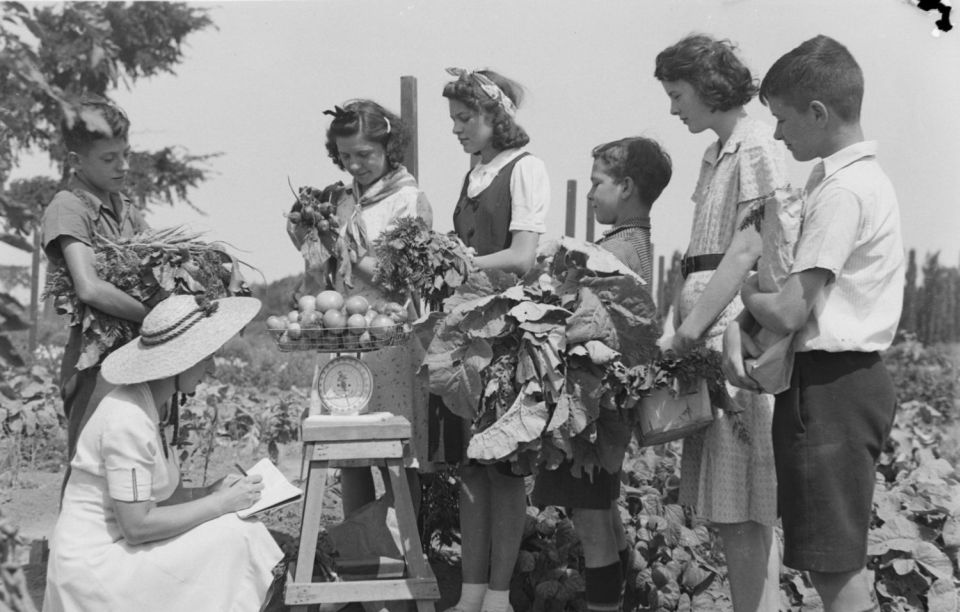
Children at the Montreal Botanical Garden in 1941

The botanical garden is located at 4101 Sherbrooke Street East, at the corner of Pie-IX and Sherbrooke Streets, in Maisonneuve Park, located in the borough of Rosemont–La Petite-Patrie, facing Montreal's Olympic Stadium. It contains a greenhouse complex full of plants from around the world, and a number of large outdoor gardens, each with a specific theme. The outdoor gardens are bare and covered with snow from about November until about April, but the greenhouses are open to visitors year round, hosting the annual Butterflies Go Free exhibit from February to April.

The garden was founded in 1931, in the height of the Great Depression, by mayor Camillien Houde, after years of campaigning by Fr. Marie-Victorin, also the author of the Flore laurentienne. The grounds were designed by Henry Teuscher, while the Art Deco style administration building was designed by architect Lucien F. Kéroack.

It serves to educate the public in general and students of horticulture in particular, as well as to conserve endangered plant species. The grounds are also home to a botanical research institution, to the Société d'astronomie de Montréal, and to the Montreal Insectarium; offsite, the garden staff also administer the Ferme Angrignon educational farm and petting zoo.

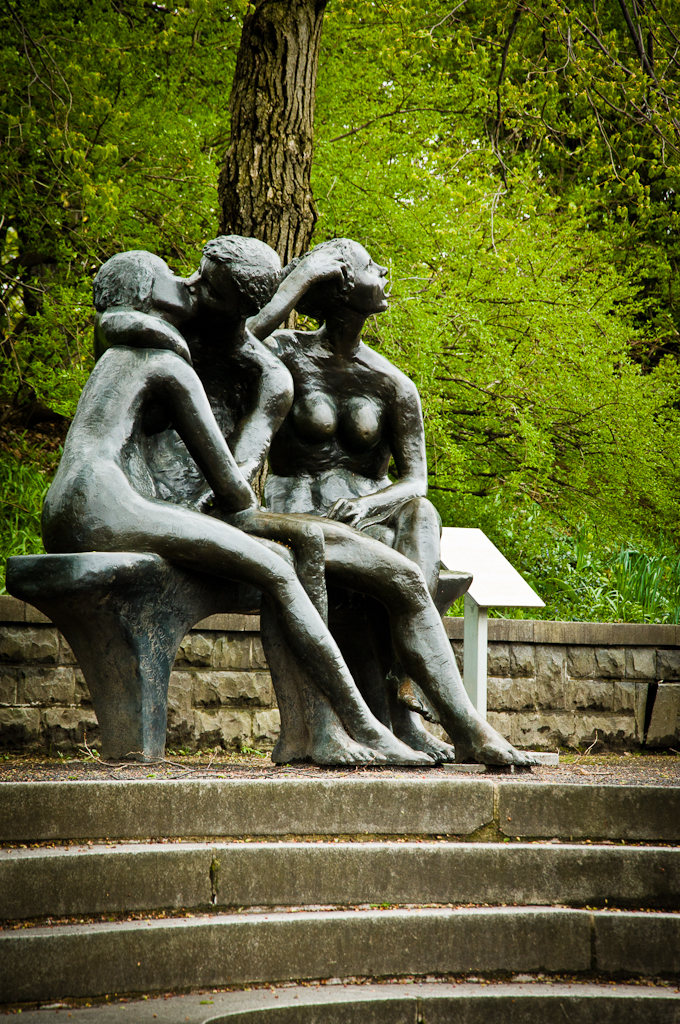
Le banc des amoureux by Léa Vivot

While it charges admission, city residents can obtain a pass granting free admission to the outdoor gardens, so many people visit regularly, even if only to sit under the trees. The nearest metro station is Pie-IX, which is located on the corner of the Olympic Stadium.

The Montreal Botanical Garden is one of four nature-focused attractions belonging to the City of Montreal in the Space for Life (French: Espace pour la vie) museum district. The others are the Biodome, the Insectarium, and the Rio Tinto Alcan Planetarium, all of which are near the Olympic Stadium.

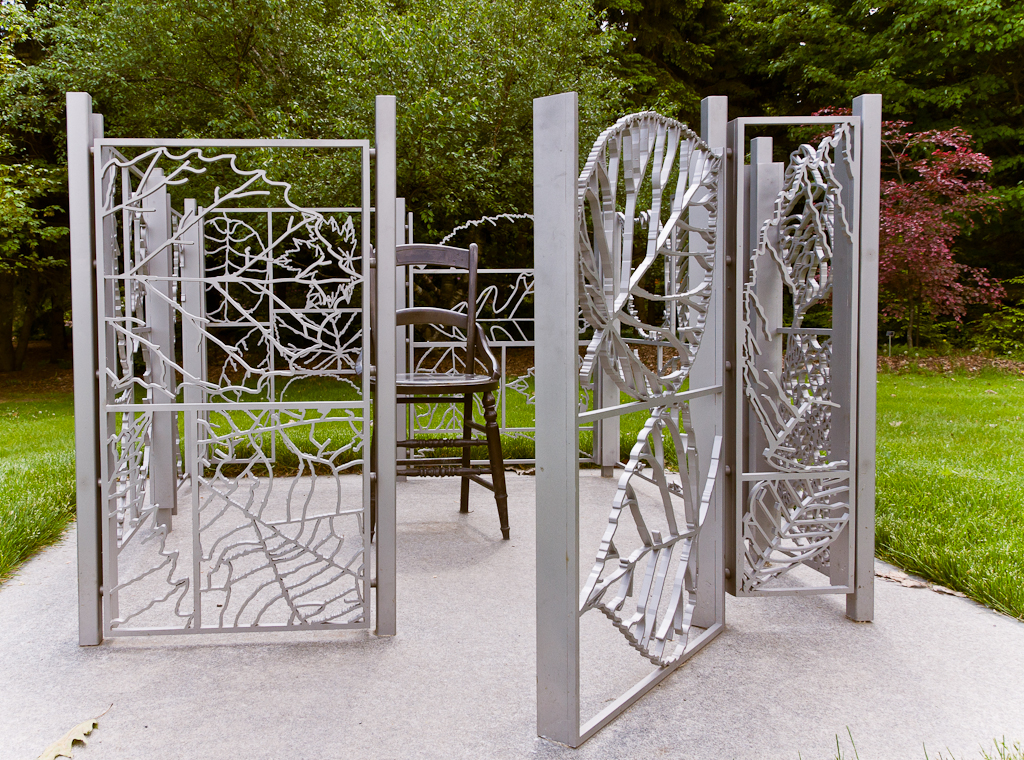
Un jardin à soi, Michel Goulet

== Gardens ==
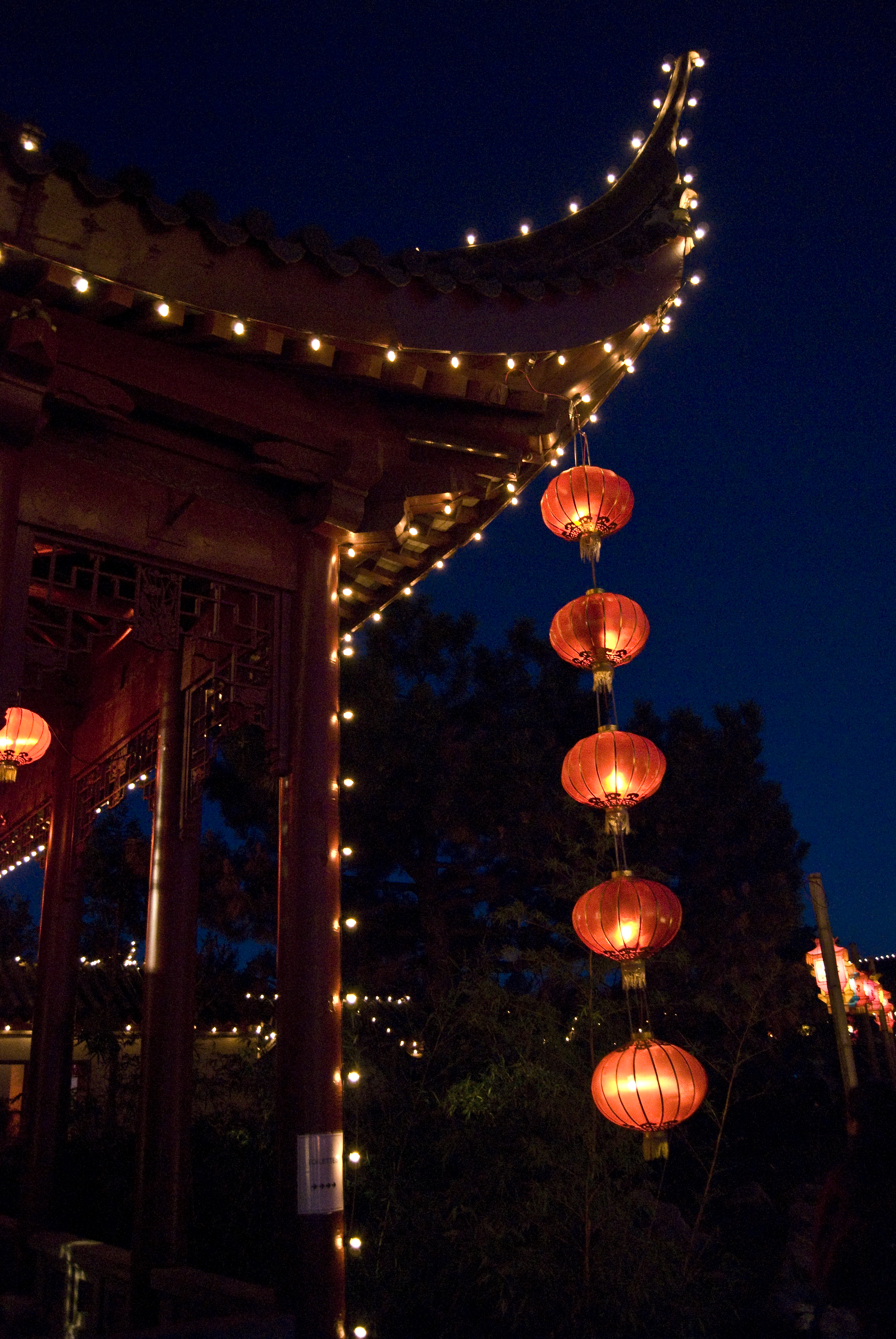
The Magic of Lanterns, The Chinese Garden

Butterflies Go Free video

The Chinese Garden is constructed along the traditional lines for a Ming dynasty Chinese garden. Covering 2.5 hectares, it has many winding paths, an artificial mountain, and a building in the Chinese style housing a collection of bonsai and penjing that have been donated. The garden is populated with Chinese plants. The garden was constructed from 1990 to 1991 by 50 artisans from the Shanghai Institute of Landscape Design and Architecture, directed by Le Weizhong. The project required 120 containers of material imported from Shanghai, including 500 tonnes of stone from Lake Tai in Jiangsu province.

The Japanese Garden was created in 1988 under the direction of designer Ken Nakajima. Its 2.5 hectares are populated with Japanese plants, and it contains a building in the Japanese style containing an exhibit on tea. The Japanese tea ceremony is performed there during the summer, and anyone can take classes to learn more about it. Other traditional Japanese arts, such as Iaido and Ikebana are occasionally demonstrated there as well. It also includes a large koi pond; visitors often feed the koi. The garden hosts an annual Hiroshima memorial ceremony on the 5th of August, with the hourly ringing of a Japanese Peace Bell made in Hiroshima.

The First Nations Garden was opened in 2001 to honour and present the cultures of the indigenous population of Canada. Species endemic to Quebec and other North American regions are kept in the garden; the maple, birch, and pine trees shade its paths, and the garden brings into focus the medicinal and food plants of the First Nations. It has several totem poles and exhibits demonstrating traditional artwork and construction methods.

The Alpine Garden has several paths winding over a rocky outcrop which is covered with tiny, delicate alpine plants.

Other gardens include the poisonous plants garden (which has samples of various poisonous plants along with information on the effects of various doses), the economic plants exhibit, the flowery brook, and an arboretum. A maple and hickory forest is the theme of Quebec Corner, showcasing species native to Montreal and the surrounding region. The Garden of Innovations showcases plants released commercially, and is replanted yearly. There is also a Monastery Garden and a Medicinal Plants Garden.

The botanical gardens are also the home to some wildlife; primarily squirrels and ducks, other slightly less common animals such as turtles and herons also live there.

== Lion de la Feuillée ==
Lion de la Feuillée
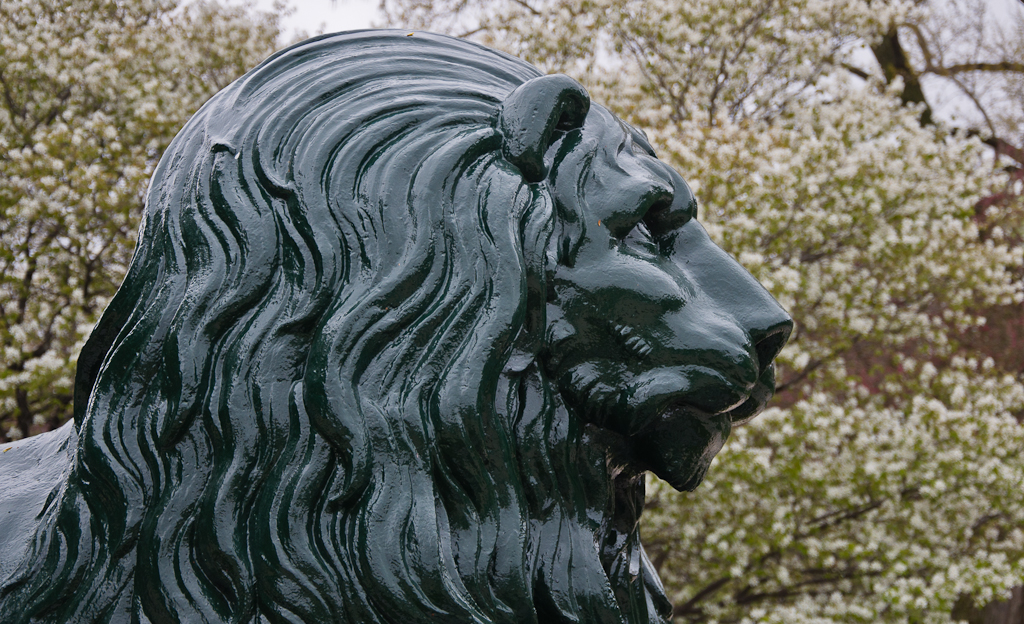
- Interactive map of Lion de la Feuillée
- Location: Sherbrooke Street
- Coordinates: 45.55868°N 73.55565°W
- Type: Monument
- Material: Bronze
- Height: 1.4 metres (4.6 ft)
- Opening date: September 28, 1831

The Lion de la Feuillée is a monument and sculpture located inside the Montreal Botanical Garden. The huge lion that lies at the entrance to the rose garden was donated by the city of Lyon on the occasion of the 350th anniversary of Montreal in 1992.

The first bridge over the Feuillée was open to the public on 28 September 1831 in the heart of the city of Lyon, France. The Feuillée Lion is one of four castings of the original work, created by René Dardel. During the reconstruction of the bridge in 1910, the four lions were relocated. In 1992, one of them was brought to Montreal.

== Ouellet-Robert Entomological Collection ==
Ouellet-Robert Entomological Collection
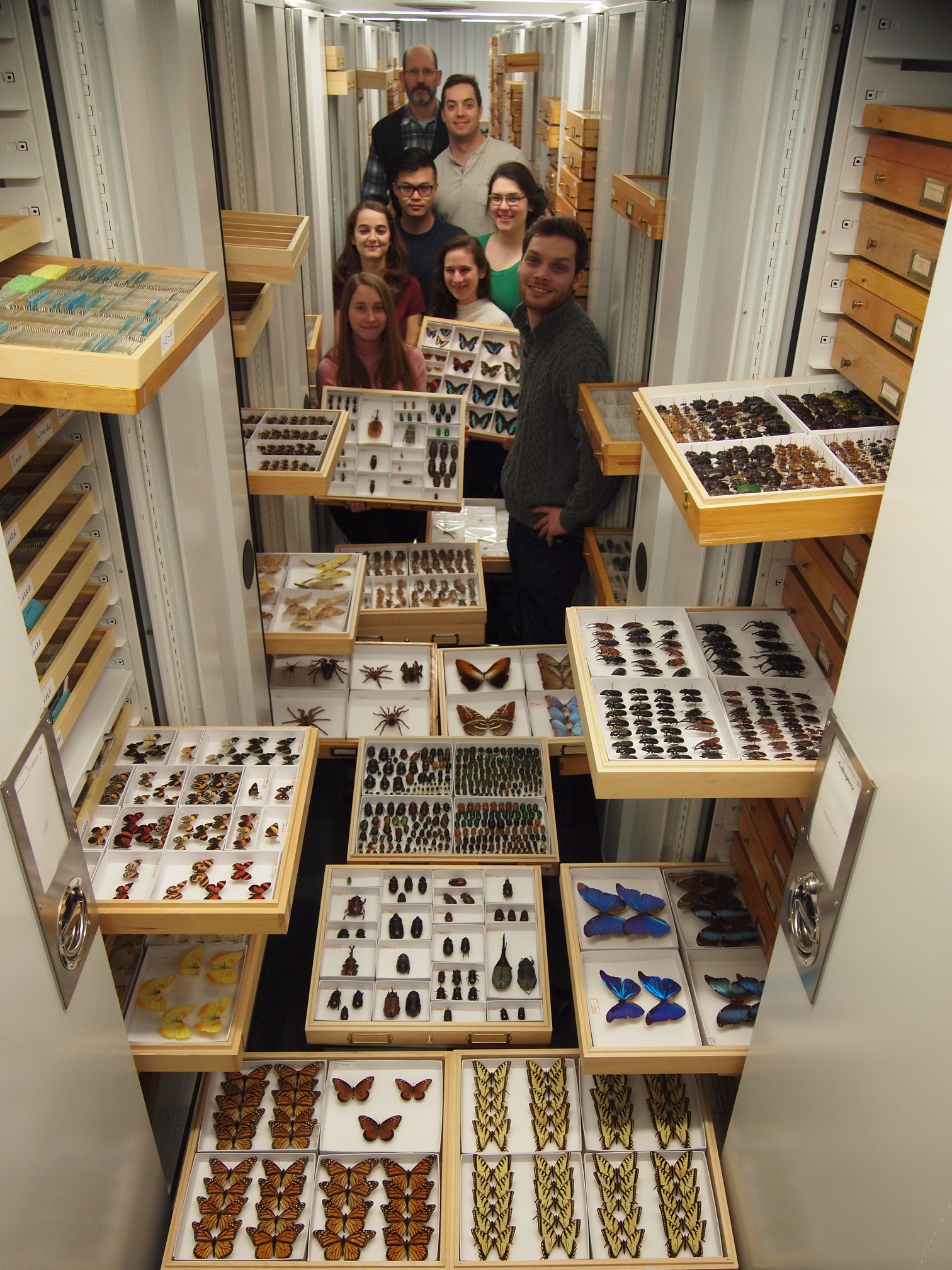

- Location within Montreal
- Coordinates: 45.55790°N 73.5560°W
- Website: https://qmor.umontreal.ca/welcome/

The Ouellet-Robert Collection, abbreviated as QMOR, is the entomological collection of the University of Montreal. It is one of the most important in Canada and the second largest in Quebec, with 1.5 million specimens as of 2019. It is housed at the Institute for Research in Plant Biology (IRBV) at the Biodiversity Center, located on the grounds of the Montreal Botanical Garden.

== Sport ==
During the 1976 Summer Olympics, it hosted the 20 km walk athletics and the running part of the modern pentathlon event.

== Notable directors ==
- Pierre Bourque 1980–1994
- André Bouchard 1994–2010
