= Côte-des-Neiges Road =

Road in Montreal, Canada

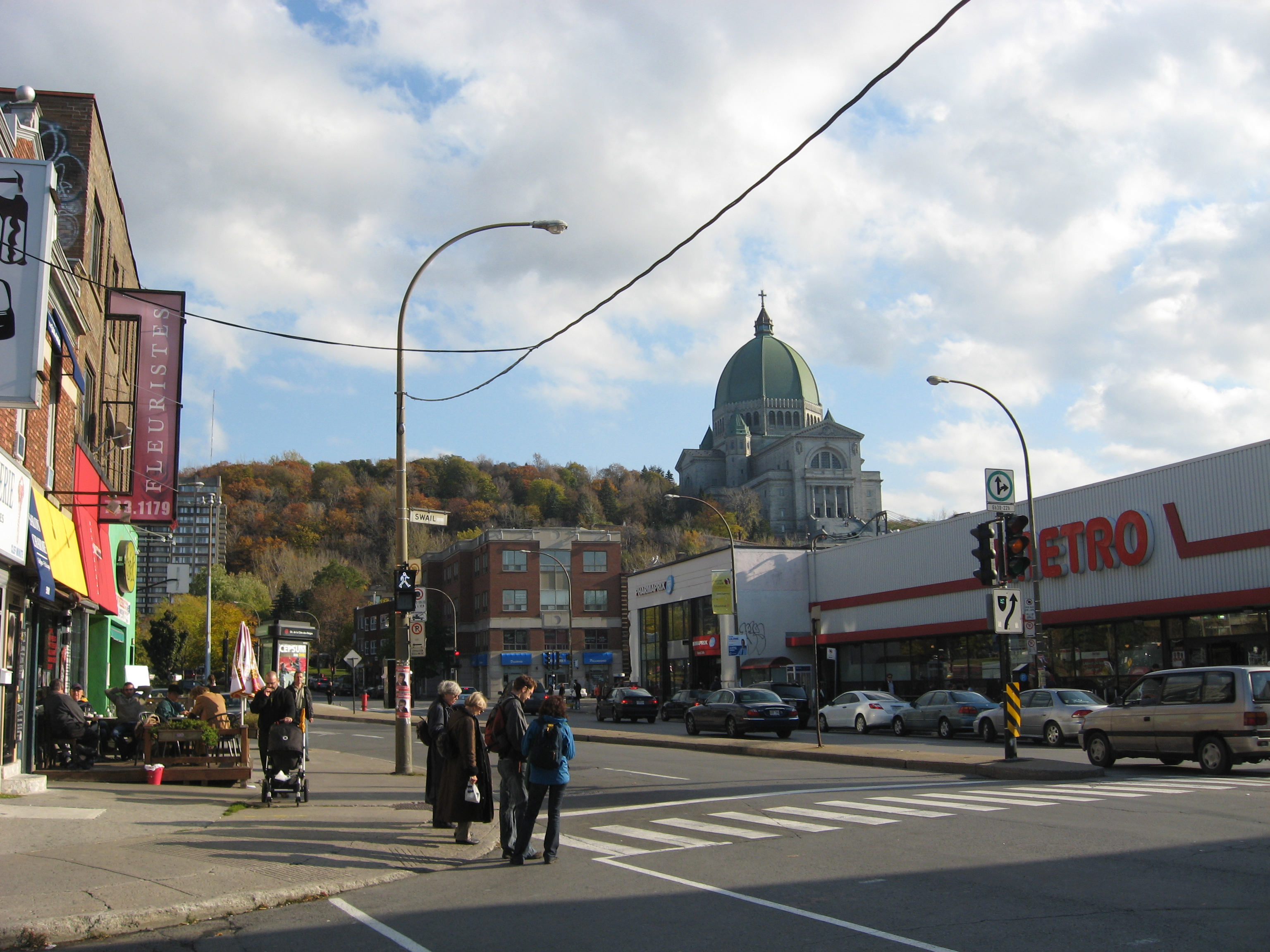
- Côte-des-Neiges Road at Swail Avenue in Côte-des-Neiges, with Saint Joseph's Oratory in the distance and a Metro to the right.
- Interactive map of Côte-des-Neiges Road
- Native name: chemin de la Côte-des-Neiges (French)
- Owner: City of Montreal
- Length: 5.1 km (3.2 mi)
- Location: Montreal
- Coordinates: 45.495315°N 73.594553°W
- South end: Sherbrooke Street West, Quartier Concordia (continues as Guy Street)
- Major junctions: R-138 Sherbrooke Street
- North end: Jean Talon Street West, Côte-des-Neiges

Construction
- Inauguration: 1862

Côte-des-Neiges Road (officially in French: chemin de la Côte-des-Neiges [ʃəmɛ̃ də la kot de nɛʒ]) is a street in Montreal, home to Plaza Côte-des-Neiges. It is served by Métro Côte-des-Neiges and two bus lanes. BIXI bike rental is also available. It extends from the intersection of Sherbrooke Street and Guy Street in the south to Jean-Talon Street and Laird Boulevard in the north, at the border with the Town of Mount Royal. Part of it follows the path of the former Raimbault Creek (now an underground collector sewer) between the main peak of Mount Royal and Westmount Summit.

It is the economic and cultural heart of the Côte-des-Neiges neighbourhood. Côte-des-Neiges Road features a variety of culturally diverse cuisine in its many restaurants; Québécois/Canadian, British, French, Chinese, Lebanese, Vietnamese and Italian alongside many of the popular fast food franchises. Supermarkets and a farmer market also offer victuals to the local residents. Libraries and a school are also present.

The proximity of the Université de Montréal generates a large student population in the neighborhood alongside the ethnically diverse population.

Notable addresses as it passes over Mount Royal include the Notre Dame des Neiges Cemetery and Îlot-Trafalgar-Gleneagles historic block.

== See also ==
- 165 Côte-des-Neiges
- 166 Queen Mary
- Côte-des-Neiges station
