= Henry Teuscher =

Landscape architect, horticulturalist, and botanist

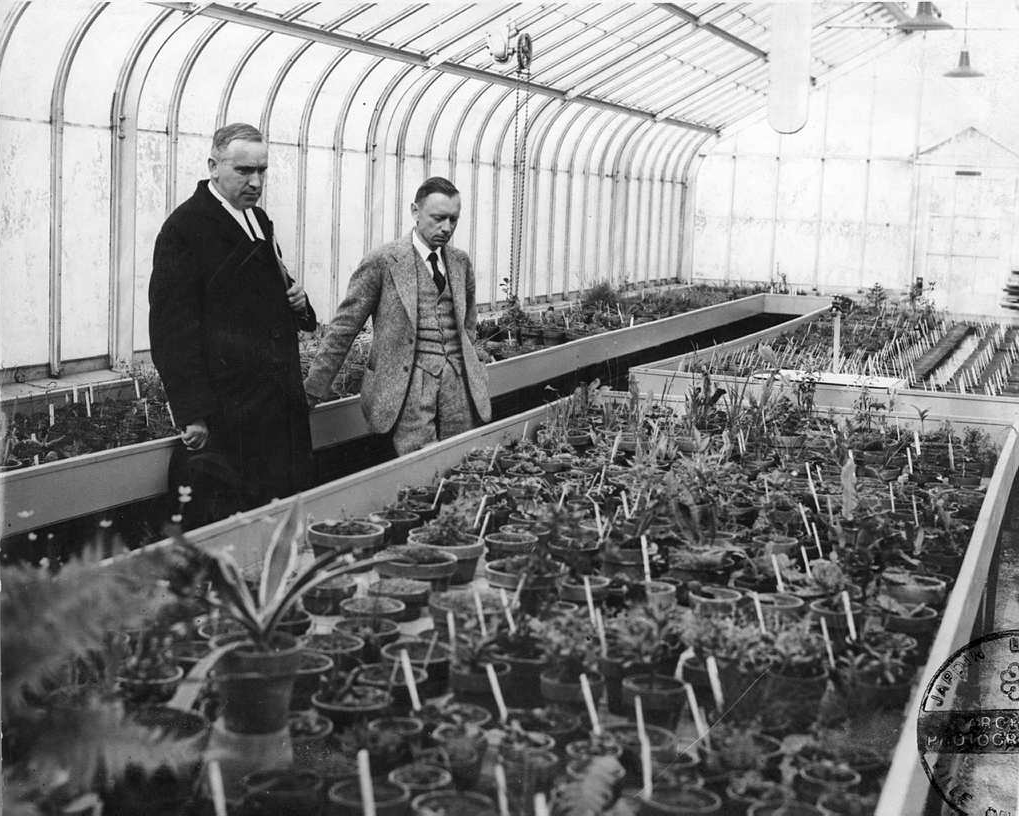
Teuscher (center) with Marie-Victorin Kirouac, 1936

Heinrich (Henry) Teuscher (May 8, 1891 in Berlin – August 9, 1984, in Toronto) was a landscape architect, horticulturalist and botanist best known for having designed the Jardin Botanique de Montreal. He was also its first curator.

== Professional recognition ==
Teuscher won the 1953 AHS Professional Award from the American Horticultural Society, as well as the 1962 Liberty Hyde Bailey Award, and the American Public Gardens Association's 1978 Award for Merit. The genus of orchids Teuscheria is named for him.
