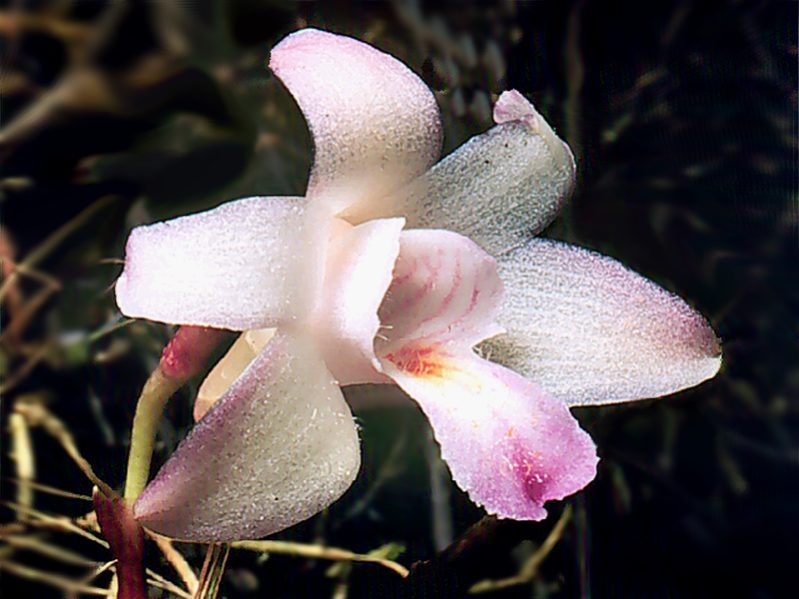
- Teuscheria pickiana

Scientific classification
- Kingdom: Plantae
- Clade: Tracheophytes
- Clade: Angiosperms
- Clade: Monocots
- Order: Asparagales
- Family: Orchidaceae
- Subfamily: Epidendroideae
- Tribe: Cymbidieae
- Subtribe: Maxillariinae
- Genus: Teuscheria; Garay

= Teuscheria =

Genus of orchids

Teuscheria is a genus of orchids native to southern Mexico, Central America and northern South America. The genus is named for Henry Teuscher, an award-winning landscape artist and horticulturalist.

Species accepted as of June 2014:

- Teuscheria archilae Chiron & Szlach. Guatemala
- Teuscheria cornucopia Garay - Ecuador
- Teuscheria desireei Archila - Guatemala
- Teuscheria dodsonii Dressler - Ecuador
- Teuscheria elegans Garay - Colombia
- Teuscheria guatemalensis Archila, Chiron & Szlach. - Guatemala
- Teuscheria horichiana Jenny & Braem - Costa Rica
- Teuscheria integrilabia Dodson - Ecuador
- Teuscheria pickiana (Schltr.) Garay - Mexico (Oaxaca, Chiapas) to Ecuador
- Teuscheria wageneri (Rchb.f.) Garay - Costa Rica to W. Colombia, Venezuela to NE. Ecuador

Of these species, three were described from Guatemala in 2013. These are T. archilae, T. desireei and T. guatemalensis. According to the protologue, T. archilae and T. guatemalensis occur in the wild in Guatemala, while the type and the description of T. desireei were based on material cultivated in Guatemala but probably native to Venezuela.
