= Îlot-Trafalgar-Gleneagles =

Coordinates: 45°29′41.89″N 73°35′41.4″W

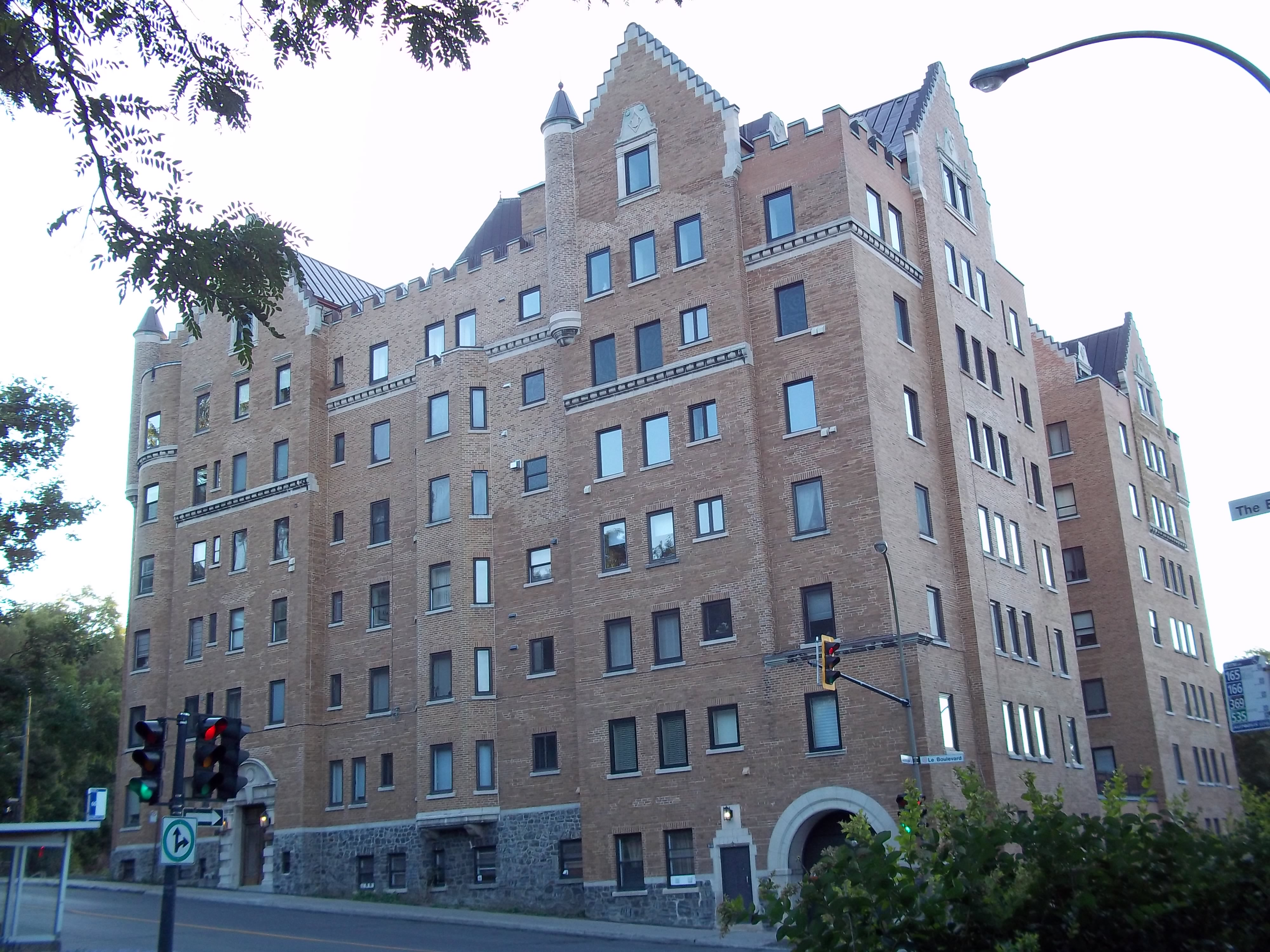
Trafalgar Building

The Îlot-Trafalgar-Gleneagles is a historic block in Montreal, Quebec, Canada, located on Côte-des-Neiges Road, on the west slope of Mount Royal.

Recognized in 2002 as a historic site by the Quebec government's Répertoire du patrimoine culturel du Québec, the area features four buildings: The Gleneagles, a Scottish Baronial building completed by architects Ross and Macdonald in 1929; the Château Style Trafalgar Building, built in 1931, with seven to twelve stories; and the Thompson (1907) and Sparrow (1910) houses.

At the time of their 2002 historic designation, the Thompson and Sparrow residences had been facing demolition. A plan by Canderel Corporation to build a 10-story tower on the site of the homes was blocked by the Quebec government just days before then-mayor Pierre Bourque had been set to approve the plan. In addition to the historic classification of the Îlot-Trafalgar-Gleneagles, the provincial government's Commission des biens culturels du Québec also worked with the city to extend the perimeter of Mount Royal's protected area to include the site.

== The Gleneagles ==
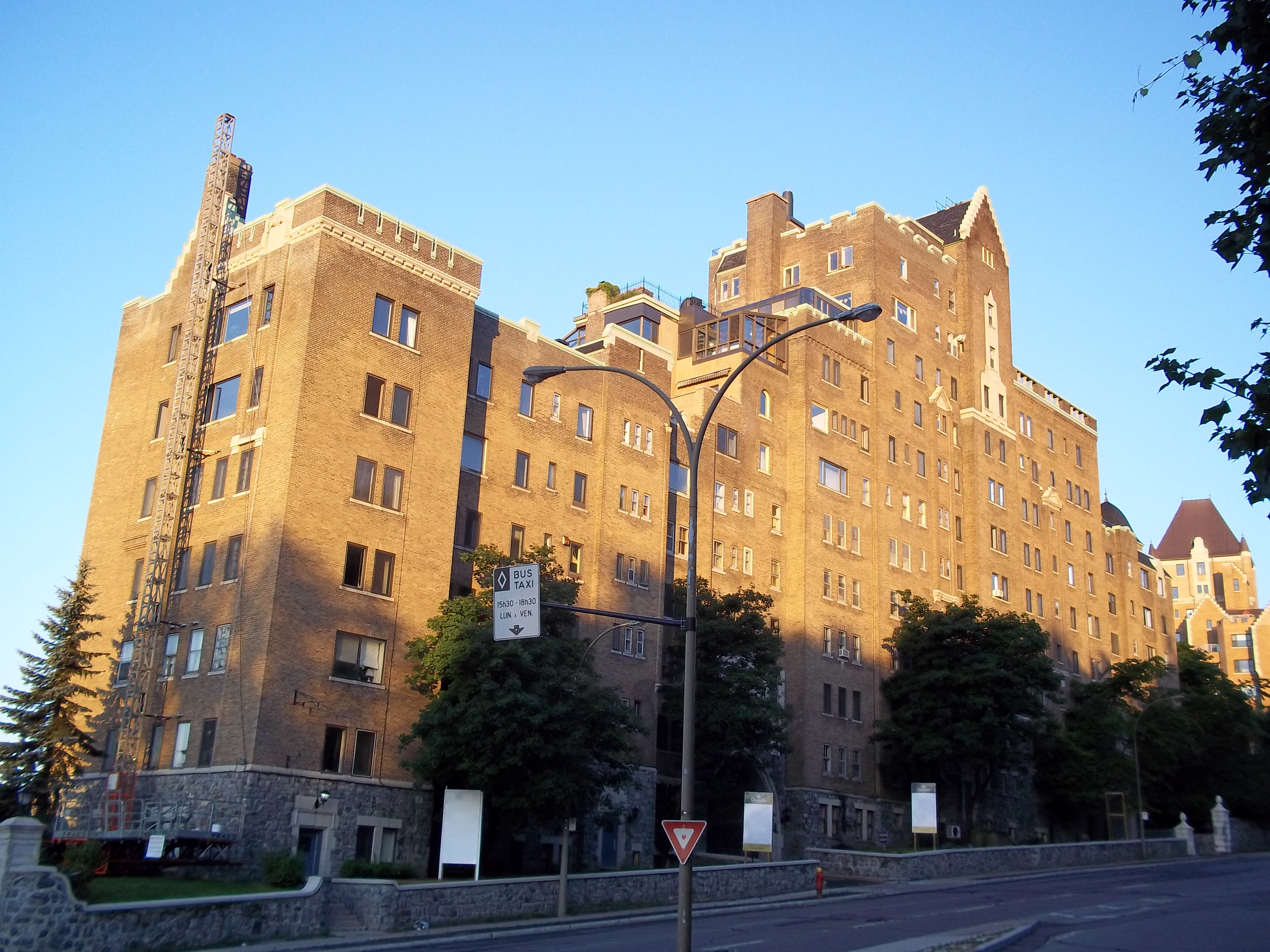
The Gleneagles, with Trafalgar at rear

The Gleneagles is situated at 3940-3946 Côte-des-Neiges Road, with a height ranging from six to thirteen floors, and was built between 1929 and 1930. It is situated on land sold by the Sulpicians in 1929 to contractor Frederick Walter Dakin. The same year, the land was acquired by the company Investors Development Co. Limited, then transferred to Gleneagles Investment Co. Limited. This same company owned the Gleneagles from 1929 until 1987, when the building was sold to the Blason real estate company, and subsequently changed from apartments to condos. Its exterior walls are covered in dark brown brick, with its upper floors are crowned with crow-stepped gables, parapets and balustrades.
