= Société d'astronomie de Montréal =

Canadian astronomy club

The Société d'astronomie de Montréal (Montreal Astronomy Society) is an astronomy club. It was founded in 1968 after the Montreal French Centre of the Royal Astronomical Society of Canada (founded in 1947) obtained a provincial charter.

For many years, it was the largest French-language astronomy club in Quebec, until the mid-1980s, when many other clubs in the Greater Montreal area started gaining members.

The Société has published for many years an Annuaire astronomique, an ephemeris book. Its members were also being offered telescope mirror polishing courses, in the Montreal Botanical Gardens meeting room, which was occupied by the Société until 1980, where it had to move.

Nowadays, the Société is based in the Villeray—Saint-Michel—Parc-Extension borough (district Saint-Michel). It organizes every year, together with the Club d'astronomie Orion de Saint-Timothée, the Concours annuel de fabricants de télescopes amateurs (CAFTA), a telescope-making contest.

== President List ==
- 1968 : Philippe Mailloux,
- 1969-70 : André Aird,
- 1971-72 : Jacques Lebrun,
- 1973 : Henri Simard,
- 1974-76 : Jacques Dumas,
- 1977-78 : Henri Coïa,
- 1979-80 : Lucien Coallier,
- 1981 : Maurice Provencher,
- 1982 : Lucien Coallier,
- 1983 : Rolland Lacroix,
- 1984-85 : Pierre Bastien,
- 1986-88 : Marc-André Gélinas,
- 1989-90 : Jean-Pierre Urbain,
- 1991 : Patrice Gérin-Roze,
- 1992 : Marc-André Gélinas,
- 1993 : Pierre Paquette,
- 1994 : Lorraine Morin,
- 1995 : Maurice Provencher,
- 1996-97 : Marc Fortin,
- 1998-99 : François Chevrefils,
- 2000-02 : Patrice Scattolin,
- 2003 : Bruno Beaupré,
- 2004-06 : Hugues Lacombe,
- 2007 : Michel Boucher
