= Marie-Anne-Marcelle Mallet =

Venerable Marie-Anne-Marcelle Mallet
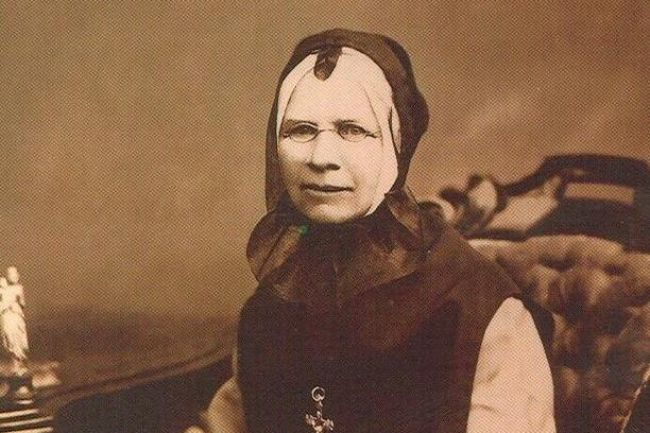
- Mallet c. 1866.

Religious
- Born: 26 March 1805; Côte-des-Neiges, Montréal, Canada
- Died: 9 April 1871 (aged 66); Québec, Canada
- Venerated in: Roman Catholic Church
- Attributes: Religious habit
- Patronage: Sisters of Charity of Québec

Marie-Anne-Marcelle Mallet (March 26, 1805 – April 9, 1871) was a Roman Catholic nun and founder of the Sisters of Charity of Quebec. Her surname also appears as Maillet or Maillé.

== Biography ==
Marie was born to Vital Mallet and Marguerite Sarrazin in Montreal, Lower Canada. Her father died when she was five and she spent the rest of her childhood living with an aunt and uncle in Lachine and in boarding with the Congregation of Notre Dame. Mallet joined the Sisters of Charity of the Hôpital Général of Montreal as a novice in 1824 and became a nun in 1826. During the 1847 typhus epidemic in Montreal, she assumed full responsibility of the hospital. In 1849, she was chosen to be the founder and mother superior for a new congregation at Quebec City. Mallet established a relief service for needy children. The Sisters also provided a home for orphan children, as well as aged and infirm people. They also operated boarding schools for girls and an out-patient service for the poor. As well, the Sisters of Charity took in new immigrants who had no place else to stay and people who lost their homes to fire.

The congregation went through a change in philosophy after adopting a new framework based on Jesuit order, replacing the earlier rule based on the Sulpician school. Mallet was not re-elected as mother superior in an election held in 1866 and returned to live life as a simple nun. She died in Quebec City on Easter Sunday at the age of 66 after suffering from cancer for two years.

She was declared venerable in January 2014.

The former convent of the Sisters of Charity of Quebec, known as the Maison Mère-Mallet, has been designated a Quebec heritage building. The Institut Mallet has been established with the aim of promoting a culture of philanthropy in Quebec. A research chair has been established in her name at Laval University to study the impact of philanthropy on society.
