= Butterflies Go Free =

Coordinates: 45°33′26.0″N 73°33′24.5″W

Butterflies Go Free video

Butterflies Go Free (French: Papillons en liberté) is an annual exhibit at the Jardin Botanique de Montreal, featuring thousands of live tropical butterflies and moths released in the Grande Serre of the exhibition greenhouses. The insects are purchased in caterpillar and egg form from sustainable butterfly farms.

The exhibit, which first shown in 1997, is presented each year from February to April.

The event features a selection of the largest butterflies found globally. One such example is the Attacus atlas, also known as the Cobra moth, which boasts an impressive wingspan reaching a sizeable 12 inches.
