= Côte-des-Neiges station =

Montreal Metro station

Côte-des-Neiges
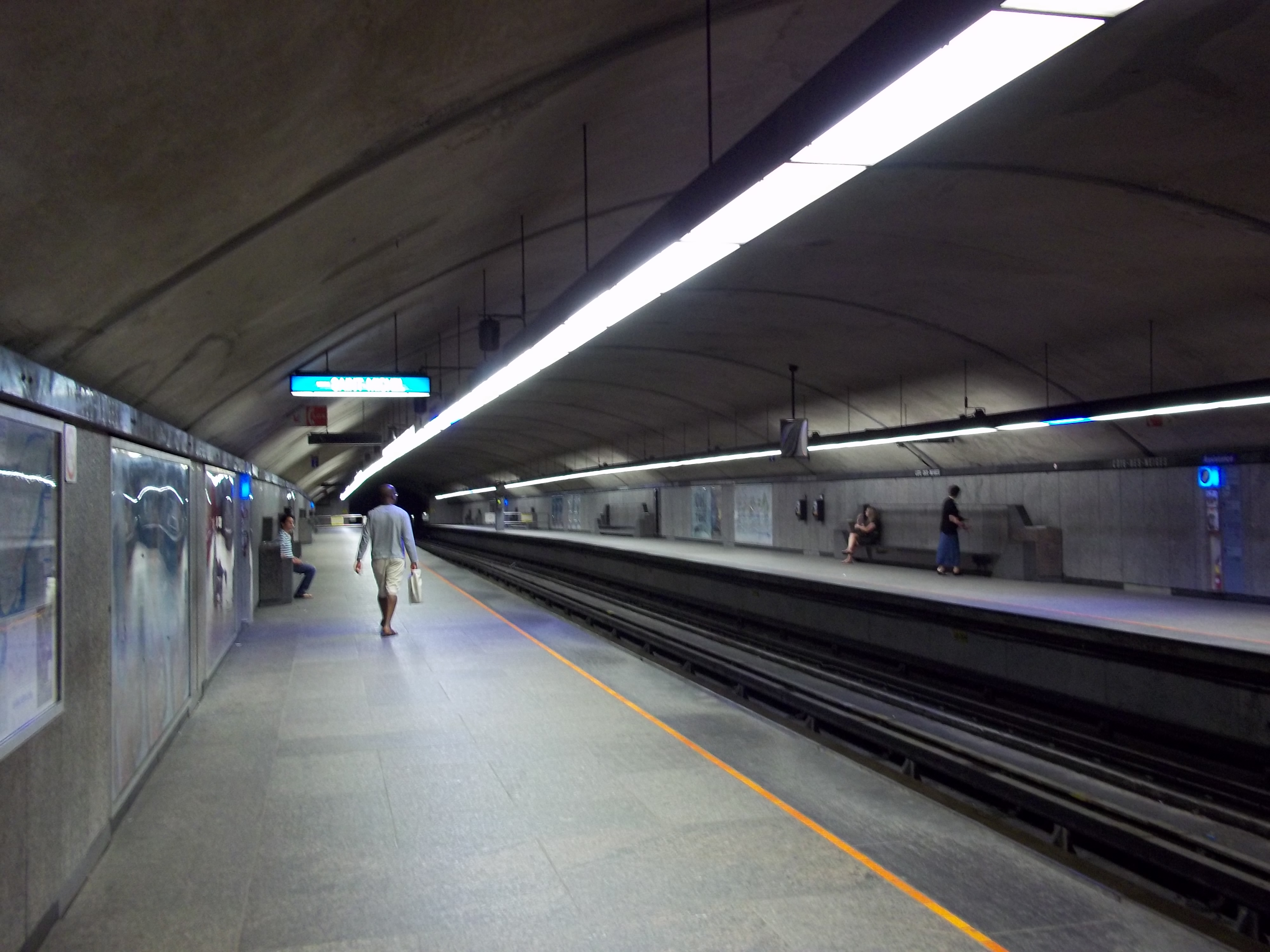

General information
- Location: 5316/5351, chemin de la Côte-des-Neiges; Montreal, Quebec H3T 1Y2; Canada
- Coordinates: 45°29′48″N 73°37′24″W
- Operator: Société de transport de Montréal
- Platforms: 2 side platforms
- Tracks: 2
- Connections: STM bus

Construction
- Depth: 17.6 metres (57 feet 9 inches), 24th deepest
- Accessible: No
- Architect: Tétreault, Parent, Languedoc

Other information
- Fare zone: ARTM: A

History
- Opened: 4 January 1988

Passengers
- 2024: 3,810,034 ▲8.53%
- Rank: 25 of 68

Services
Preceding station	Montreal Metro	Following station
Snowdon Terminus	Blue Line	Université-de-Montréal toward Saint-Michel
Location

Côte-des-Neiges station (French pronunciation: [kot de nɛʒ]) is a Montreal Metro station in Montreal, Quebec, Canada. It is operated by the Société de transport de Montréal (STM) and serves the Blue Line. It is located in the Côte-des-Neiges area of the borough of Côte-des-Neiges–Notre-Dame-de-Grâce. It opened in 1988.

== Overview ==
It is a normal side platform station built in tunnel. A ticket hall, also in tunnel, diverges to two entrances, one on each side of Ch. de la Côte-des-Neiges. The western entrance is housed in an imposing building containing a stained glass window by Claude Bettinger, while the eastern one is integrated into another building and includes a suite of sculptures by Bernard Chaudron. A second stained-glass mural by Bettinger is found in the transept leading to the platforms.

In 2022, the STM's Universal Accessibility Report noted that design work to make the station accessible was underway.

== Origin of name ==
Côte-des-Neiges station takes its name from the road on which it lies: Côte-des-Neiges Road.

Côte-des-Neiges Road takes its name from the settlement originally on this location, the Village of Côte-des-Neiges, which was created in 1862, and annexed by Montreal in two parts in 1908 and 1910.

The name for the area, Côte de Notre-Dame des Neiges (Our Lady of the Snows Hill), dates from the early 18th century. The name lives on in the church and the school in the centre of the former village.

== Connecting bus routes ==
Société de transport de Montréal
No.	Route	Connects to	Service times / notes
11	Parc du Mont-Royal	Mont-Royal	Daily Occasional departures to Ridgewood throughout the day. All departures serve Ridgewood after 9:30 PM.
165	Côte-des-Neiges	Ville-de-Mont-Royal; Guy-Concordia	Daily
369 ☾	Côte-des-Neiges	Namur; Guy-Concordia; Atwater	Night service

== Nearby points of interest ==
- St. Mary's Hospital
- Maison de la culture Côte-des-Neiges
- Centre communautaire de la Côte-des-Neiges
- École Notre-Dame-des-Neiges
- Église Notre-Dame-des-Neiges
- Collège Notre-Dame du Sacré-Coeur
- Saint Joseph's Oratory
- Notre Dame des Neiges Cemetery
- Université de Montréal (Jean-Brillant building)
  - École des hautes études commerciales
    (HEC) (Decelles building)
- Collège Jean-de-Brébeuf
- Hôpital Sainte-Justine
- Jewish General Hospital
