= Ernest Rouleau =

Canadian botanist (1916–1991)

Ernest Rouleau (1916–1991) was a Canadian botanist specialist of Eastern Canada flora, in particular that of Newfoundland. He studied under Marie-Victorin, of which he published the second, enlarged and revised edition of the Flore laurentienne and under Fernald, whose Gray's Manual of Botany (8th edition) he also revised. His Atlas of the vascular plants of the island of Newfoundland and of the islands of Saint-Pierre-et-Miquelon is the only comprehensive flora of either areas.

He died in 1991 of pneumonia.
