= Boisé-des-Muir Ecological Reserve =

Ecological reserve in Canada

Coordinates: 45.0847°N 74.1167°W

- IUCN category Ia (strict nature reserve)
- Interactive map of Boisé-des-Muir Ecological Reserve
- Location: Hinchinbrooke, Le Haut-Saint-Laurent Regional County Municipality, Québec, Canada
- Established: 1995

Boisé-des-Muir Ecological Reserve is an ecological reserve of Quebec, Canada. It was established in 1995.
