= Flore laurentienne =

Flore laurentienne by Marie-Victorin, science

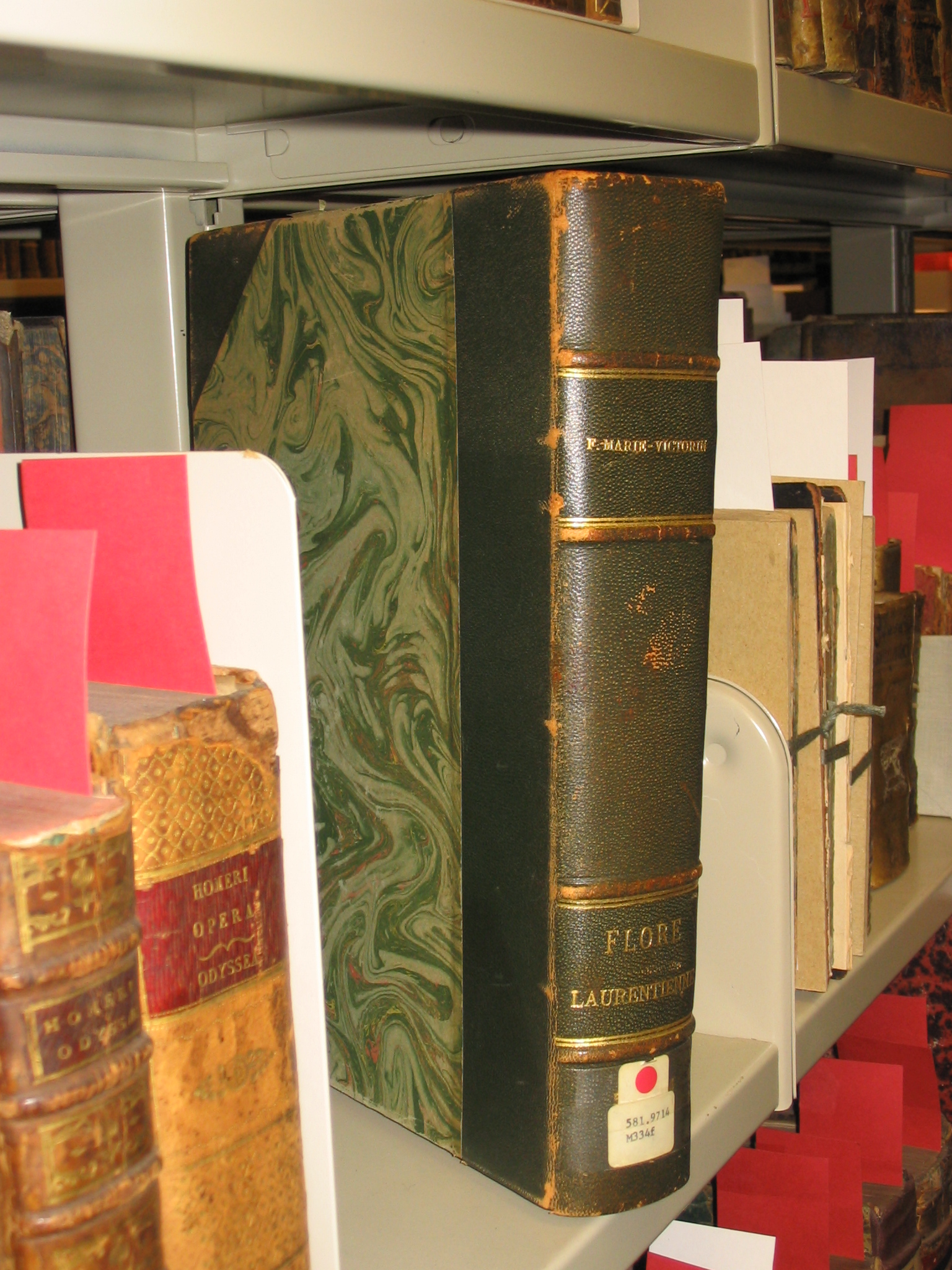
- Rare books and special collections, pavillon Thérèse-Casgrain, Université du Québec à Montréal
- Author: Bro. Marie-Victorin (1885-1944)
- Original title: Flore laurentienne
- Illustrator: Bro. Alexandre Blouin (1892-1987)
- Language: French
- Genre: Botany
- Publisher: Bros. of the Christian Schools
- Publication date: 1935
- Publication place: Quebec, Canada
- Media type: Scientific work
- Pages: 925
- ISBN: 0-8405-0018-1

Flore laurentienne (The Laurentian Flora En) by Marie-Victorin Bro. (Conrad Kirouac), is the scientific inventory of vascular plant resources growing spontaneously in the St. Lawrence River valley, in Quebec, Canada.

First published by the Bros. of the Christian Schools in 1935, the manual lists and describes 1568 species of Pteridophytes, Gymnosperms, Angiosperms, plants illustrated by Bro. Alexandre Blouin.

== History ==
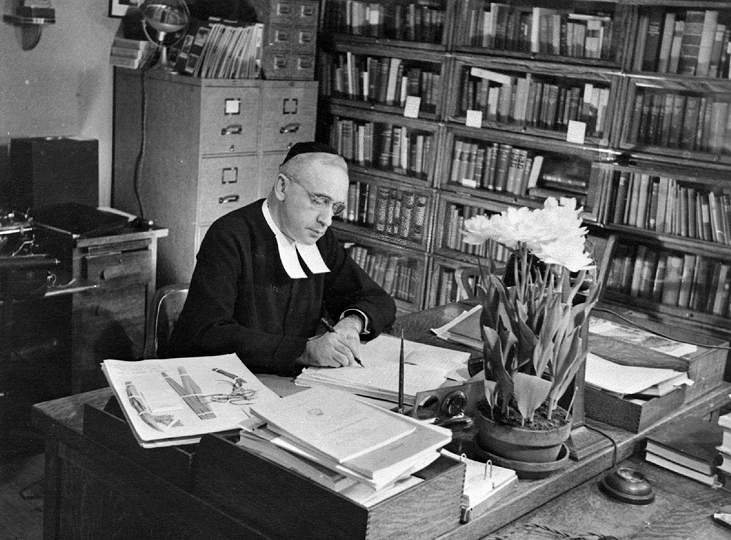
Bro. Marie-Victorin in his office, (La Presse, 30 September 1944)

The Flore laurentienne is the fruit of thirty years of study, research, gathering, plant collecting, and classification of thousands of specimens. In 1935, in the midst of an economic crisis, it took the energy, charisma and sense of organization of Marie-Victorin, assisted by his collaborators, to bring the manuscript to the presses of the Brothers of the Christian Schools.

From its launch on April 3, 1935, at the Viger Hotel in Montreal, the Flore laurentienne was acclaimed as the bible of French-Canadian naturalists.

== Flore laurentienne divisions ==
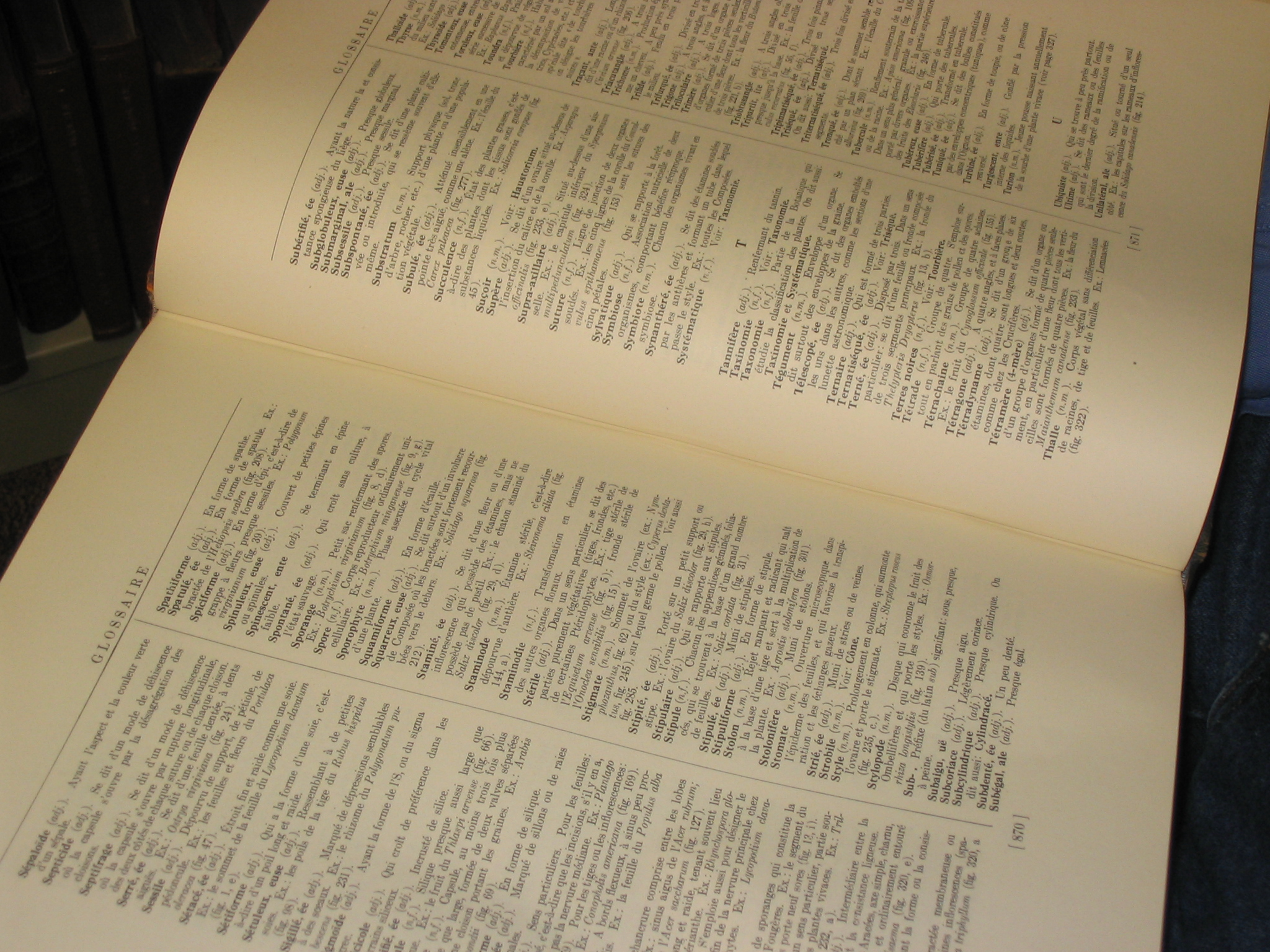
Flore laurentienne 1935, glossary, pp. 870, 871

Preface — Historical and bibliographical summary of Laurentian botany — General outline — Synopsis of systematic groups — Artificial key to plants of Quebec — Pteridophytes — Spermatophytes — Gymnosperms — Angiosperms — Dicotyls — Monocotyls — Glossary — Abbreviations of author names — Alphabetical index (Marie-Victorin, p. 4, 1935)

== Editions ==
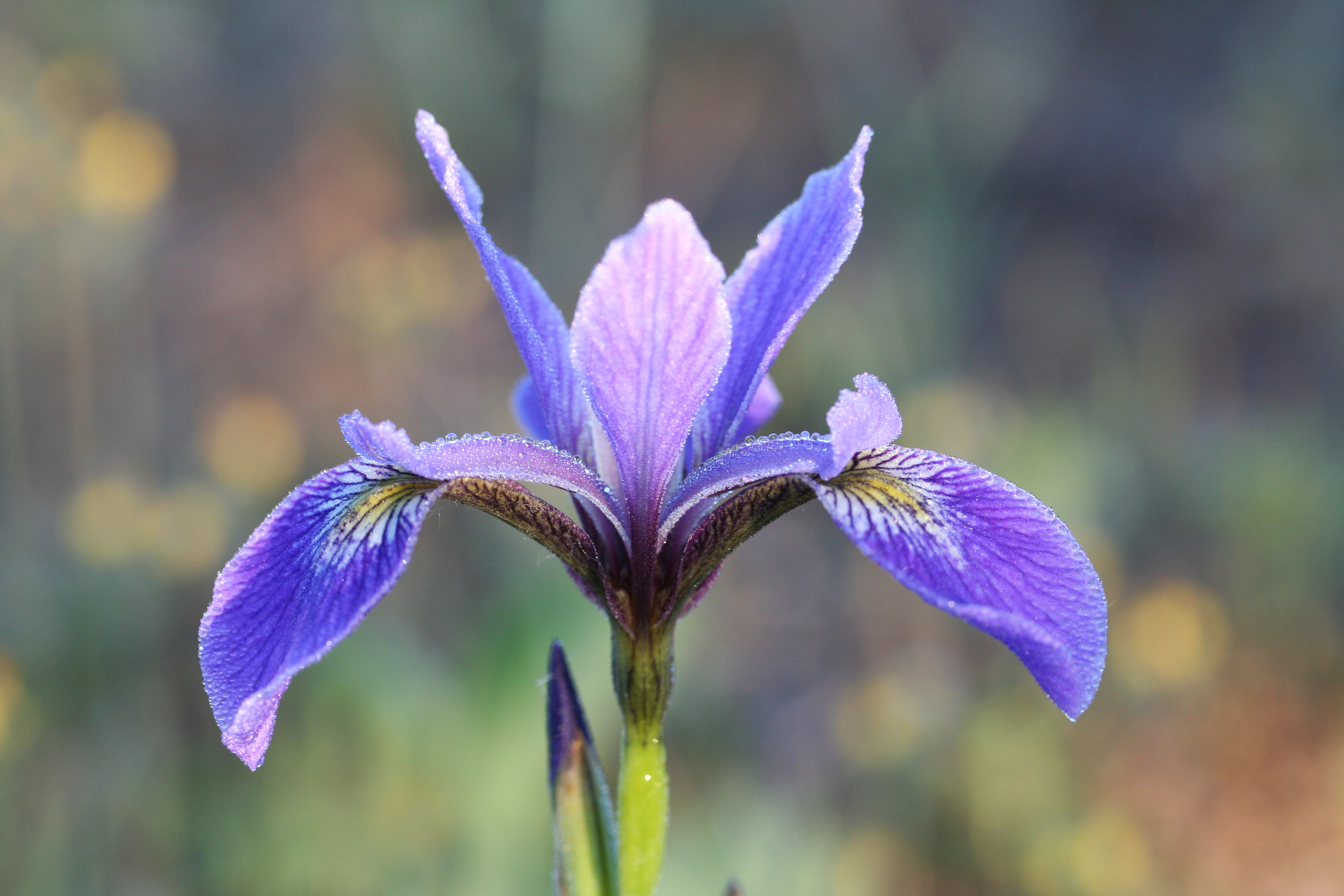
Iris versicolor L., home page florelaurentienne.com

Recent publications are still available in bookstores, educational institutions, public libraries and on line, the work published for the first time in 1935, in large format, has undergone several reissues:

- Second edition, completely revised and updated by Ernest Rouleau (1916-1991), published in September 1964, printed on Bible paper and in a reduced format;
- Third edition, updated and annotated by Luc Brouillet, Stuart G. Hay and Isabelle Goulet, published in October 1995, reprinted in 2002;
- Digital edition, florelaurentienne.com, on line, updated, annotated, continuously active since 2001.

Overview of plants studied

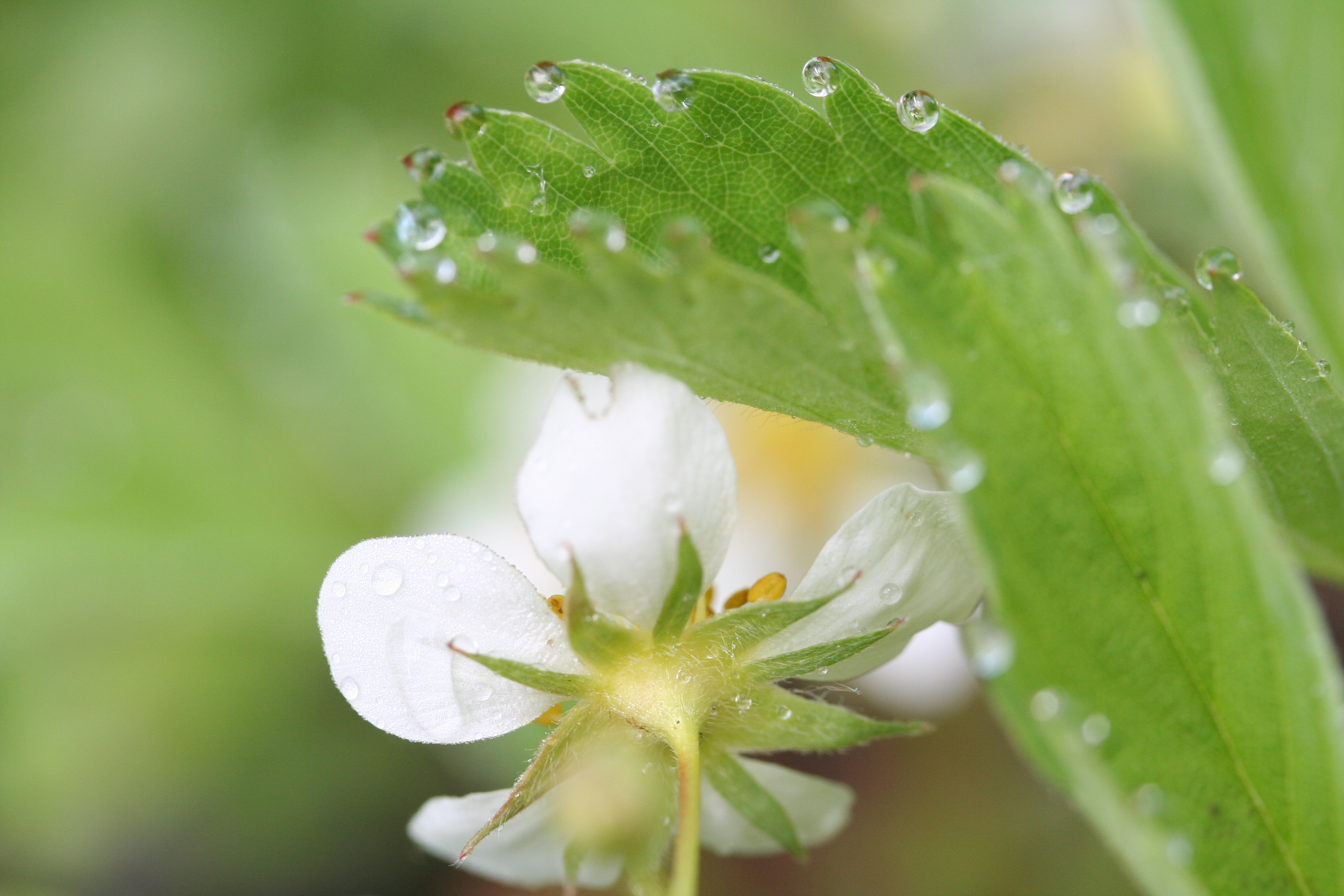
Fragaria virginiana Mill.

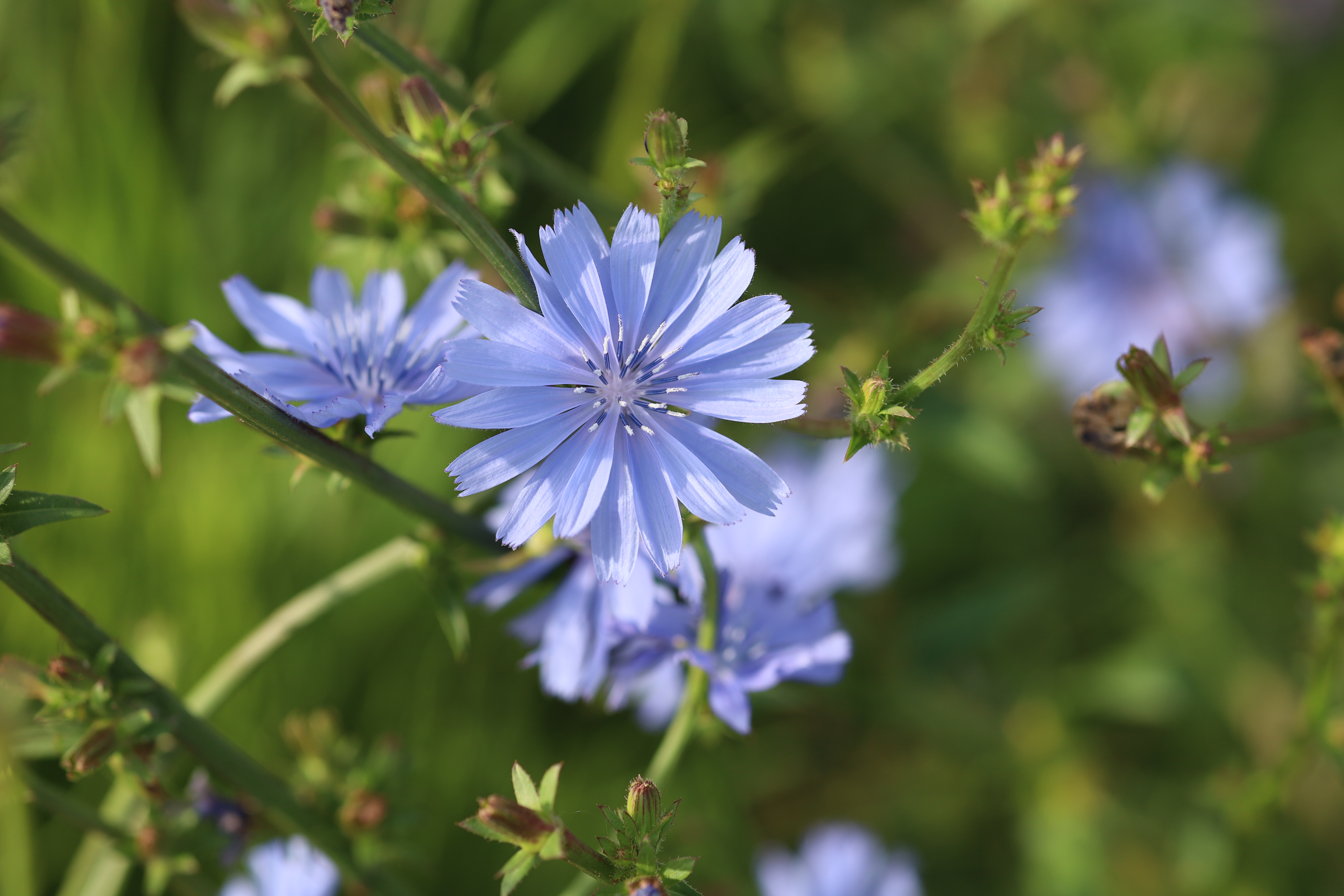
Cichorium intybus L.

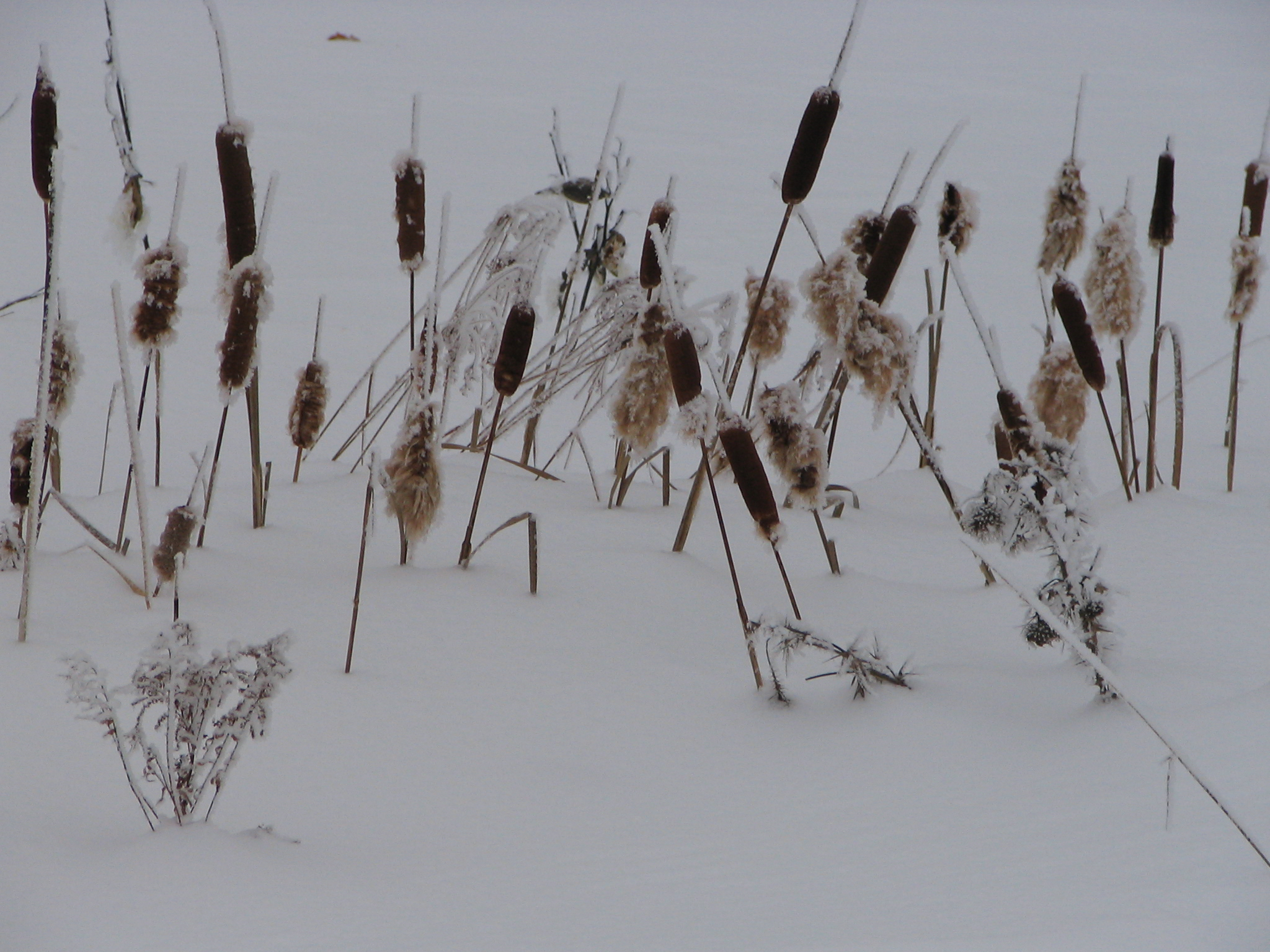
Typha latifolia L.

== Collaborators ==
To carry out his work, Bro. Marie-Victorin surrounded himself with several collaborators, some of whom were his students. At the forefront of these is Bro. Alexandre [Blouin] (1892-1987), the author of the 2800 illustrations of the Flora, and whose name appears on the title page of the work. Jacques Rousseau, who would later become a botanist and ethnologist of international reputation is the author of the " artificial key of Quebec plants ”, which, by avoiding overly technical elements and using the simplest and easiest to perceive characters, « allows even beginners and amateurs to orient themselves and arrive at the desired identification ». For his part, Jules Brunel, Marie-Victorin's assistant at the Montreal Botanical Institute, was responsible for preparing the manuscripts, checking the documentation and correcting the proofs. The last two mentioned also wrote the sections dealing with some of the more contentious genres.

The author also addresses special thanks to other people, including Bro. Rolland-Germain, his collaborator for thirty years, Marcelle Gauvreau, librarian of the Botanical Institute, and Émile Jacques, curator of the herbarium of this institution.

== Reception ==
... The publication of the first edition of Flore laurentienne was an event awaited by Quebec society at the time; it is announced on the front page of the daily Le Devoir. Biologist Georges Préfontaine wrote in Le Devoir: “A new monument, luminous and imperishable, stands today in the firmament of American botanical science.” The literary critic Pierre Daviault, in Le Droit, is equally complimentary:

. . . This book, Flore Laurentienne, is not the complete flora of Quebec within its current political limits. Even less is it the definitive critical flora of our vast province. The critical and complete flora of Quebec is a long-term work, undoubtedly begun, but whose completion will only be possible when the current generation of botanists has completed the exploration of the territory, drawn up the inventory, and worked out a large number of questions of detail.

— Marie-Victorin, Preface to the first edition, April 3, 1935

The same year the flora was published, the gold medal from the Provancher Society of Natural History of Canada was awarded to Marie-Victorin for its publication.

Overview of plants studied

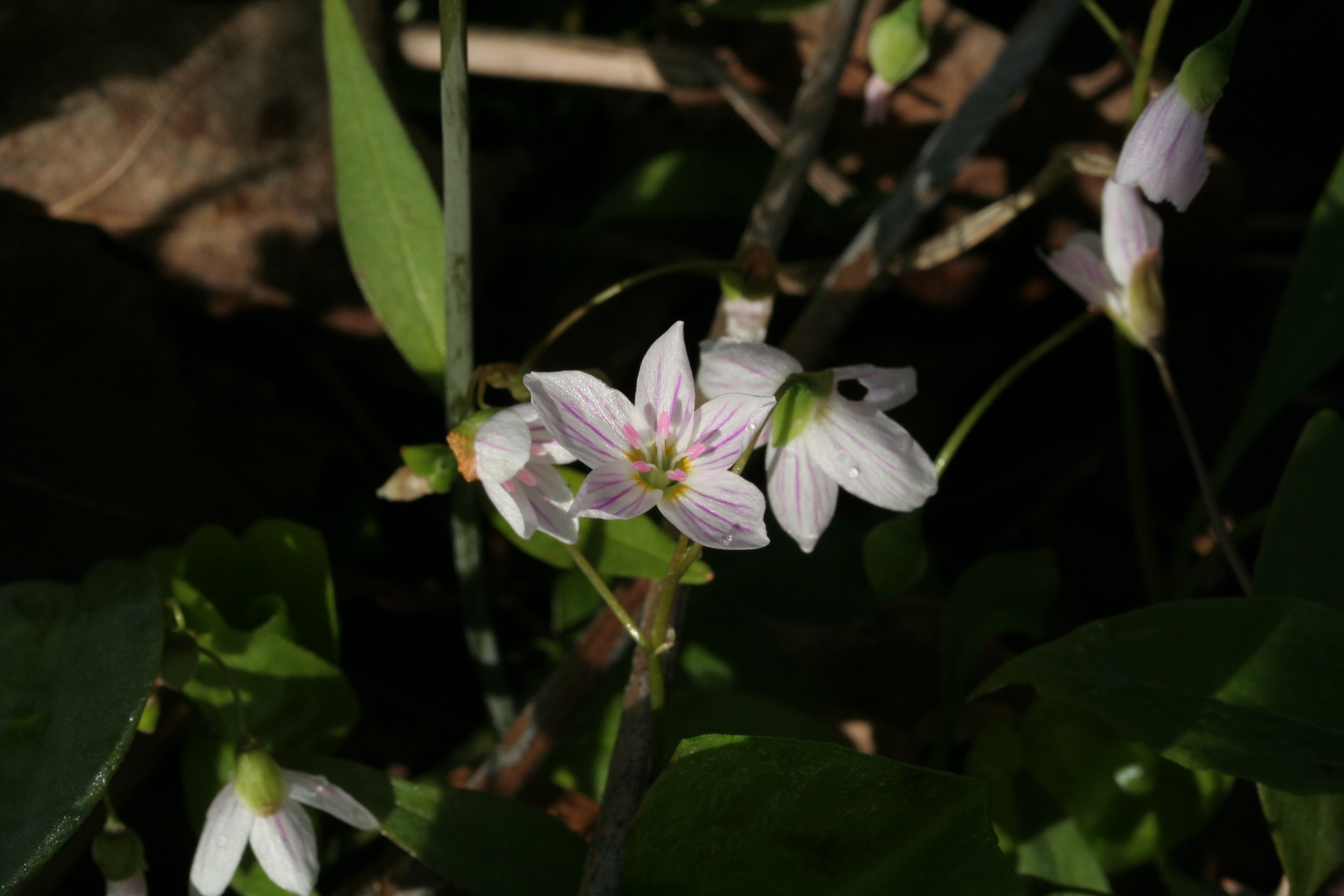
Claytonia caroliniana Michx. — Claytonie de Caroline. — (Spring beauty).

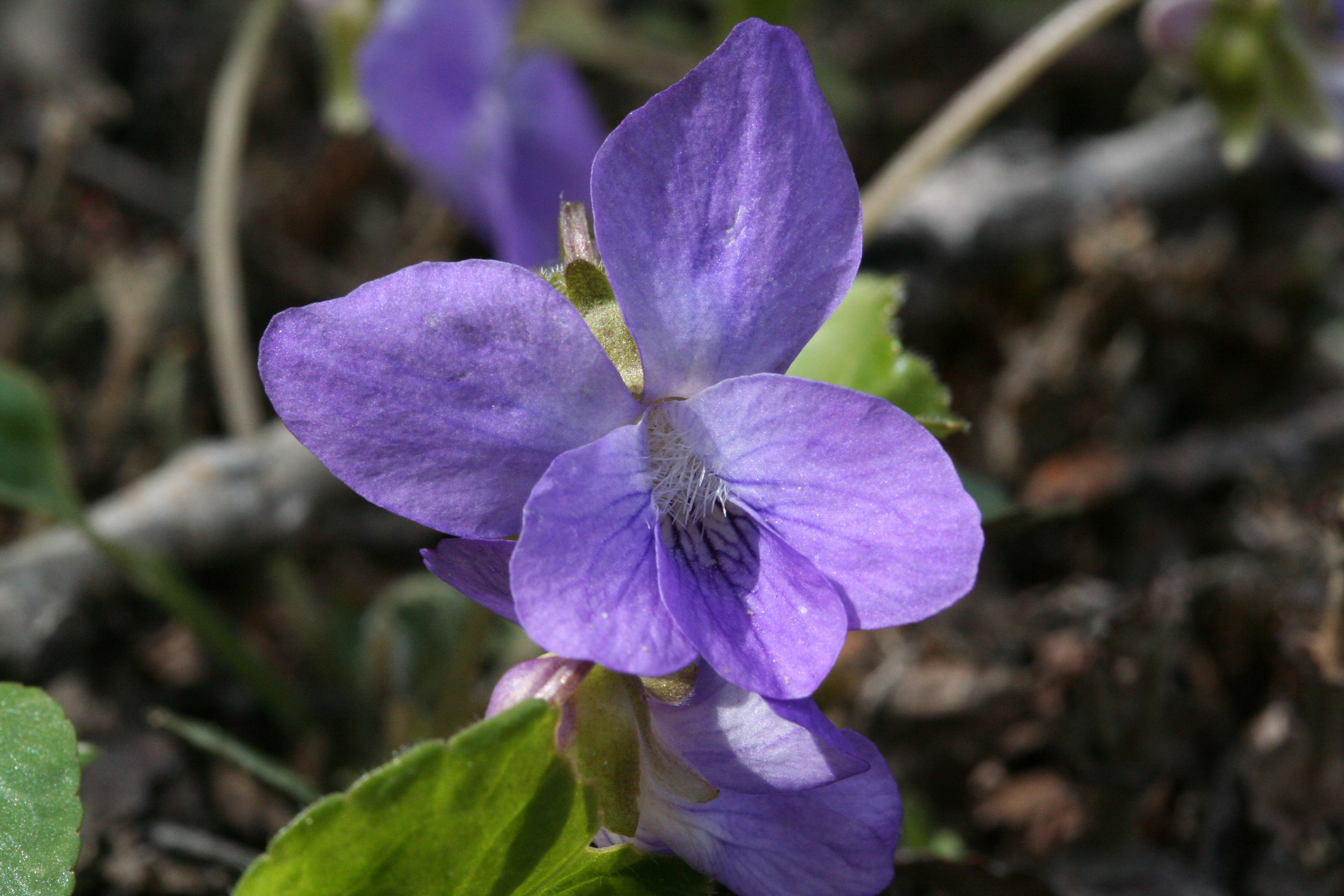
Viola sororia Willd. (syn.Viola septentrionalis). — Violette septentrionale. — (Northern blue violet).

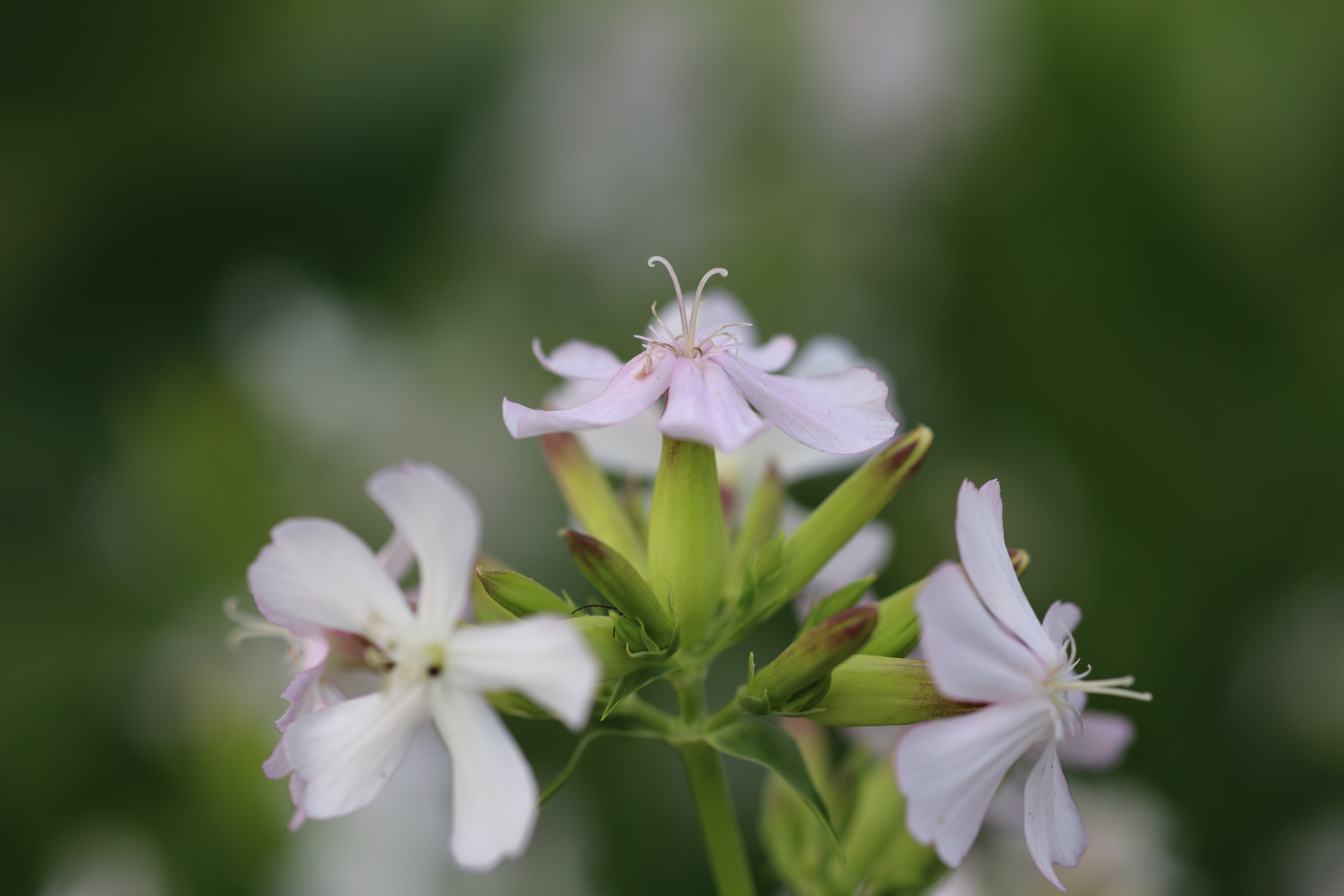
Saponaria officinalis L. — Saponaire officinale. — Herbe à savon. — (Soapwort).

== Culture ==
The Flore laurentienne is mentioned several times in Réjean Ducharme's novel, L’Hiver de force.
