= Côte-des-Neiges =

- Neighbourhood
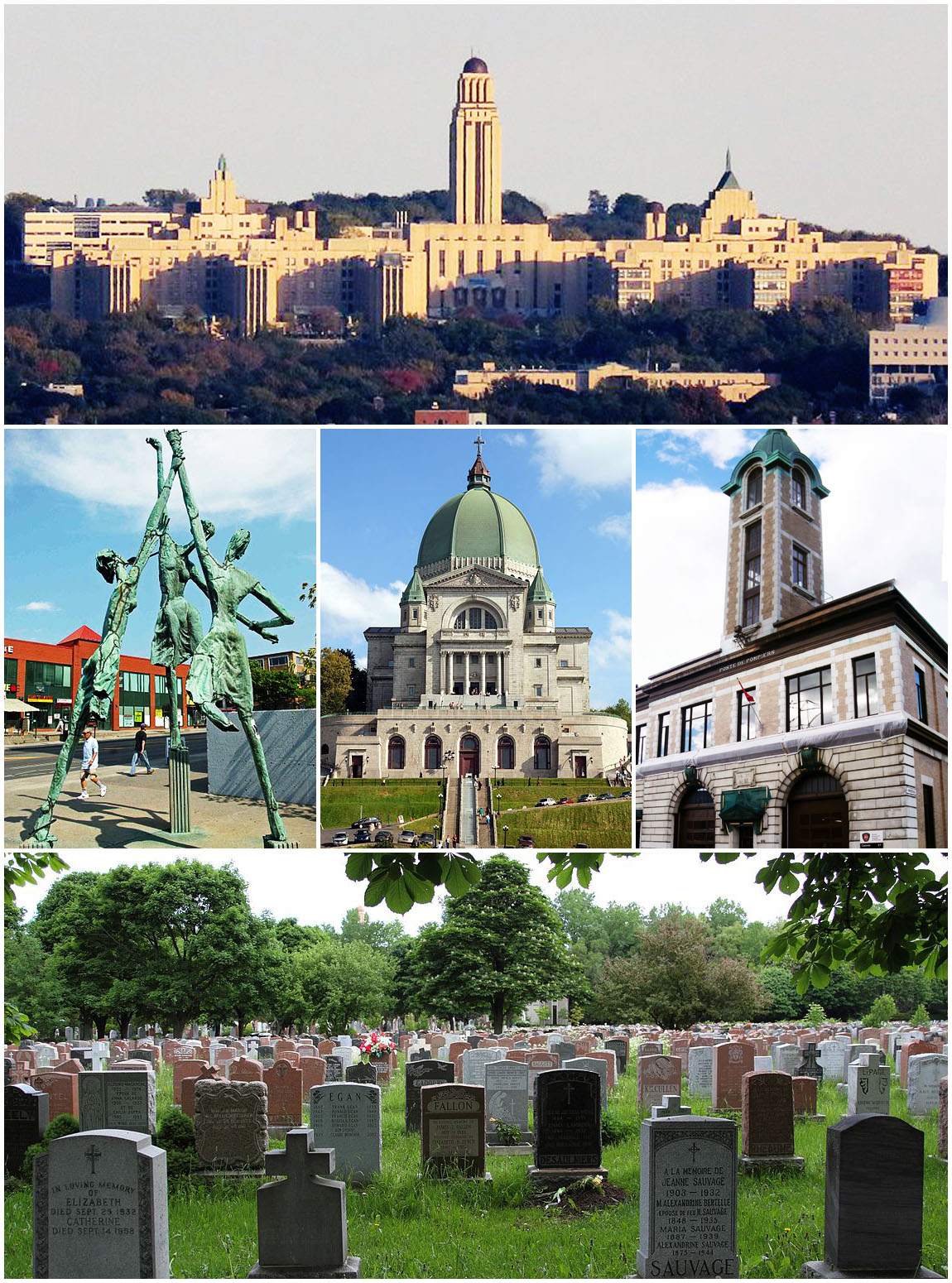

- Location of Côte-des-Neiges in Montreal
- Coordinates: 45.47675°N 73.61432°W
- Country: Canada
- Province: Quebec
- City: Montreal
- Borough: Côte-des-Neiges–Notre-Dame-de-Grâce
- Established: 1868
- Merged: 1908, 1910

Area
  - Land: 11.6 km^{2} (4.5 sq mi)

Population (2013)
  - Total: 97,803
  - Density: 8,462.1/km^{2} (21,917/sq mi)
- Postal Code: H3S, H3T, H3V, H3W
- Area codes: 514, 438

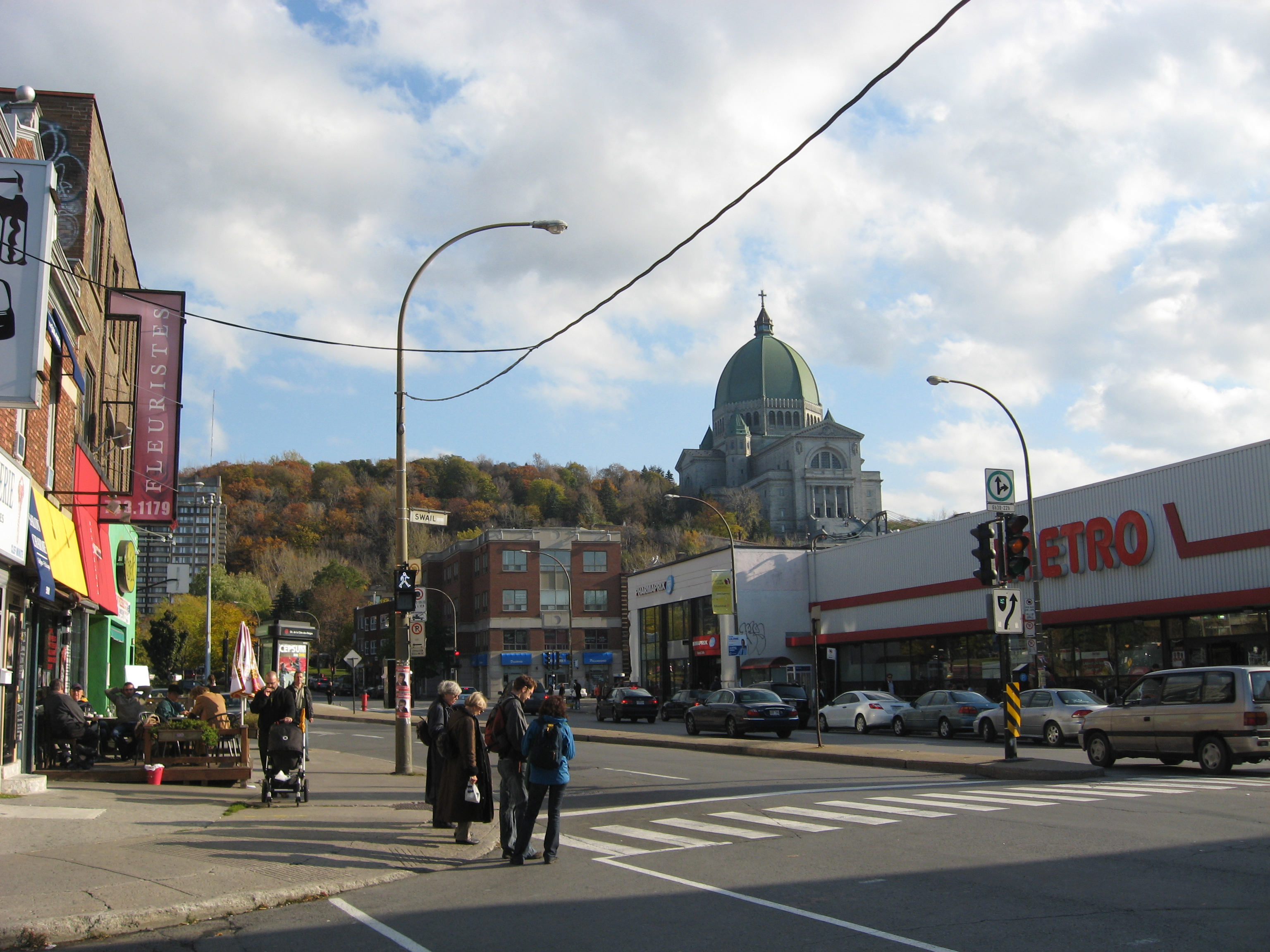
Chemin de la Côte-des-Neiges in Côte-des-Neiges

Côte-des-Neiges (French pronunciation: [kot de nɛːʒ], locally [koʊ̯t de naɪ̯ʒ]) is a neighbourhood of Montreal, Quebec, Canada. It is located at the geographic centre of the Island of Montreal on the western slope of Mount Royal and is part of the borough of Côte-des-Neiges–Notre-Dame-de-Grâce.

== History ==
Historically, the original settlement, the Village of Côte-des-Neiges, was founded in 1862 and annexed by Montreal in two parts in 1908 and 1910. In 1876, land owner and farmer James Swail began residential subdivisions on the eastern side of Decelles Avenue. In 1906, a large housing development was started in the area, called Northmount Heights, built by developer Northmount Land Company. Much of this area has been expropriated by the Université de Montréal.

Geographically it was bordered by Decelles Avenue to the north east and the Notre Dame des Neiges Cemetery to the south east, Westmount to the southwest and situated on the confluence of Côte-des-Neiges Road and Queen Mary Road. It was one of the last areas of the city of Montreal to be developed and urbanized. Up until World War II it remained a village surrounded by working farms to the north and west. A ski hill to the south near present-day Ridgewood Avenue at the foot of the mountain and present day Saint Joseph's Oratory, was once used regularly by the Montreal Ski Club into the 1940s.

Part of the neighbourhood’s Black anglophone population traces its roots to the 1960s, when families displaced from Little Burgundy resettled in Côte‑des‑Neiges.

Community oral histories recall that several Black families lived in Côte‑des‑Neiges during the mid‑20th century, including the Chambers, Fields, Whites, Smiths, Clarks, Tynes, and Martins (and more). Black families were also present in Verdun, Ville‑Émard, Côte‑Saint‑Paul, the South Shore, and the West Island, reflecting the broader dispersion of Montreal’s Black community beyond Little Burgundy. The earliest members of the community included men who came from the USA, Atlantic Canada, and a few from the Caribbean, who arrived to work on the railroad.

On June 22, 2026, a shooting attack occurred in which three people were killed: the perpetrator, a civilian, and a police officer. Two other people were wounded.

== Demographics ==
Today, the neighbourhood has a large immigrant and student population, and is one of the most densely populated and ethnically diverse neighbourhoods in Canada. With over 100 different ethnic communities, predominantly: Canadian, Filipino, West Indian (Black Canadians), South Asian (Tamils and Bengalis), Jewish, Latin American, Iranian, Chinese, Arab, Vietnamese and most recently Eastern European and African. It is one of the few Montreal neighbourhoods where neither the French nor English language dominate. Both national languages are spoken equally, along with many others by a high number of multilingual speakers.

The neighbourhood’s Black population includes people of African, Caribbean, Atlantic Canadian, and Afro-Indigenous heritage, reflecting the diverse histories of Black communities in Montreal.

== Education ==
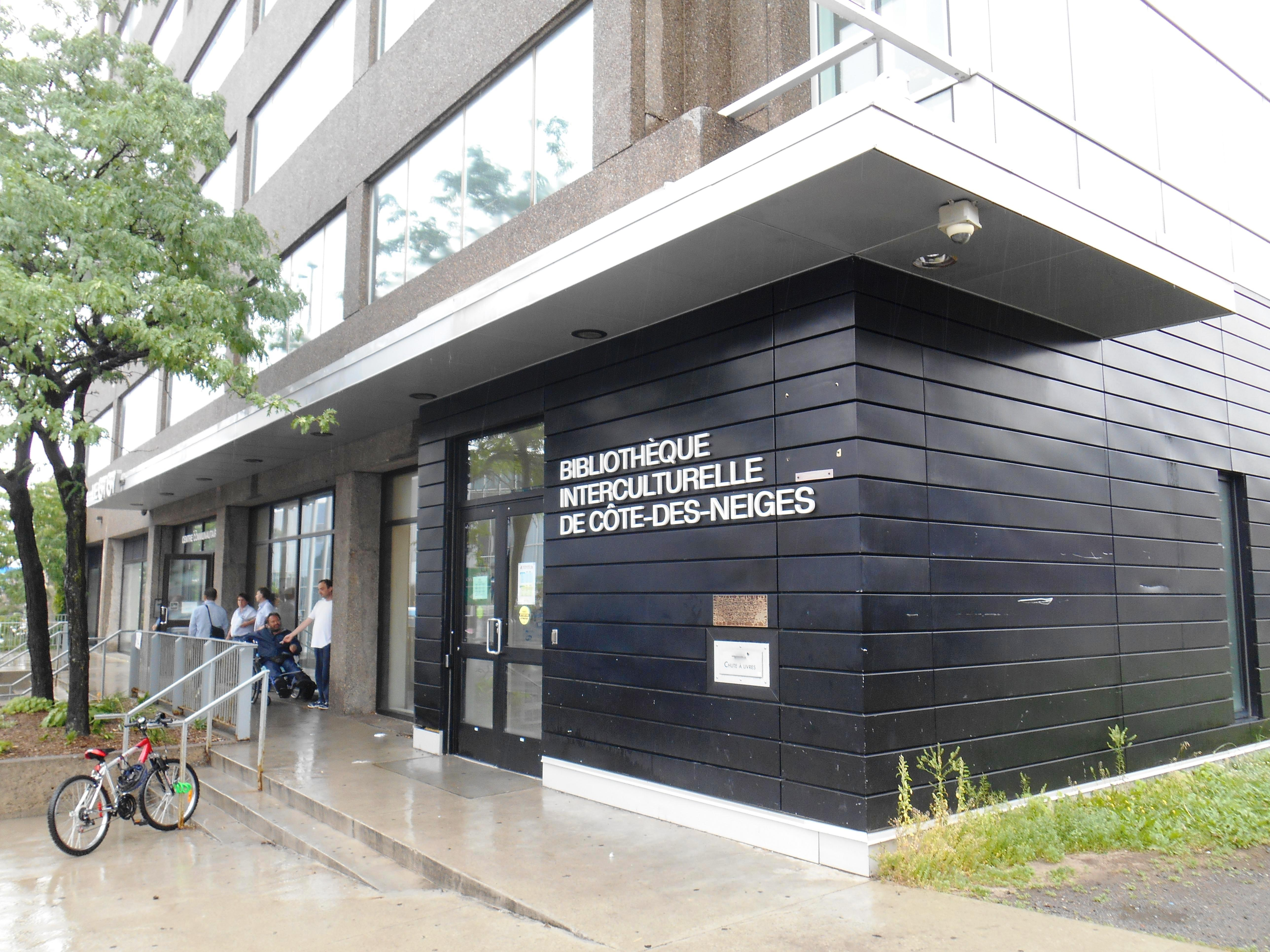
Bibliothèque interculturelle de Côte-des-Neiges

The Centre de services scolaire de Montréal (CSSDM) operates Francophone public schools. For instance:

- École primaire des Nations
- École primaire Félix-Leclerc
- École primaire Iona

The English Montreal School Board (EMSB) operates Anglophone public schools.

The Montreal Public Libraries Network operates the Côte-des-Neiges library and the Bibliothèque interculturelle.

The main campus of Université de Montréal and its two schools HÉC Montréal and Polytechnique Montréal are located within the neighbourhood.

== Points of interest ==
The most notable institutions in Côte-des-Neiges are Université de Montréal, Collège Jean-de-Brébeuf, Saint-Justine's Hospital, the Jewish General Hospital, St. Mary's Hospital, Plaza Côte-des-Neiges, and Saint Joseph's Oratory (the large domed basilica, perched above the neighbourhood, which is by far its most important tourist attraction).

== Metro stations ==
- Orange Line
  - Snowdon
  - Côte-Sainte-Catherine
  - Plamondon
  - Namur
  - De la Savane
- Blue Line
  - Snowdon
  - Côte-des-Neiges
  - Université-de-Montréal
  - Édouard-Montpetit

== Notable people ==
- André Bouchard - environmentalist, grew up in Côte-des-Neiges
- Normand Brathwaite - actor and comedian, born in Côte-des-Neiges
- Napoléon Charbonneau - lawyer, lived in Côte-des-Neiges
- John Hamilton Fulton - banker, born in Côte-des-Neiges
- Kris Joseph - basketball player, grew up in Côte-des-Neiges
- Nomadic Massive - Hip Hop music group, some of its nembers were born or raised in Côte-des-Neiges while many others reside or resided in the area. The band had its headquarters in the neighborhood and have also worked within the community for many years and helped develop local artists. They often made reference to Côte-des-Neiges in their music, notably on Lou Piensa's song "Medina to Vezina" where he says "Côte-des-Neiges remains to some so foreign/a place where tri-lingualism is the norm".
- Alexander Julien - musician, member of Vision Eternel, born in Côte-des-Neiges
- Marie-Anne-Marcelle Mallet - nun, born in Côte-des-Neiges
- David Ross McCord - lawyer, lived in Côte-des-Neiges
- Pierre Nadeau - journalist, grew up in Côte-des-Neiges
- Léa Roback - trade unionist, died in Côte-des-Neiges
- Sugar Sammy - comedian and actor, grew up in Côte-des-Neiges
- Justin Trudeau - politician, owned a home in Côte-des-Neiges until 2013
- Sophie Grégoire Trudeau - television host, owned a home in Côte-des-Neiges until 2013
- Xue Yiwei - writer, resident in Côte-des-Neiges
- Arthur Yale, politician, cofounder of Plateau-Mount Royal
