= Marie-Victorin Kirouac =

Canadian French botanist (1885–1944)

Bro. Marie-Victorin Kirouac, F.S.C.
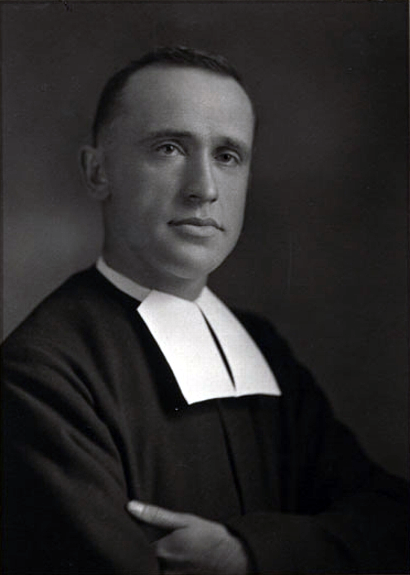
- Born: Joseph-Louis-Conrad Kirouac; April 3, 1885; Kingsey Falls, Quebec, Canada
- Died: July 15, 1944 (aged 59); Montreal, Quebec, Canada
- Resting place: Notre Dame des Neiges Cemetery
- Occupations: Religious brother, teacher and botanist

Brother Marie-Victorin, F.S.C. (French pronunciation: [maʁi viktɔʁɛ̃]; April 3, 1885 – July 15, 1944), was a Canadian member of Brothers of the Christian Schools and a noted botanist in Quebec, Canada.

Marie-Victorin gained worldwide fame as the author of Flore laurentienne and father of the Botanical Garden of Montreal.

== Biography ==
He was born Joseph-Louis-Conrad Kirouac to Cyrille Kirouac, a wealthy merchant, and Philomène Luneau in, Kingsey Falls, Quebec. Prior to taking religious vows and becoming Brother Marie-Victorin, he was known as Conrad. Although Brother Victorin is on record as having suggested that Montreal build its own botanical gardens as early as 1919, the Garden was not authorized until 1929 when Montreal Mayor Camillien Houde approved it, with construction beginning in 1931.

Subsequent administrations, both municipal and provincial, opposed the Garden as a boondoggle; however, Brother Victorin continued to champion its cause, promoting it at every opportunity, leading specimen-collection expeditions, recruiting Henry Teuscher as its designer, and protecting it from being converted into a military flight school, even during the Second World War.

Brother Victorin is also known for his writings: his Flore laurentienne is a botanical record of all species indigenous to southern Quebec, and was the first such record to be compiled. He also wrote the preface to an historical biography of another fifth cousin, Zephirin Paquet. Sa famille, sa Vie, son Oeuvre. Essai de Monographie Familiale, par frère Alcas.

Brother Victorin died in Montreal in a car accident in July 1944, and he was entombed at the Notre Dame des Neiges Cemetery in Montreal. A building at the Université de Montréal, where he had taught botany, was subsequently named for him.

== Tribute ==
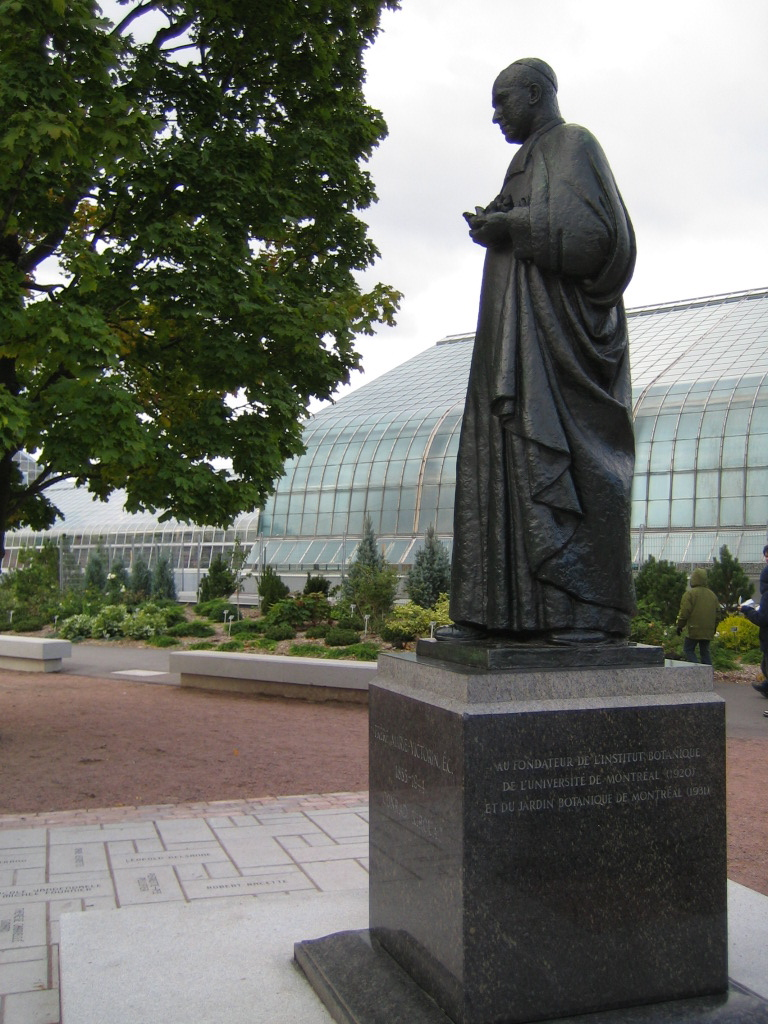
Brother Marie-Victorin Statue, Montreal Botanical Garden

Brother Marie-Victorin is one of the most honored Quebec personalities of the 20th century. At the Commission toponymy Quebec, a query on Marie-Victorin gives 69 results: mountains, lakes, roads, parks, buildings, etc., honor his memory.

The Marie-Victorin Rosa (Rose), developed by Agriculture and Agri-Food Canada, was named in his honour.

To honour the centennial of his birth in 1985, a park was established in his hometown of Kingsey Falls, named Parc Marie-Victorin. Originally 3 acres, it has expanded to nearly 30 acres, with volunteers and a small permanent staff. The park has been a leader in the province for horticultural development in the green movement.

In the early 1990s, a private high school in Montréal was opened and named for him. The school is still open but its name was changed in 2006.

Bro. Victorin has been inducted as a member of the Canadian Science and Engineering Hall of Fame. He is fictionalized as a central character in André Forcier's 2019 film Forgotten Flowers (Les fleurs oubliées), in which he is portrayed by Yves Jacques. He is also portrayed by Alexandre Goyette in Lyne Charlebois's 2023 film Tell Me Why These Things Are So Beautiful (Dis-moi pourquoi ces choses sont si belles).

== Gallery ==
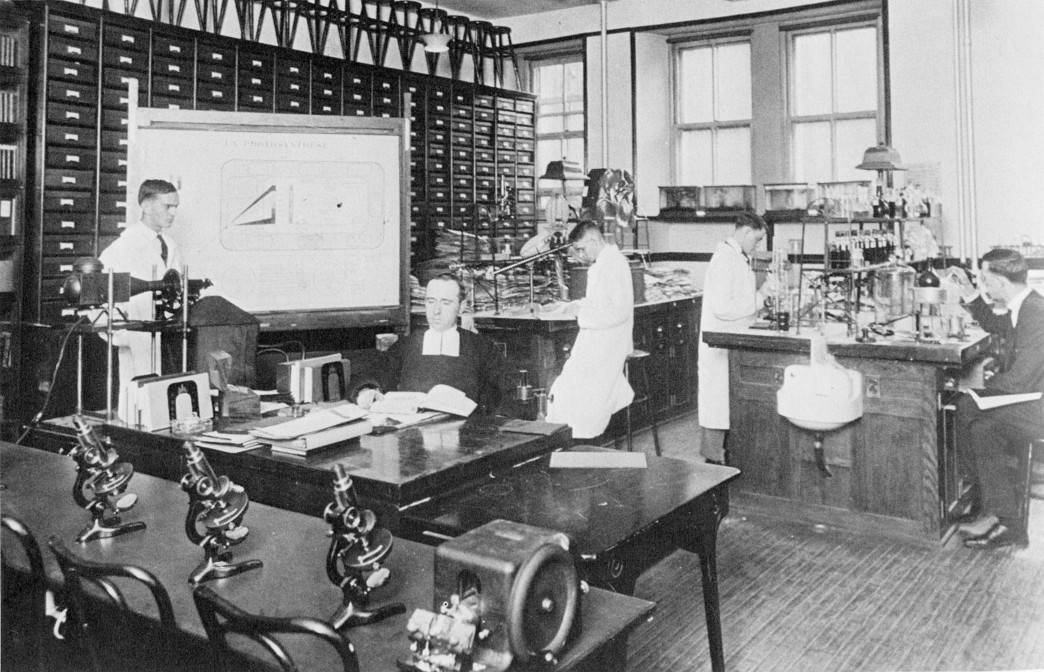
M.-V. and students, Faculty of Science of Laval University's branch in Montreal, around 1925

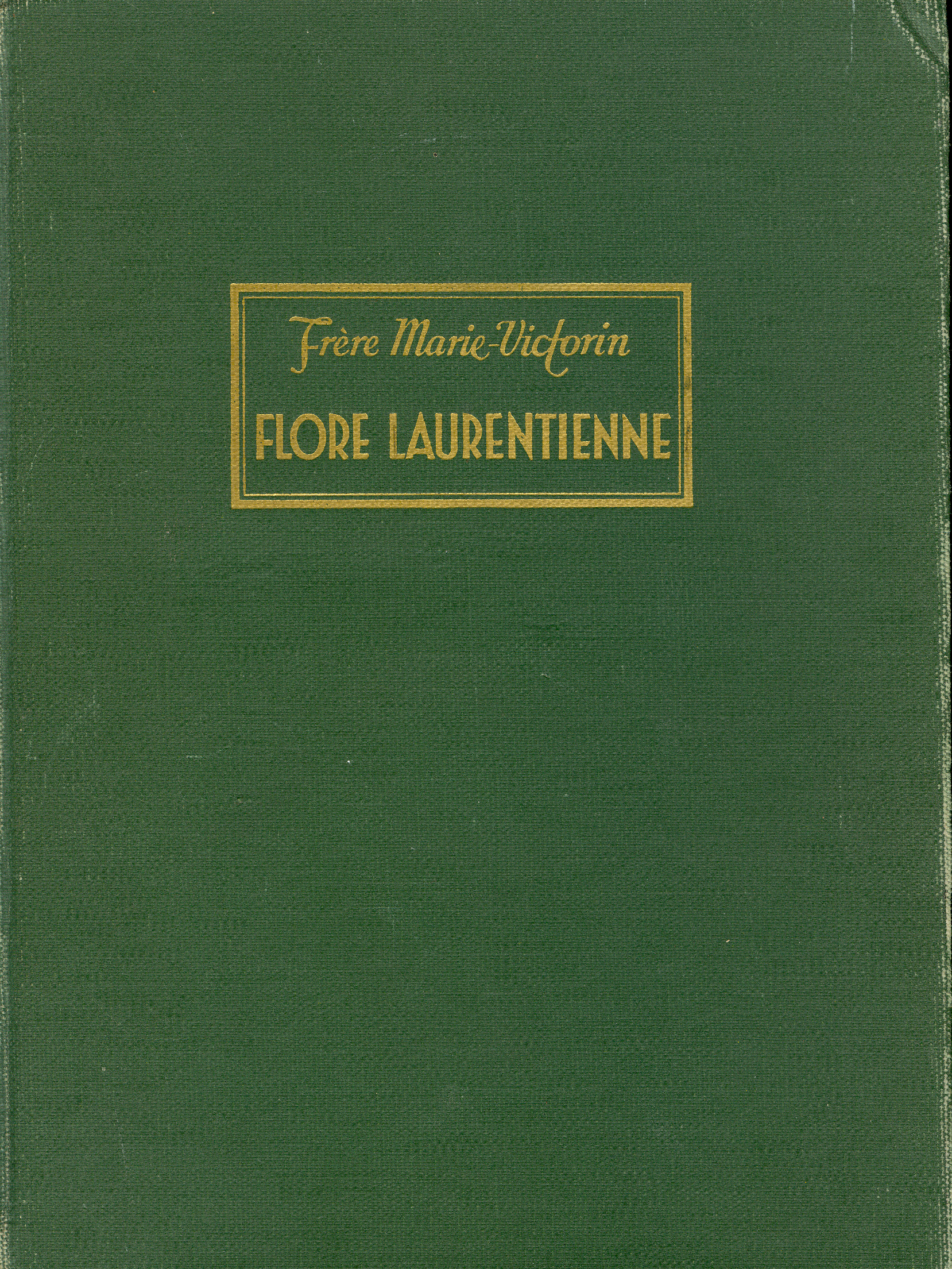
Flore laurentienne—cover of 1st edition, 1935

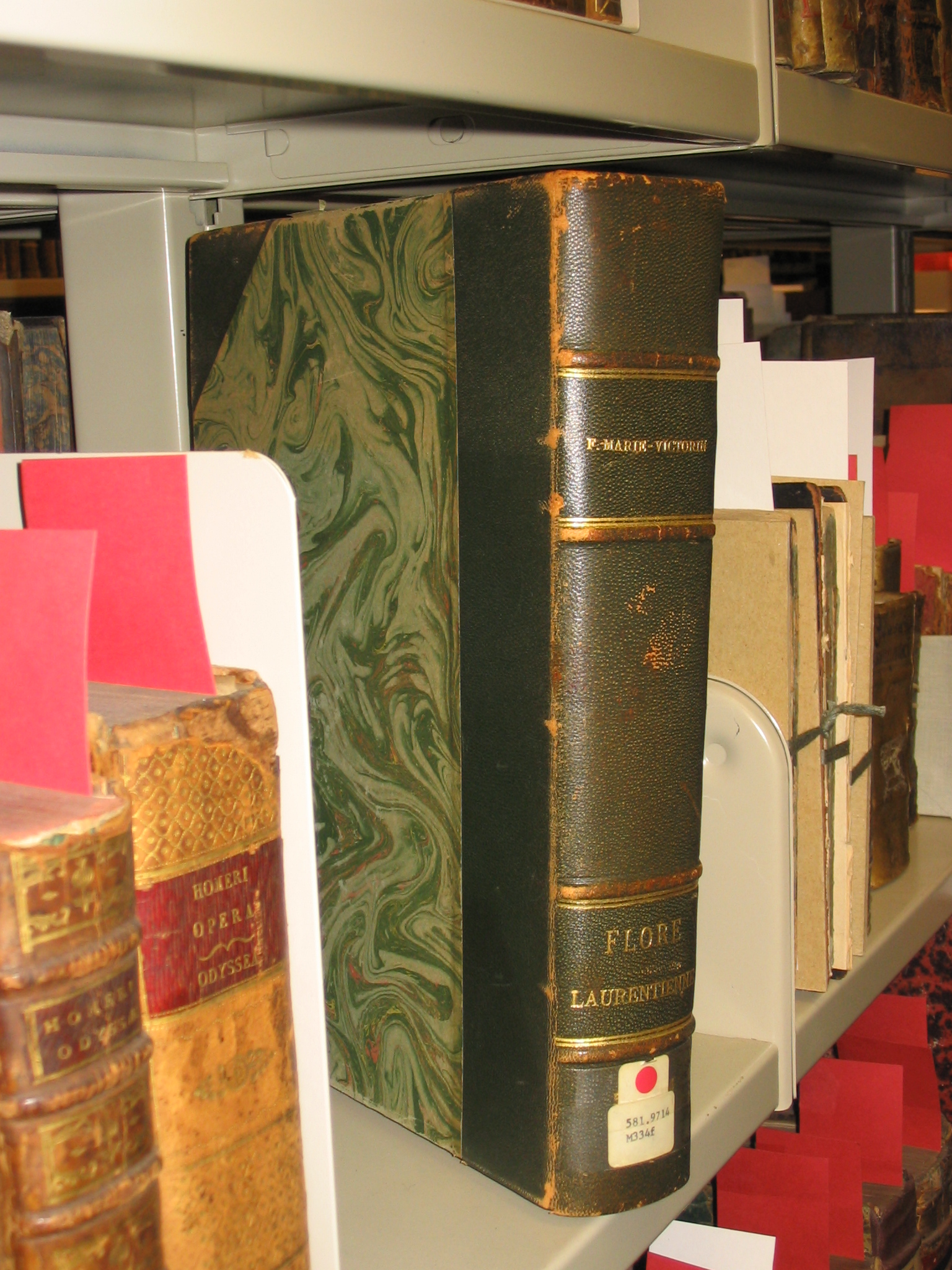
Flore laurentienne, in the Livres rares et collections spéciales, pavillon Thérèse-Casgrain, Université du Québec à Montréal (UQAM)
