= Transport MRC de Joliette =

Public transportation agency in Joliette, Quebec

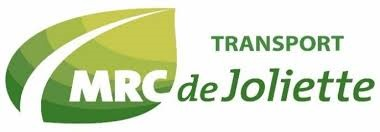
- Founded: 2002
- Headquarters: 930, rue Saint-Louis, Joliette
- Locale: Lanaudière
- Service area: MRC de D'Autray, MRC de Joliette, MRC de Matawinie and MRC de Montcalm
- Service type: bus service

Transport MRC de Joliette is responsible for organising public transportation services throughout the Joliette Regional County Municipality, but also a large part of the administrative region of Lanaudière, northeast of Montreal, in central Quebec, Canada.

== History ==
The Quebec Ministry of Transport produced a report in 1999 which analyzed the Lanaudière region's transport problems. This report overwhelmingly favoured a public transportation service managed within the region instead of the integration of existing public transit in L'Assomption and Les Moulins with either of the large Montreal (STM) or Laval (STL) systems. The result of this was the creation of the Conseil régional de transport Lanaudière in 2002, under the management of the six regional county municipalities of D'Autray, Joliette, L'Assomption, Matawinie, Montcalm and Les Moulins, with additional transit user representation on the board. This also required each MRC to manage operations in their territory, with a structure which may vary depending on different local needs.

In June 2017, Quebec Ministry of Transport approved the law 76, which modified the transport gouvernance of transport entities in the Metropolitan Region of Montréal. The Administration of the CRTL was transferred to the MRC de Joliette – Division Transport, as well as the CTJM (Corporation de Transport Joliette-Métropolitain) and the TAJM (Transport Adapté Joliette-Mértopolitain) got implemented into the MRC de Joliette's transport division the same date.

== Services ==
The municipalities of Joliette and Notre-Dame-des-Prairies as well as the municipalities of Crabtree, Notre-Dame-de-Loudres, Saint-Ambroise-de-Kildare, Saint-Charles-Boromée, Sainte-Mélanie, Saint-Paul, Saint-Pierre and Saint-Thomas are being served by Transport MRC de Joliette (Interurban Routes). Specialized accessible transportation is administered locally within each member regional county municipality.

Some southern municipalities within the region that are part of Greater Montreal are serviced by Exo's Terrebonne-Mascouche and L'Assomption sector.

== Bus Terminals ==
- Terminus Joliette

This small office, located at 942, rue St-Louis in Joliette, is owned and operated by Transport MRC de Joliette and is not part of the ARTM system, but is partnered with it.

== Bus routes ==
Transport MRC de Joliette
No.	Local Routes – Description	
A	Notre-Dame-Des-Prairies	
B	Saint-Charles-Borromée	
C	Saint-Charles-Borromée - Joliette (Christ-Roy and Bélair sectors)	
D	Joliette (Saint-Pierre and Du Moulin sectors)	
E	Joliette (Saint-Jean-Baptiste and Sainte-Thérèse sectors)	
X	Express	
No.	Interurban Routes – Description	Connects to
32	St-Michel-des-Saints – Saint-Zénon – Sainte-Émilie-de-l'Énergie – Saint-Jean-de-Matha – Saint-Félix-de-Valois – Notre-Dame-de-Lourdes – Notre-Dame-des-Prairies – Joliette	
34	Rawdon – Saint-Ambroise-de-Kildare – Saint-Charles-Borromée – Joliette	
35	St-Lin-Laurentides – Sainte-Sophie – St-Jérôme	Saint-Jérôme
50	Joliette – Saint-Paul-de-Joliette – Crabtree – Sainte-Marie-Salomé – L'Assomption – Repentigny – Lavaltrie – Montreal	Terminus Repentigny; Radisson
125	Saint-Donat – Notre-Dame-de-la-Merci – Entrelacs – Chertsey – Rawdon – Sainte-Julienne – Saint-Esprit – Saint-Roch-de-L’Achigan – Mascouche – Montreal	Terminus Terrebonne; Radisson
131–138	Joliette – Lavaltrie – Lanoraie – Berthierville	

== See also ==
- Exo (public transit) bus services
- Keolis
