= Honoré-Beaugrand station =

Montreal Metro station

Honoré-Beaugrand
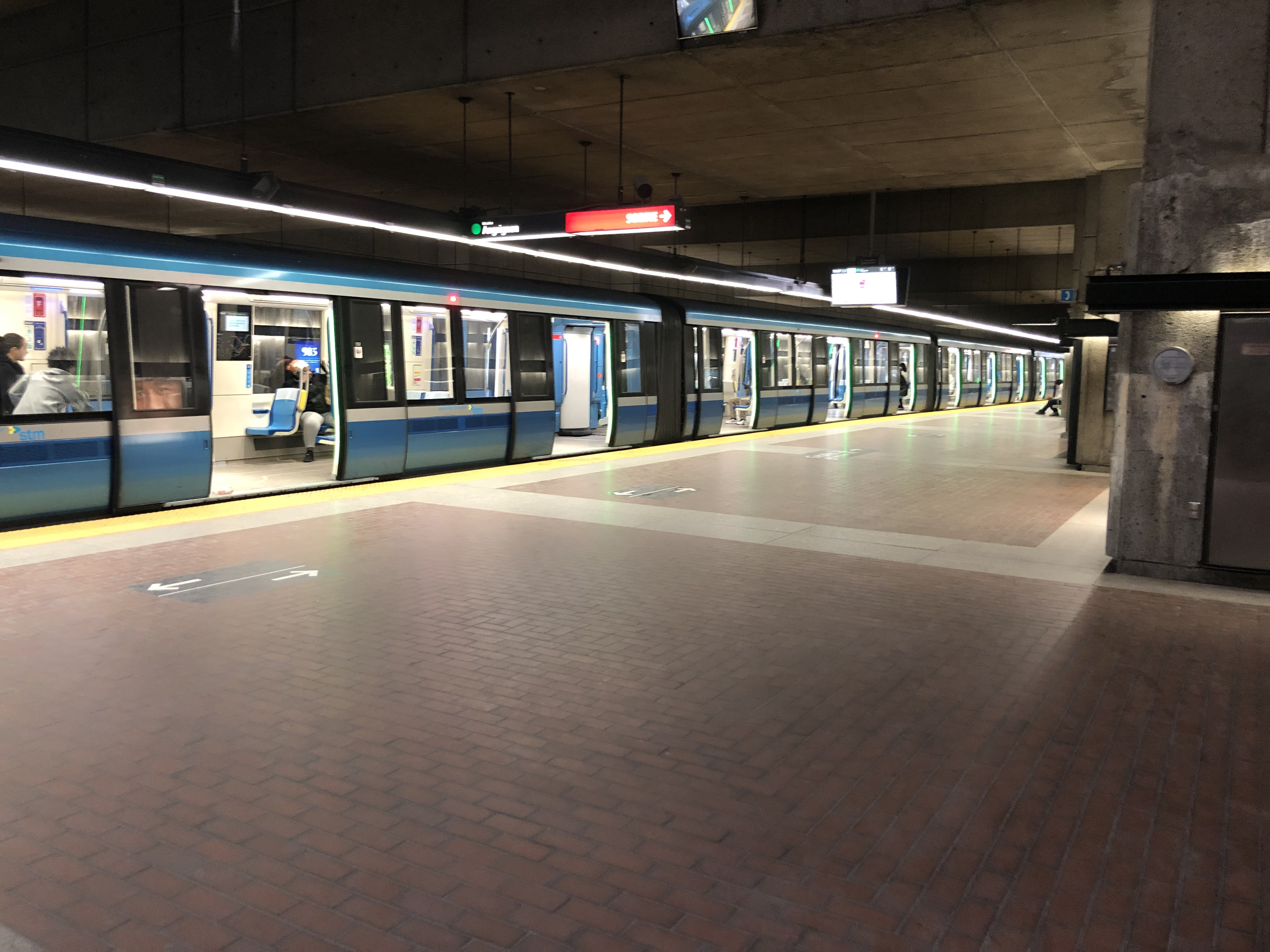

General information
- Location: Sherbrooke Street / rue Honoré-Beaugrand; Montreal, Quebec H1L 1A8; Canada
- Coordinates: 45°35′48″N 73°32′08″W
- Operator: Société de transport de Montréal
- Platforms: 2 side platforms
- Tracks: 2
- Connections: STM bus; Exo bus services

Construction
- Depth: 9.4 metres (30 feet 10 inches), 55th deepest
- Accessible: Yes
- Architect: Yves Bernard

Other information
- Fare zone: ARTM: A

History
- Opened: 6 June 1976

Passengers
- 2024: 4,981,933 ▲13.42%
- Rank: 12 of 68

Services
| Preceding station | Montreal Metro | Following station |
|---|---|---|
| Radisson toward Angrignon | Green Line | Terminus |
Location

Honoré-Beaugrand station (French pronunciation: [ɔnɔʁe boɡʁɑ̃]) is a Montreal Metro station in the borough of Mercier–Hochelaga-Maisonneuve in Montreal, Quebec, Canada. It is operated by the Société de transport de Montréal (STM) and is the eastern terminus of the Green Line. It is located in the district of Tétreaultville. The station opened on June 6, 1976, replacing Frontenac station as the terminus.

== Overview ==
Designed by Papineau, Gérin-Lajoie, Le Blanc, Edwards, it is a normal side platform station built in open cut. A vast mezzanine at the eastern end of the station provides access to three exits, two of which are surrounded by bus loops serving a large number of bus routes from the east end of the island. The stairs from the mezzanine to the platforms are surmounted by ceramic murals, one the reverse of the other, by Jean-Paul Mousseau.

Entrances/exits are at 7950 and 7955, rue Sherbrooke and 4755, rue Honoré-Beaugrand.

The station is equipped with the MétroVision information screens which display news, commercials, and the time till the next train.

In 2016, work began on a $20m renovation project at the station, including waterproofing, replacement of paving & lighting and the installation of three elevators. In December 2018, the station became the 14th accessible Metro station on the network.

== Origin of the name ==
Honoré-Beaugrand was named after the adjoining rue Honoré-Beaugrand, which was in turn named after Honoré Beaugrand, who served as mayor of Montreal from 1885 to 1887. He founded the Montreal newspaper La Patrie in 1879. Soon after, he left the city to travel and write.

== Terminus Honoré-Beaugrand ==
There is a bus terminus on both sides of Sherbrooke Street, however Exo buses use street stops.

=== Connecting bus routes ===
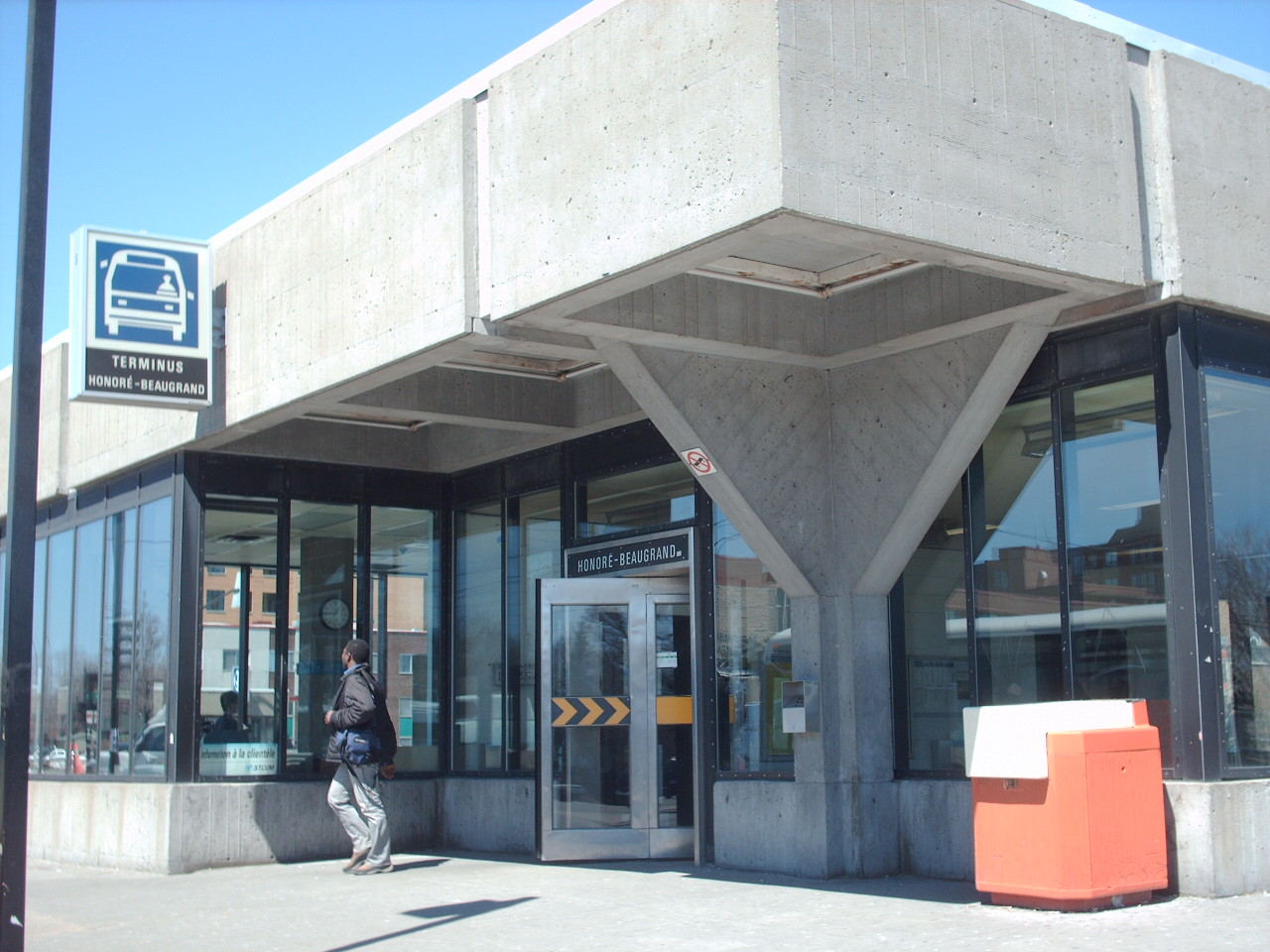
Entrance to bus platforms

Société de transport de Montréal
| No. | Route | Connects to | Service times / notes |
|---|---|---|---|
| 18 | Beaubien | Beaubien; Pie-IX BRT | Daily |
| 26 | Mercier-Est | Radisson | Daily Limited westbound AM rush service ends at this station directly via Sherbrooke |
| 28 | Honoré-Beaugrand | | Daily |
| 85 | Hochelaga | Pie-IX BRT; Joliette; Préfontaine; Frontenac | Daily |
| 141 | Jean-Talon East | Pie-IX BRT; Saint-Michel | Daily |
| 185 | Sherbrooke | Radisson; Langelier; Cadillac; Frontenac | Daily |
| 186 | Sherbrooke East | Pointe-aux-Trembles; Sherbrooke East Park and Ride | Daily |
| 187 | René-Lévesque | | Daily |
| 189 | Notre-Dame | | Daily |
| 362 ☾ | Hochelaga / Notre-Dame | Joliette; Préfontaine; Frontenac | Night service |
| 364 ☾ | Sherbrooke / Joseph-Renaud | Radisson; Langelier; Cadillac; Frontenac; Bonaventure; Gare Centrale; Terminus Centre-ville; Lucien-L'Allier; Atwater | Night service |
| 370 ☾ | Rosemont | Radisson; Langelier; Rosemont; Outremont; Plamondon | Night service |
| 486 | Express Sherbrooke | Pointe-aux-Trembles; Sherbrooke East Park and Ride | Weekdays, peak only |
| 487 | Express Bout-de-l’Île | | Weekdays, peak only |
Exo L'Assomption sector
| No. | Route | Connects to | Service times / notes |
| 100 | L'Assomption - Repentigny - Charlemagne - Montreal | Repentigny; Radisson | Weekdays only |
| 200 | Express Repentigny - Montreal | Terminus Repentigny; Radisson | Weekdays, peak only Westbound only |
| 300 | Repentigny - Montreal via Notre-Dame | Terminus Repentigny; Radisson | Weekdays only |
| 400 | Repentigny - Montreal via Sherbrooke | Terminus Repentigny; Radisson | Daily |

== Nearby points of interest ==
- Centre hospitalier juif de l'Espérance
- Louis Hippolyte Lafontaine Tunnel
- Village Champlain
