= Terrebonne station =

Railway station in Quebec, Canada

Terrebonne
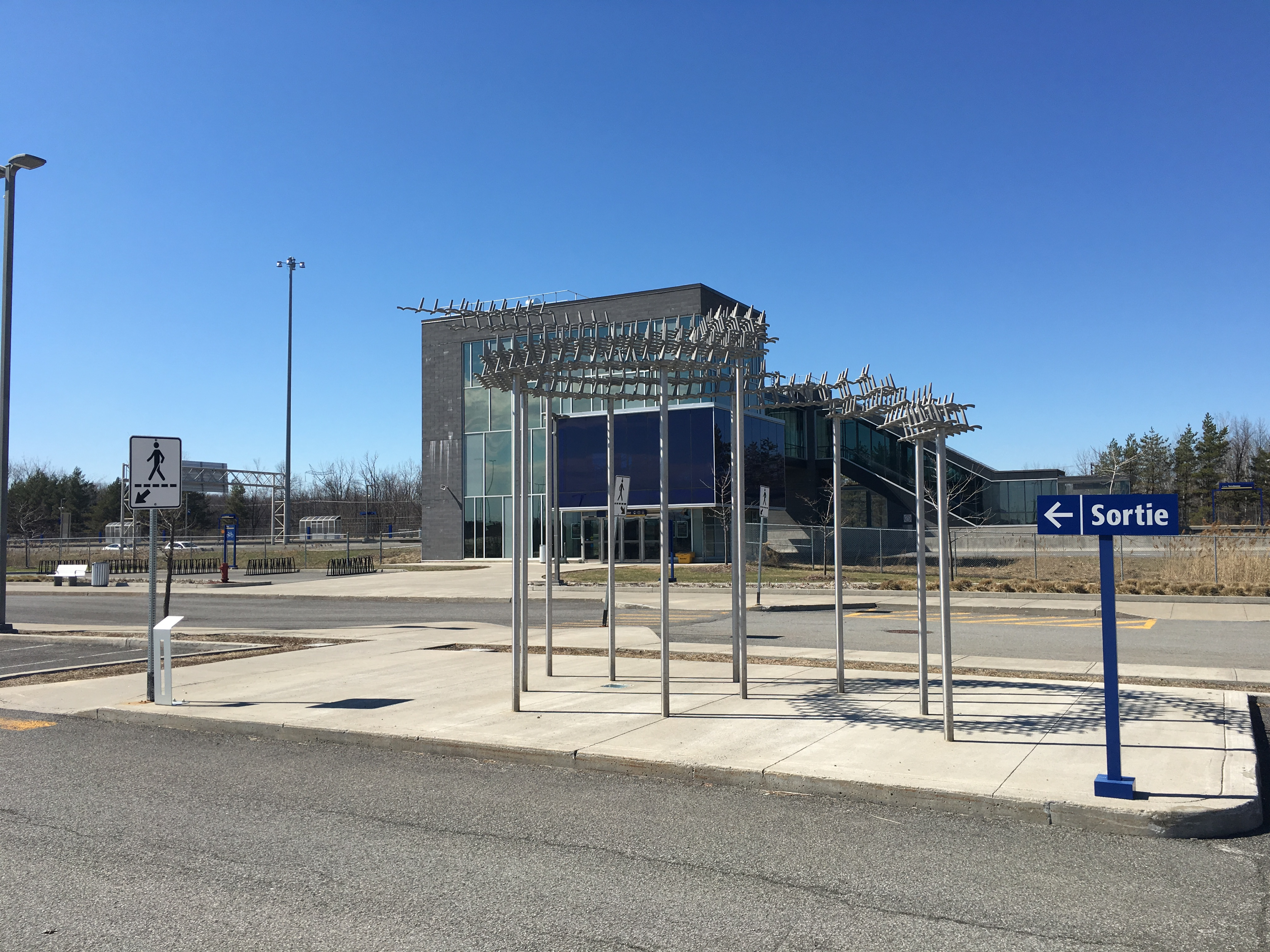

General information
- Location: 4000 Marcel-Therrien Boulevard; Terrebonne, Quebec J6V 1S7
- Coordinates: 45°43′42″N 73°31′17″W
- Operator: Exo
- Platforms: 1 side platform
- Tracks: 1
- Connections: Exo bus services

Construction
- Parking: 726 Park-and-Ride, 9 Carpooling, and 9 Disabled spaces
- Cycle facilities: 75 spaces
- Accessible: Yes

Other information
- Fare zone: ARTM: C
- Website: Terrebonne (RTM)

History
- Opened: December 1, 2014

Passengers
- 2019: 181,700 (Exo)

Services
Preceding station	Exo	Following station
Mascouche Terminus	Line 15 – Mascouche	Repentigny toward Côte-de-Liesse
Location

Terrebonne station (French pronunciation: [tɛʁbɔn]) is a commuter rail station operated by Exo in Terrebonne, Quebec, Canada. It is served by the Mascouche line.

Despite its name, it is located some 9 km from the town centre of Terrebonne, instead serving the district of Lachenaie, a former municipality that was merged with Terrebonne in 2001.

The station is located on the median of Quebec Autoroute 640. It possesses a single track and a single side platform. The platform is a high-level platform, a feature shared only with Gare Centrale, Repentigny, and Mascouche stations on the commuter train network. The station has a single exit, reached via an enclosed overhead bridge passing over the eastbound autoroute lane to reach the main parking lot, with stair and elevator access. As a result, the station is wheelchair-accessible. The parking lot and adjacent bus loop are reached from Boulevard Marcel-Therrien.

An artwork by Patrick Coutu, an aluminum and stainless steel sculpture entitled Myriade, stands in the parking lot near the station entrance.

== Connecting bus routes ==
Exo Terrebonne-Mascouche sector
No.	Route	Connects to	Service times / notes
140	Lachenaie - Gare de Terrebonne - Terminus Radisson	Radisson	Weekdays only
