= Mascouche station =

Railway station in Quebec, Canada

Mascouche
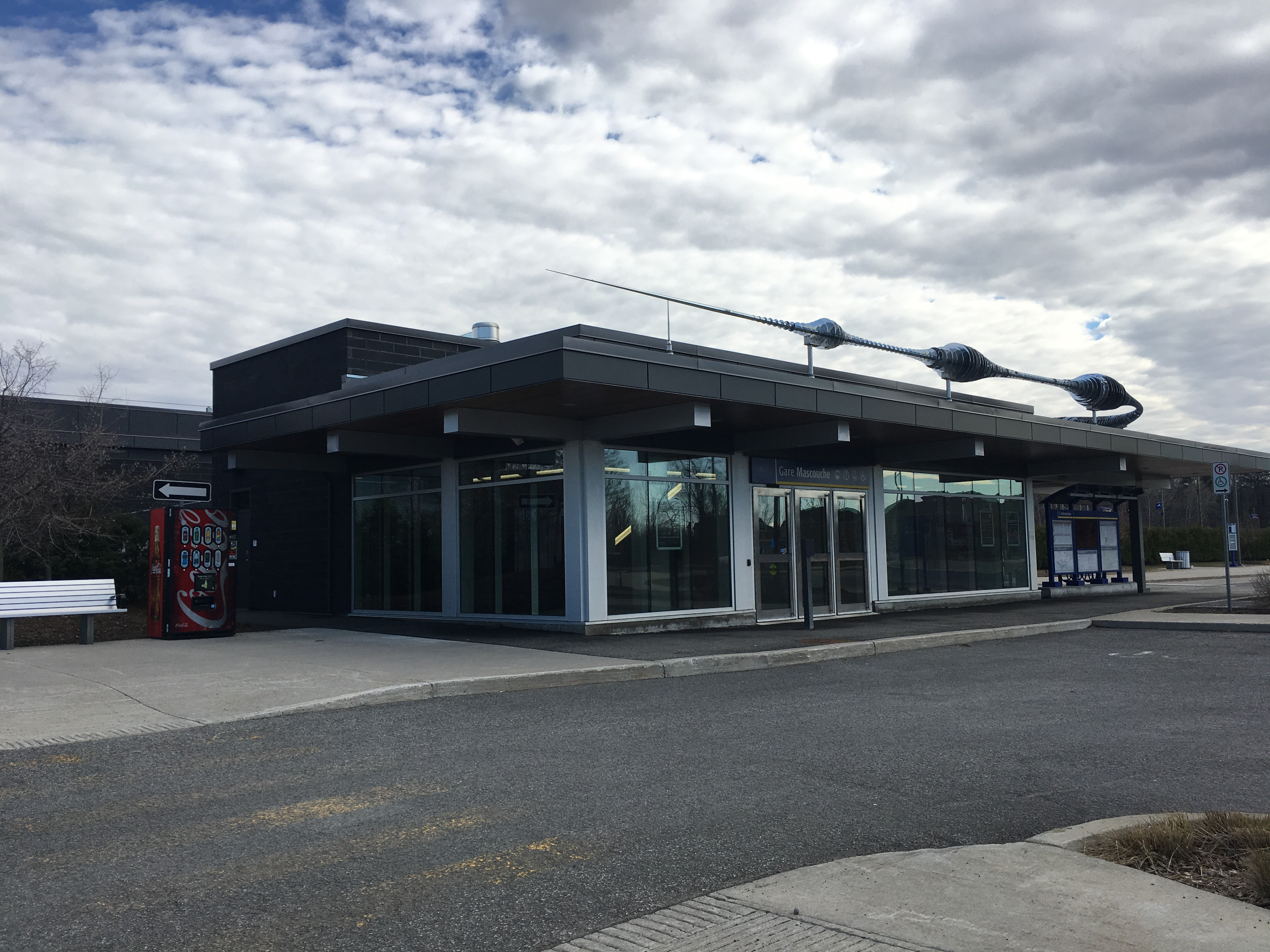

General information
- Location: 1450 Station Avenue; Mascouche, Quebec J7K 3L7
- Coordinates: 45°43′47″N 73°35′55″W
- Operator: Exo
- Platforms: 1 side platform
- Tracks: 1 in passenger use (5 yard tracks, 1 freight track)
- Connections: Exo bus services

Construction
- Parking: 680 Park-and-Ride, 2 Carpooling, and 8 Disabled spaces
- Cycle facilities: 24 spaces
- Accessible: Yes

Other information
- Fare zone: ARTM: C
- Website: Mascouche (RTM)

History
- Opened: December 1, 2014; 11 years ago

Passengers
- 2019: 267,700 (Exo)

Services
Preceding station	Exo	Following station
Terminus	Line 15 – Mascouche	Terrebonne toward Côte-de-Liesse
Track layout
Location

Mascouche station (French pronunciation: [maskuʃ]) is a commuter rail station operated by Exo in Mascouche, Quebec, Canada, a suburb north of Montreal. It is the northern terminus of the Mascouche line.

The station is located parallel to Rue de la Gare in Mascouche. It is located in a yard with five parallel tracks, but possesses a single side platform face. The platform is a high-level platform, a feature shared only with Gare Centrale, Repentigny, and Terrebonne stations on the commuter train network. The station has a single exit, reached via a tunnel passing under the westernmost track, with stair and elevator access. As a result, the station is wheelchair-accessible. The parking lots and bus loop are reached from Avenue de la Gare.

An artwork by Marc Dulude, a sculpture entitled Continuum, runs along the roof edge of the station entrance building.

== Connecting bus routes ==
Exo Terrebonne-Mascouche sector
No.	Route	Connects to	Services times / notes
2	Terrebonne - Mascouche	Terminus Terrebonne	Daily
30	Gare Mascouche - Terrebonne - Terminus Radisson	Terminus Terrebonne; Radisson	Daily
417	La Plaine - Gare Mascouche		Weekdays, peak only
