= Exo Terrebonne-Mascouche and L'Assomption sector =

- Parent: Exo
- Founded: 2017
- Service area: Terrebonne, Mascouche, L'Assomption, Repentigny, L'Épiphanie, Lavaltrie, Charlemagne, Saint-Sulpice
- Service type: bus service, paratransit, on-demand taxibus
- Routes: 28 (Terrebonne-Mascouche); 13 (L'Assomption)
- Destinations: Montreal and other North Shore municipalities
- Hubs: Terminus Repentigny, Terminus Terrebonne
- Annual ridership: 2,660,749 (Terrebonne-Mascouche, 2024); 1,653,882 (L'Assomption, 2024)

The Exo Terrebonne-Mascouche and Exo L'Assomption sectors are the division responsible for providing public transit service to mainly the communities of Terrebonne, Mascouche, Repentigny and L'Assomption.

== History ==
The Quebec Ministry of Transport produced a report in 1999 which analyzed the Lanaudière region's transport problems. This report overwhelmingly favoured a public transportation service managed within the region instead of the integration of existing public transit in L'Assomption and Les Moulins with either of the large Montreal (STM) or Laval (STL) systems. The result of this was the creation of the Conseil régional de transport Lanaudière in 2002, under the management of the six regional county municipalities of D'Autray, Joliette, L'Assomption, Matawinie, Montcalm and Les Moulins, with additional transit user representation on the board. This also required each MRC to manage operations in their territory, with a structure which may vary depending on different local needs.

In June 2017, Quebec Ministry of Transport approved the law 76, which modified the transport gouvernance of transport entities in the Metropolitan Region of Montréal. Exo then took over the operation of bus services for both Terrebonne-Mascouche and L'Assomption sectors.

== Services - Terrebonne-Mascouche sector ==
=== Local bus routes ===
Local routes
No.	Route	Connects to	Service times / notes
1	Terrebonne - Mascouche	Terminus Terrebonne	Same line as line 41
2	Terrebonne - Mascouche	Mascouche; Terminus Terrebonne	Daily
3	Terrebonne - Mascouche	Terminus Terrebonne	Daily
4	Terrebonne - Mascouche	Terminus Terrebonne	Weekdays only
5	Terrebonne - Bois-des-Filion	Terminus Terrebonne	Same line as line 45
8	Terrebonne - Centre Sector	Terminus Terrebonne	Daily
9	Terrebonne - West Sector	Terminus Terrebonne	Weekdays only
11	Terrebonne - Lachenaie	Terminus Terrebonne	Daily
11C	Terrebonne - Cité du Sport - Lachenaie		Weekdays, peak only
14	Terrebonne - La Plaine	Terminus Terrebonne	Daily
17	Terrebonne - Mascouche	Terminus Terrebonne	Daily
18	Terrebonne - Cité du Sport - Cégep de Terrebonne	Terminus Terrebonne	Daily
20	Terrebonne - Mascouche	Terminus Terrebonne	Daily
21	Terrebonne - Mascouche	Terminus Terrebonne	Weekdays, peak only
22	Mascouche - Cité du Sport - Cégep de Terrebonne		Weekdays only
24C	Terrebonne - Cité du Sport - Cégep de Terrebonne		Weekdays, peak only
27	Terrebonne - Cité du Sport - Cégep de Terrebonne	Terminus Terrebonne	Weekdays, peak only
41	Terrebonne - Mascouche	Terminus Terrebonne	Same line as line 1
45	Terrebonne - Bois-des-Filion	Terminus Terrebonne	Same line as line 5
48	Terrebonne - Centre Sector	Terminus Terrebonne	Daily

=== On-demand bus routes ===
On-demand bus routes
No.	Route	Connects to	Service times / notes
Exo bus services	exo à la demande Terrebonne	Terminus Terrebonne	Weekdays only; Reserve in real time; Reservations via exo transport à la demande mobile app

=== Express / regional bus routes ===
Express / regional routes
No.	Route	Connects to	Service times / notes
19	Terrebonne - Terminus Montmorency	Montmorency; Terminus Terrebonne	Daily
23	Terrebonne - Sainte-Thérèse (Cégep Lionel-Groulx)	Sainte-Thérèse; Terminus Terrebonne	Weekdays, peak only
25	Terrebonne - Montréal	Henri-Bourassa; Pie-IX BRT; Terminus Terrebonne	Weekdays only
25B	Terrebonne - Montréal	Terminus Terrebonne; Pie-IX BRT	Weekdays evenings and weekends only
30	Gare Mascouche - Terrebonne - Terminus Radisson	Radisson; Mascouche; Terminus Terrebonne	Daily
40	Lachenaie - Montreal - Terminus Radisson	Radisson	Weekends only
140	Lachenaie - Gare de Terrebonne - Terminus Radisson	Radisson; Terrebonne	Weekdays only
417	La Plaine - Gare Mascouche	Mascouche	Weekdays, peak only
512	Terrebonne (West) - Laval	Cartier	Daily

== Services - L'Assomption sector ==
=== Local bus routes ===
Local routes
No.	Route	Connects to	Service times / notes
1	Repentigny North - Cégep	Terminus Repentigny	Daily
2	Repentigny - Saint-Sulpice - Lavaltrie		Weekdays, peak only (except one noon trip)
5	Repentigny Station Shuttle	Repentigny; Terminus Repentigny	Weekdays, peak only
6	L'Épiphanie - L'Assomption		Weekdays, peak only
8	Repentigny Centre Sector - Cégep	Terminus Repentigny	Daily
9	Charlemagne - CHLPG - Terrebonne	Repentigny; Terminus Repentigny	Daily
11	Repentigny Le Gardeur Sector - Cégep	Terminus Repentigny	Daily
14	L'Assomption - Repentigny - Le Gardeur	Repentigny; Terminus Repentigny	Daily
15	Repentigny South Sector - (Notre-Dame Street)	Terminus Repentigny	Daily

=== Express / regional bus routes ===
Express/ regional routes
No.	Route	Connects to	Service times / notes
100	L'Assomption - Repentigny - Charlemagne - Montreal	Honoré-Beaugrand; Radisson; Repentigny	Weekdays only
200	Express Repentigny - Montreal	Honoré-Beaugrand; Radisson; Terminus Repentigny	Weekdays, peak only
300	Repentigny - Montreal via Notre-Dame	Honoré-Beaugrand; Radisson; Terminus Repentigny	Weekdays only
400	Repentigny - Montreal via Sherbrooke	Honoré-Beaugrand; Radisson; Terminus Repentigny	Daily

== See also ==
- Exo (public transit) bus services
