= Radisson station =

Montreal Metro station

Radisson
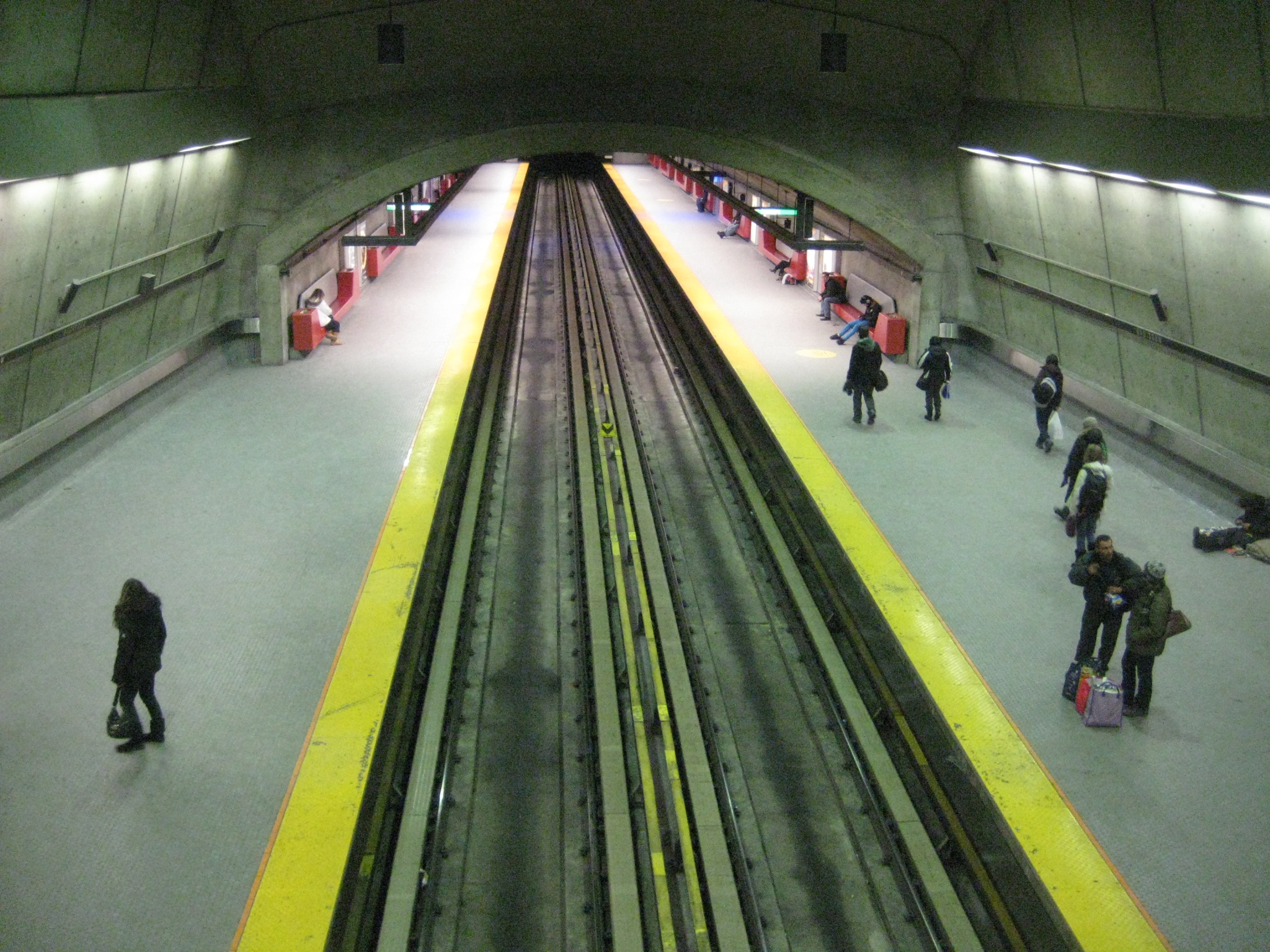

General information
- Location: 7155 and 7250, Sherbrooke Street East; Montreal, Quebec H1N 1E3; Canada
- Coordinates: 45°35′20″N 73°32′22″W
- Operator: Société de transport de Montréal
- Platforms: 2 side platforms
- Tracks: 2
- Connections: Terminus Radisson

Construction
- Depth: 17.4 metres (57 feet 1 inch), 25th deepest
- Accessible: No
- Architect: Papineau, Gérin-Lajoie, Le Blanc, Edwards

Other information
- Fare zone: ARTM: A

History
- Opened: 6 June 1976

Passengers
- 2024: 3,466,806 ▲11.42%
- Rank: 29 of 68

Services
Preceding station	Montreal Metro	Following station
Langelier toward Angrignon	Green Line	Honoré-Beaugrand Terminus
Location

Radisson station is a Montreal Metro station in the borough of Mercier–Hochelaga-Maisonneuve in Montreal, Quebec, Canada. It is operated by the Société de transport de Montréal (STM) and serves the Green Line. It is in the district of Saint-Jean-de-Dieu. It opened on June 6, 1976, as part of the extension of the Green Line to Honoré-Beaugrand station.

== Overview ==
Designed by Papineau, Gérin-Lajoie, Le Blanc, Edwards, it is a normal side platform station built partly in tunnel, with a very tall, vaulted volume over the eastern part of the platform. This contains the transept and a tall escalator shaft rising unsupported to the ticket hall above. The latter gives access to three entrances. The station serves a metropolitan bus terminus and a park and ride lot.

In 2022, the STM's Universal Accessibility Report noted that preliminary design work to make the station accessible was underway.

== Origin of the name ==
The station is named for rue Radisson. Pierre-Esprit Radisson (c. 1640–1710) was a French explorer who was instrumental in the development of the Hudson's Bay Company.

== Nearby points of interest ==
- Place Versailles
- Institut universitaire en santé mentale de Montréal
- Lucie Bruneau Rehabilitation Centre
- Provigo
- Royal Versailles Hotel
- Galeries d'Anjou (with bus 44 north)
- Louis-Hippolyte Lafontaine Bridge–Tunnel

== Film and television appearances ==
- Scenes of the Bruce Willis-Richard Gere film The Jackal were shot in this station, redressed to stand in for the Capitol Heights station on the Washington Metro.

== Terminus Radisson ==
Terminus Radisson
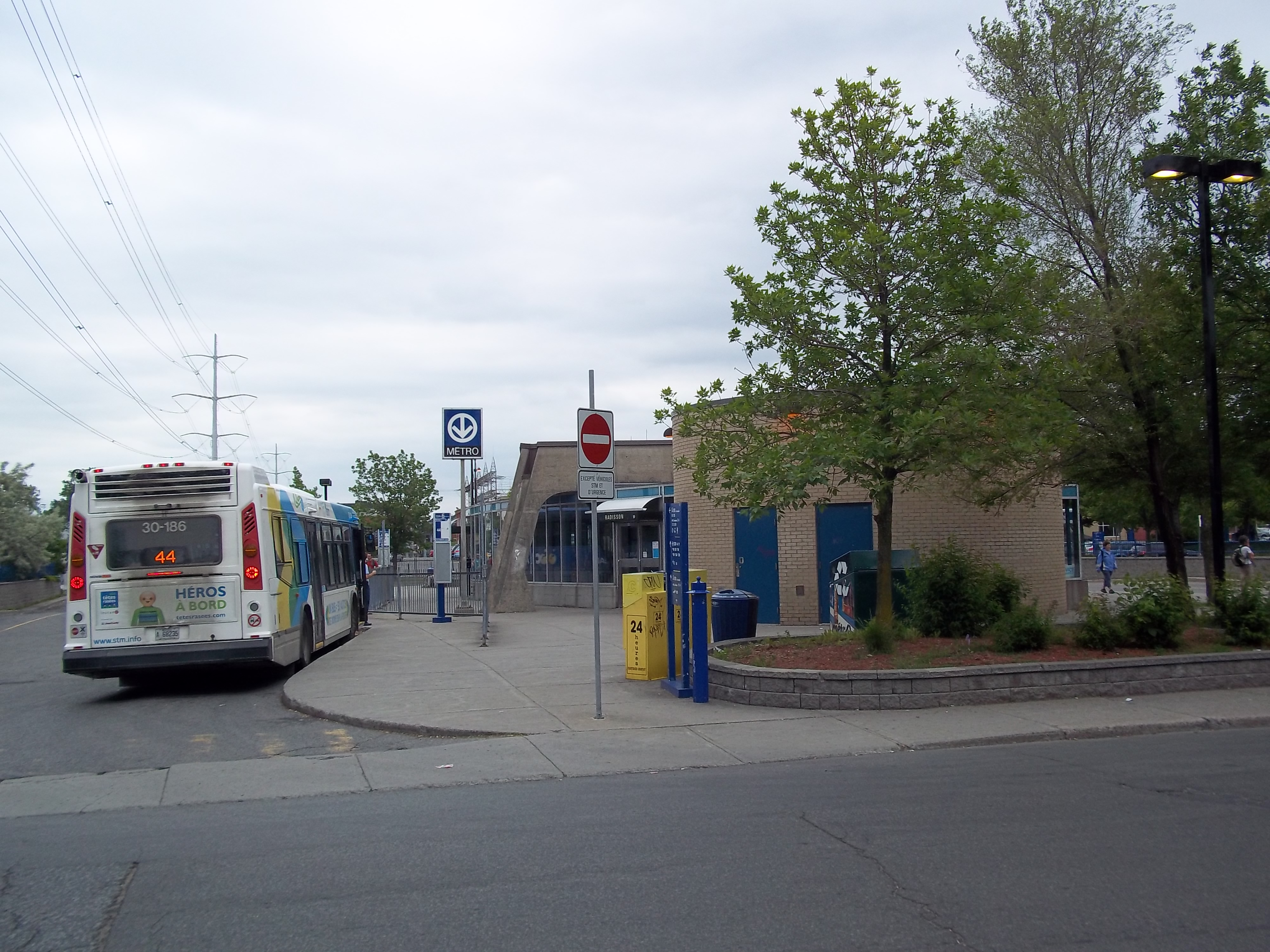

General information
- Location: 7155, Sherbrooke St East
- Coordinates: 45°25′23″N 73°32′23″W
- Owner: ARTM
- Bus stands: 7
- Bus operators: STM bus; Exo bus services; Réseau de transport de Longueuil; Société de transport de Laval; Transport MRC de Joliette

Construction
- Parking: 526 spaces
- Cycle facilities: 14 rack places

Other information
- Fare zone: ARTM: A
- Website: Terminus Radisson

Passengers
- 2016: 4,685,900 (Exo)
Location

The adjoining bus terminus, located on the west side of Sherbrooke Street, is owned by the ARTM, with all bus traffic entering and leaving through the rear at Faradon Street. Several regional MRC de Joliette and Exo lines use the terminus, as well as Société de transport de Laval and Réseau de transport de Longueuil buses, and local services provided by Société de transport de Montréal. It is the only terminus where STL and RTL bus routes meet.

On December 13, 2021, as part of mitigation measures related to major repairs of the nearby Louis-Hippolyte Lafontaine Bridge–Tunnel undertaken by the Quebec government, three new Exo bus lines as well as one new RTL line connecting the bus terminus to the South Shore were added. The announcement was made by Transport Minister and Minister Responsible for the Montreal Region, Chantal Rouleau, and Justice Minister, Attorney General, and Minister Responsible for the Montérégie region, Simon Jolin-Barrette. New bus quays would be added to the terminus as well. The new buses connect Montreal to Boucherville, Varennes, Sainte-Julie and Beloeil. The Exo buses to the South Shore operate on weekdays and holidays only, with reduced service being offered on holidays.

=== Connecting bus routes ===
Société de transport de Montréal
No.	Route	Connects to	Service times / notes
26	Mercier-Est	Honoré-Beaugrand	Daily Limited westbound AM rush service ends at Honoré-Beaugrand Metro Station directly via Sherbrooke
44	Armand-Bombardier		Daily
185	Sherbrooke	Honoré-Beaugrand; Langelier; Cadillac; Frontenac	Daily
364 ☾	Sherbrooke / Joseph-Renaud	Honoré-Beaugrand; Langelier; Cadillac; Frontenac; Atwater; Bonaventure; Lucien-L'Allier; Gare Centrale; Terminus Centre-ville	Night service
370 ☾	Rosemont	Honoré-Beaugrand; Langelier; Rosemont; Plamondon; Outremont	Night service
428	Express Parcs Industriels de l'Est	Rivière-des-Prairies	Weekdays, peak only
432	Express Lacordaire	Cadillac; Saint-Léonard-Montréal-Nord	Weekdays only Certain trips start or end at this station
444	Express Cégep Marie-Victorin		Weekdays only No summer service
448	Express Maurice-Duplessis		Weekdays, peak only
449	Express Rivière-des-Prairies	Rivière-des-Prairies	Weekdays only
811	Health Services Shuttle	Langelier; Cadillac; Assomption	Weekdays only Created to compensate for construction on Louis-Hippolyte Lafontaine Bridge–Tunnel
822	Longue-Pointe Shuttle	Langelier	Weekdays only Created to compensate for construction on Louis-Hippolyte Lafontaine Bridge–Tunnel
TA ♿︎	STM Transport adapté		
Société de transport de Laval
No.	Route	Connects to	Service times / notes
925	Métro Radisson - Saint-François		Weekdays, peak only
TA ♿︎	STL Transport adapté		
Réseau de transport de Longueuil
No.	Route	Connects to	Service times / notes
61	Boucherville / Terminus Radisson	Terminus De Montarville; De Mortagne park and ride	Daily
461	Express de Touraine / de Montarville / Radisson	De Mortagne park and ride; De Touraine park and ride	Daily
462	Touraine-Mortagne-Radisson-HMR-Inst.cardio	De Mortagne park and ride; De Touraine park and ride	Weekdays, peak only
TA ♿︎	RTL Transport adapté		
Exo Sorel-Varennes sector
No.	Route	Connects to	Service times / notes
532	Express Varennes / Radisson		Weekdays only
Exo L'Assomption sector
No.	Route	Connects to	Service times / notes
100	L'Assomption - Repentigny - Charlemagne - Montreal	Honoré-Beaugrand; Repentigny	Weekdays only
200	Express Repentigny - Montreal	Honoré-Beaugrand; Terminus Repentigny	Weekdays, peak only
300	Repentigny - Montreal via Notre-Dame	Honoré-Beaugrand; Terminus Repentigny	Weekdays only
400	Repentigny - Montreal via Sherbrooke	Honoré-Beaugrand; Terminus Repentigny	Daily
Exo Terrebonne-Mascouche sector
No.	Route	Connects to	Service times / notes
30	Gare Mascouche - Terrebonne - Terminus Radisson	Mascouche; Terminus Terrebonne	Daily
40	Lachenaie - Montreal - Terminus Radisson		Weekends only
140	Lachenaie - Gare de Terrebonne - Terminus Radisson	Terrebonne	Weekdays only
Exo Vallée-du-Richelieu sector
No.	Route	Connects to	Service times / notes
520	Express Beloeil / Radisson	Terminus Sainte-Julie; Beloeil Park and Ride	Weekdays only
Exo Transport adapté
No.	Route	Connects to	Service times / notes
TA ♿︎	Exo Transport adapté		
Transport MRC de Joliette
No.	Route	Connects to	Service times / notes
50	Joliette - Repentigny - Montréal	Terminus Repentigny	Daily
125	Saint-Donat - Chertsey - Montréal	Terminus Terrebonne	Service past Chertsey only on Fridays and weekends
TA ♿︎	MRCJ Transport adapté		

== See also ==
- List of park and rides in Greater Montreal
