= Terminus Repentigny =

Coordinates: 45°44′47″N 73°27′12″W

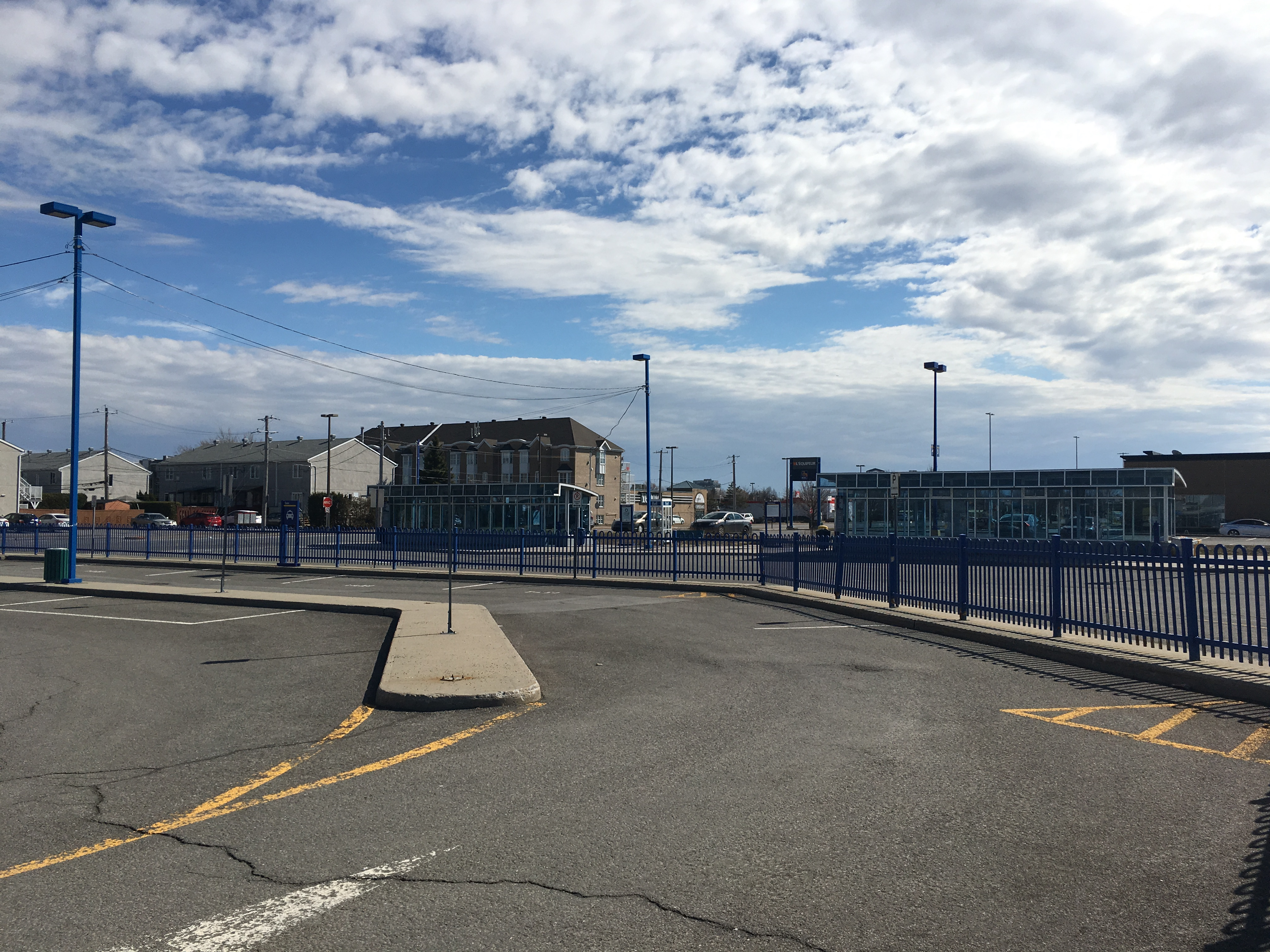

General information
- Location: 475, rue Leclerc, Repentigny, Quebec; Canada
- Operator: Réseau de transport métropolitain
- Bus stands: 3
- Bus operators: Exo bus services; Transport MRC de Joliette

Construction
- Parking: 242, Park and ride

Other information
- Fare zone: ARTM: C

Passengers
- 2016: 392,500
Location

Terminus Repentigny is a bus terminus served by Exo.

== Bus routes ==
Exo L'Assomption sector
No.	Route	Connects to	Service times / notes
1	Repentigny North - Cégep		Daily
5	Repentigny Station Shuttle	Repentigny	Weekdays, peak only
8	Repentigny Centre Sector - Cégep		Daily
9	Charlemagne - CHLPG - Terrebonne	Repentigny	Daily
11	Repentigny Le Gardeur Sector - Cégep		Daily
14	L'Assomption - Repentigny - Le Gardeur	Repentigny	Daily
15	Repentigny South Sector - (Notre-Dame Street)		Daily
200	Express Repentigny - Montreal	Honoré-Beaugrand; Radisson	Weekdays, peak only
300	Repentigny - Montreal via Notre-Dame	Honoré-Beaugrand; Radisson	Weekdays only
400	Repentigny - Montreal via Sherbrooke	Honoré-Beaugrand; Radisson	Daily
Transport MRC de Joliette
No.	Route	Connects to	Services times / notes
50	Joliette - Repentigny - Montreal	Radisson	

== See also ==
- List of park and rides in Greater Montreal
