= Repentigny station =

Railway station in Quebec, Canada

Repentigny
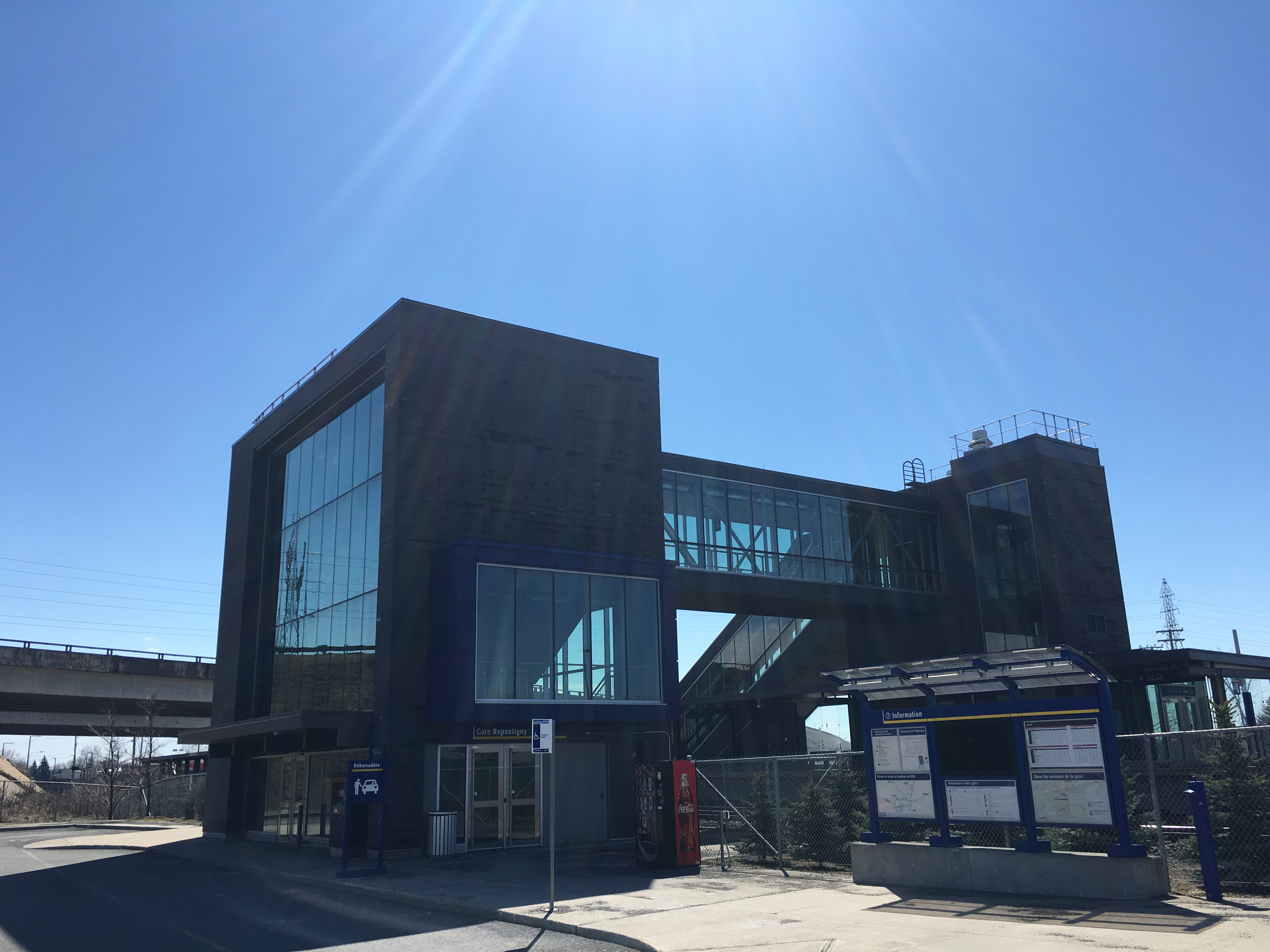

General information
- Location: 55 Lacombe Boulevard; Repentigny, Quebec J5Z 1R3
- Coordinates: 45°44′08″N 73°29′09″W
- Operator: Exo
- Platforms: 1 side platform
- Tracks: 2
- Connections: Exo bus services

Construction
- Parking: 587 Park-and-Ride, 2 Carpooling, and 10 Disabled spaces
- Cycle facilities: 49 spaces
- Accessible: Yes

Other information
- Fare zone: ARTM: C
- Website: Repentigny (RTM)

History
- Opened: December 1, 2014; 11 years ago

Passengers
- 2019: 434,300 (Exo)

Services
Preceding station	Exo	Following station
Terrebonne toward Mascouche	Line 15 – Mascouche	Pointe-aux-Trembles toward Côte-de-Liesse
Location

Repentigny station (French pronunciation: [ʁəpɑ̃tiɲi]) is a commuter rail station operated by Exo in Repentigny, Quebec, Canada, a suburb north of Montreal. It is served by the Mascouche line.

The station possesses a single side platform, although two tracks pass through it; the second is used by non-stopping freight traffic branching off on the Canadian National Joliette Subdivision. The platform is a high-level platform, a feature shared only with Central Station, Terrebonne, and Mascouche stations on the commuter train network.

The platform runs along Rue Ricard, underneath a viaduct carrying Quebec Autoroute 40. There are three exits. A short staircase exits from the south end of the platform onto Rue Ricard; a walkway passes from the north end of the platform under Boul. Pierre-Le Gardeur to a small parking lot on Place des Roseaux; and the main parking lot and bus loop are located on the east side of the tracks on Boulevard Lacombe.

The station features an enclosed overhead bridge passing over the tracks to the main parking lot, with stair and elevator access. As a result, the station is wheelchair-accessible. The east side of the structure features an artwork by Nicolas Baier, L'Arbre de la gare.

== Connecting bus routes ==
Exo L'Assomption sector
No.	Route	Connects to	Services times / notes
5	Repentigny Station Shuttle	Terminus Repentigny	Weekdays, peak only
9	Charlemagne - CHLPG - Terrebonne	Terminus Repentigny	Daily
14	L'Assomption - Repentigny - Le Gardeur	Terminus Repentigny	Daily
100	L'Assomption - Repentigny - Charlemagne - Montreal	Honoré-Beaugrand; Radisson	Weekdays only
