= Exo Sorel-Varennes sector =

- Parent: Exo
- Founded: 2017
- Service area: Sorel, Verchères, Varennes, Contrecoeur, Saint-Amable
- Service type: bus service, paratransit, on-demand taxibus
- Routes: 13
- Destinations: Longueuil, Montreal
- Hubs: Terminus Longueuil, Terminus Contrecoeur, Terminus Sorel
- Annual ridership: 722,776 (2024)

The Exo Sorel-Varennes sector, formally the Conseil Intermunicipal de Transport Sorel-Varennes, is the division of Exo that delivers bus service to the municipalities in the area northeast from Montreal along the right bank of the Saint Lawrence River in Quebec, Canada. The communities served stretch downstream along Quebec Highway 132, from Varennes through Saint-Amable, Verchères, Contrecoeur and Sorel.

== Services ==
=== Local bus routes ===
Local routes
No.	Route	Connects to	Service times / notes
370	Sainte-Amable - Sainte-Julie	Terminus Sainte-Julie	Weekdays only

=== Express / regional bus routes ===
Express / regional routes
No.	Route	Connects to	Service times / notes
532	Express Varennes / Radisson	Radisson	Weekdays only
700	Sorel Tracy - Longueuil	Longueuil–Université-de-Sherbrooke; Terminus De Montarville	Daily
701	Contrecoeur - Longueuil	Longueuil–Université-de-Sherbrooke; Terminus Contrecoeur	Daily
707	Contrecoeur - Varennes (Jean-Coutu) - Longueuil	Longueuil–Université-de-Sherbrooke; Terminus Contrecoeur	Weekdays, peak only
709	Contrecoeur - Longueuil	Longueuil–Université-de-Sherbrooke; Terminus Contrecoeur	Daily
710	Verchères - Longueuil	Longueuil–Université-de-Sherbrooke	Only one departure per direction, weekdays peak only
720	Varennes - Longueuil	Longueuil–Université-de-Sherbrooke; Terminus De Montarville	Daily
721	Varennes - Longueuil	Longueuil–Université-de-Sherbrooke; Terminus De Montarville	Weekdays, peak only
722	Varennes - Longueuil	Longueuil–Université-de-Sherbrooke; Terminus De Montarville	Weekdays, peak only
723	Varennes (IREQ) - Longueuil	Longueuil–Université-de-Sherbrooke	Weekdays only
731	Saint-Amable - Longueuil	Longueuil–Université-de-Sherbrooke	Weekdays, peak only
732	Saint-Amable - Longueuil	Longueuil–Université-de-Sherbrooke	Weekdays, peak only

== See also ==
- Exo bus services
