= Saint-Jean-sur-Richelieu public transit =

Saint-Jean-sur-Richelieu transport en commun
- Founded: 2003
- Locale: Saint-Jean-sur-Richelieu
- Service type: bus service, taxibus
- Routes: 10 bus routes and taxibus areas
- Stations: Terminus 700, rue Boucher
- Operator: Transdev
- Website: Transport en commun

Saint-Jean-sur-Richelieu public transit (transport en commun) is operated on behalf of the city of Saint-Jean-sur-Richelieu in the province of Quebec, Canada. The city lies on the Richelieu River about 50 kilometres (31 mi) southeast of Montreal, and is the regional capital of Haut-Richelieu Regional County Municipality. Gestrans is the contracted manager of the transportation system with the buses for both local and commuter services being operated by Transdev.

== Services ==
Intercity bus routes operate between Terminus Carrefour Richelieu at 600, rue Pierre-Caisse in Saint-Jean-sur-Richelieu and Panama or Brossard Réseau express métropolitain (REM) stations. Six routes provide local bus service for the core areas of Saint-Jean-sur-Richelieu, Saint-Luc, Iberville, Saint-Athanase and L'Acadie. There is also a taxibus system which operates within designated sectors and synchronizes with the scheduled routes.

The City of Saint-Jean-sur-Richelieu is the agency mandated to provide transportation for people with disabilities throughout the Region of Haut-Richelieu. To be eligible, interested individuals must first submit a request to that effect and attach the required documents.

Until 2026, all intercity buses would go to Terminus Centre-Ville located at 1000 de La Gauchetière in downtown Montreal, with direct access there to the Bonaventure station on the Montreal Metro. In September 2024, the city of Saint-Jean-sur-Richelieu announced that their regional bus lines would terminate at REM stations when the stations between Montreal Central Station and Deux-Montagnes were set to open in late 2025, citing lesser costs and shorter travel times compared to ending in Downtown Montreal. After being postponed, buses stopped serving downtown Montreal on April 30, 2026.

== Bus routes ==
Saint-Jean-sur-Richelieu bus routes
No.	Local Routes
10	Ligne bleue
20	Ligne jaune
30	Ligne orange
40	Ligne rouge
50	Ligne verte
No.	Intercity Routes
96A	Panama station / Saint-Jean-sur-Richelieu via A30; stops on Route 104.
96E	Brossard station / Saint-Jean-sur-Richelieu Express, with stops along boulevard du Séminaire and boulevard Saint-Luc.
96S	Brossard station / Saint-Jean-sur-Richelieu Super Express; does not make any stops.

== See also ==
- Exo bus services
