= Terminus Terrebonne =

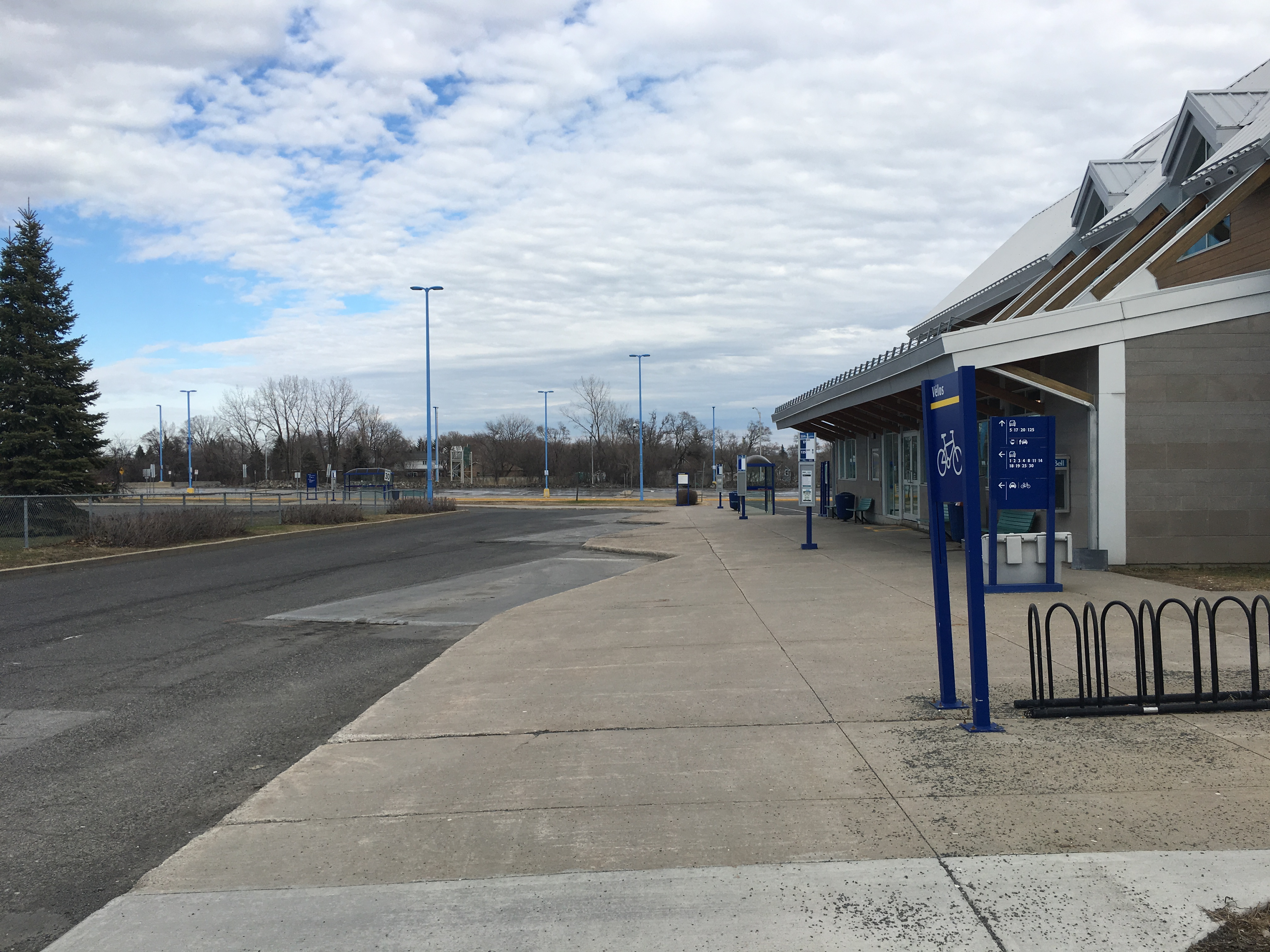

General information
- Location: 4800, chemin Côte-Terrebonne, Terrebonne, QC
- Coordinates: 45°41′53″N 73°39′13″W
- Operator: Exo
- Bus stands: 18
- Bus operators: Exo bus services; Transport MRC de Joliette

Construction
- Parking: 836 places
- Cycle facilities: 29 places bicycle stand

Other information
- Fare zone: ARTM: C
- Website: TERREBONNE

Passengers
- 2016: 2,191,400 (Exo)
Location

Terminus Terrebonne is a bus terminus served by Exo bus services.

== Connecting bus routes ==
Exo Terrebonne-Mascouche sector
No.	Route	Connects to	Service times / notes	Terminus wing and gate
1	Terrebonne - Mascouche		Same line as line 41	11
2	Terrebonne - Mascouche	Mascouche	Daily	10
3	Terrebonne - Mascouche		Daily	9
4	Terrebonne - Mascouche		Weekdays only	8
5	Terrebonne - Bois-des-Filion		Same line as line 45	3
8	Terrebonne - Centre Sector		Daily	8
9	Terrebonne - West Sector		Weekdays only	19
11	Terrebonne - Lachenaie		Daily	6
14	Terrebonne - La Plaine		Daily	7
17	Terrebonne - Mascouche		Daily	1
18	Terrebonne - Cité du Sport - Cégep de Terrebonne		Daily	5
19	Terrebonne - Terminus Montmorency	Montmorency	Daily	13
20	Terrebonne - Mascouche		Daily	4
21	Terrebonne - Mascouche		Weekdays, peak only	17 & 2
25	Terrebonne - Montreal	Pie-IX BRT; Henri-Bourassa	Weekdays, peak only	12
25B	Terrebonne - Terminus Montmorency	Pie-IX BRT	Weekdays evenings and weekends only	12
27	Terrebonne - Cité du Sport - Cégep de Terrebonne		Weekdays, peak only	18
30	Gare Mascouche - Terrebonne - Terminus Radisson	Mascouche; Radisson	Daily	15 & 2
45	Terrebonne - Bois-des-Filion		Same line as line 5	2
Exo bus services	exo à la demande Terrebonne		Weekdays only; Reserve in real time; Reservations via exo transport à la demande mobile app	Taxi
Exo Laurentides sector
610	Sainte-Thérèse - Terrebonne	Rosemère; Sainte-Thérèse	Daily	3
Exo Transport adapté
No.	Route	Connects to	Service times / notes	Terminus wing and gate
TA ♿︎	Exo Transport adapté			Taxi
Transport MRC de Joliette
No.	Route	Connects to	Service times / notes	
125	Saint-Donat - Montreal	Radisson		1
TA ♿︎	MRCJ Transport adapté			Taxi

== See also ==
- List of park and rides in Greater Montreal
