= Papineau Gérin-Lajoie Le Blanc =

Canadian architectural firm

Papineau Gérin-Lajoie Le Blanc was a Canadian architectural firm based in Montreal, Quebec. The firm was formed by Louis-Joseph Papineau (b. 1930), Guy Gérin-Lajoie (1928–2015), and Michel Le Blanc (1930–2015).

The firm's records are held at the Canadian Centre for Architecture in Montreal as the PGL architectes fonds.

== Gallery of works ==
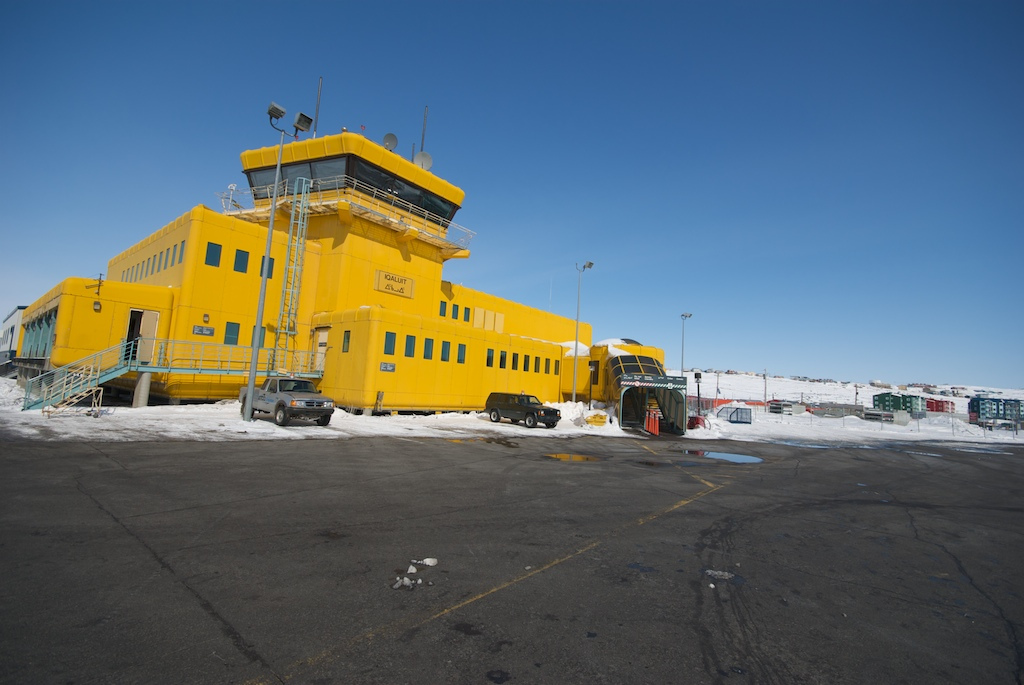
Iqaluit Airport

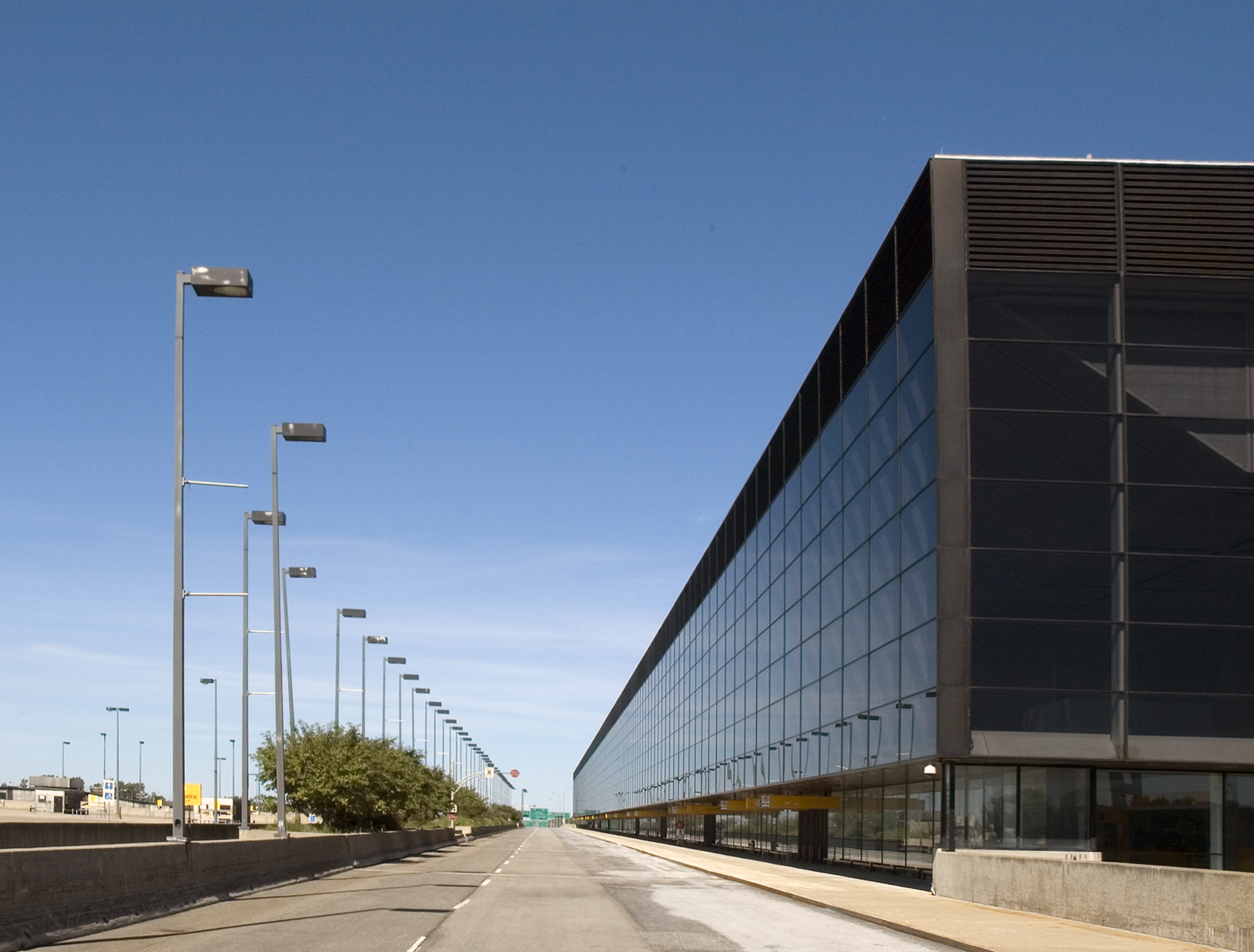
Montréal–Mirabel International Airport

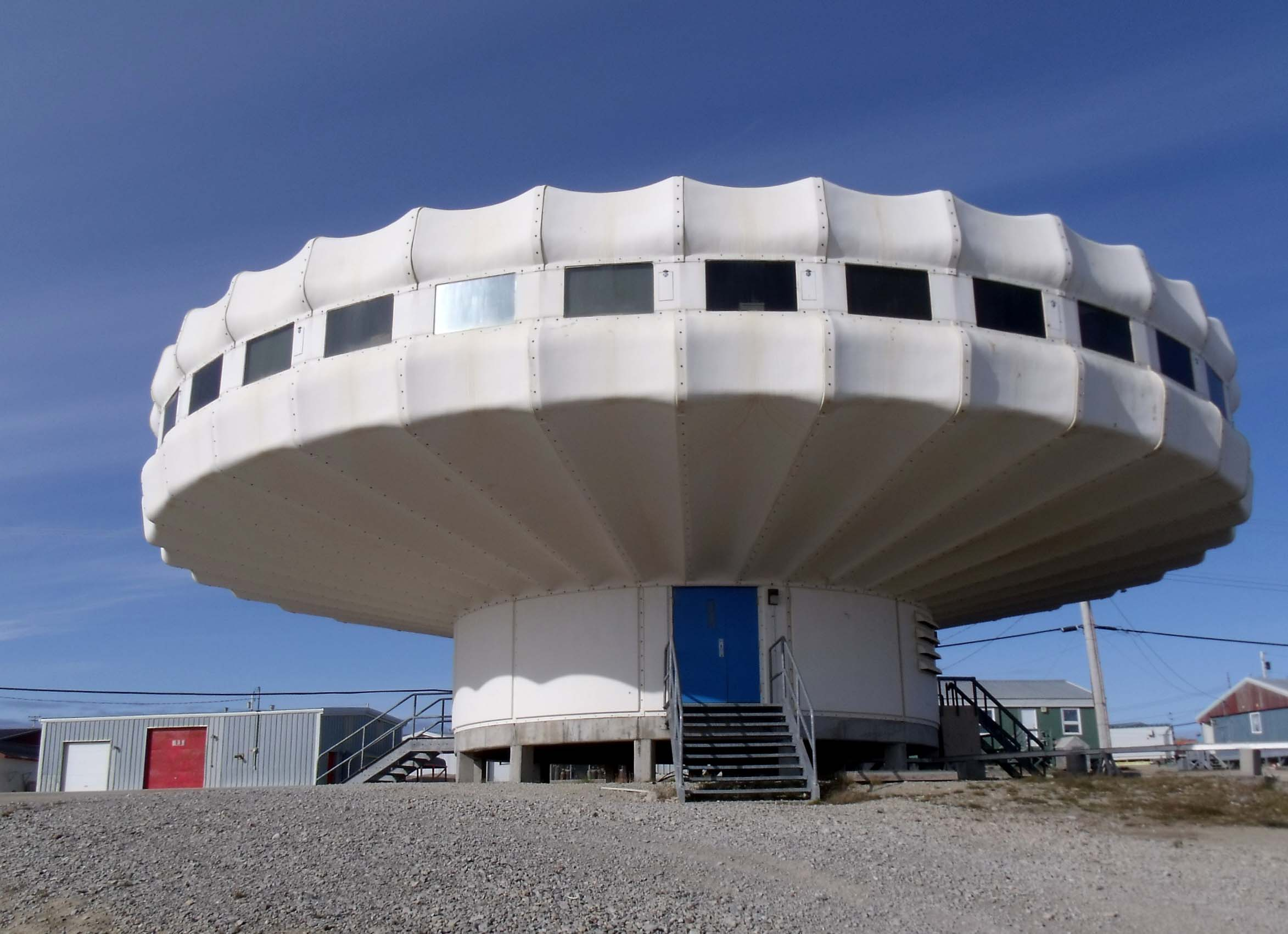
Igloolik Research Centre

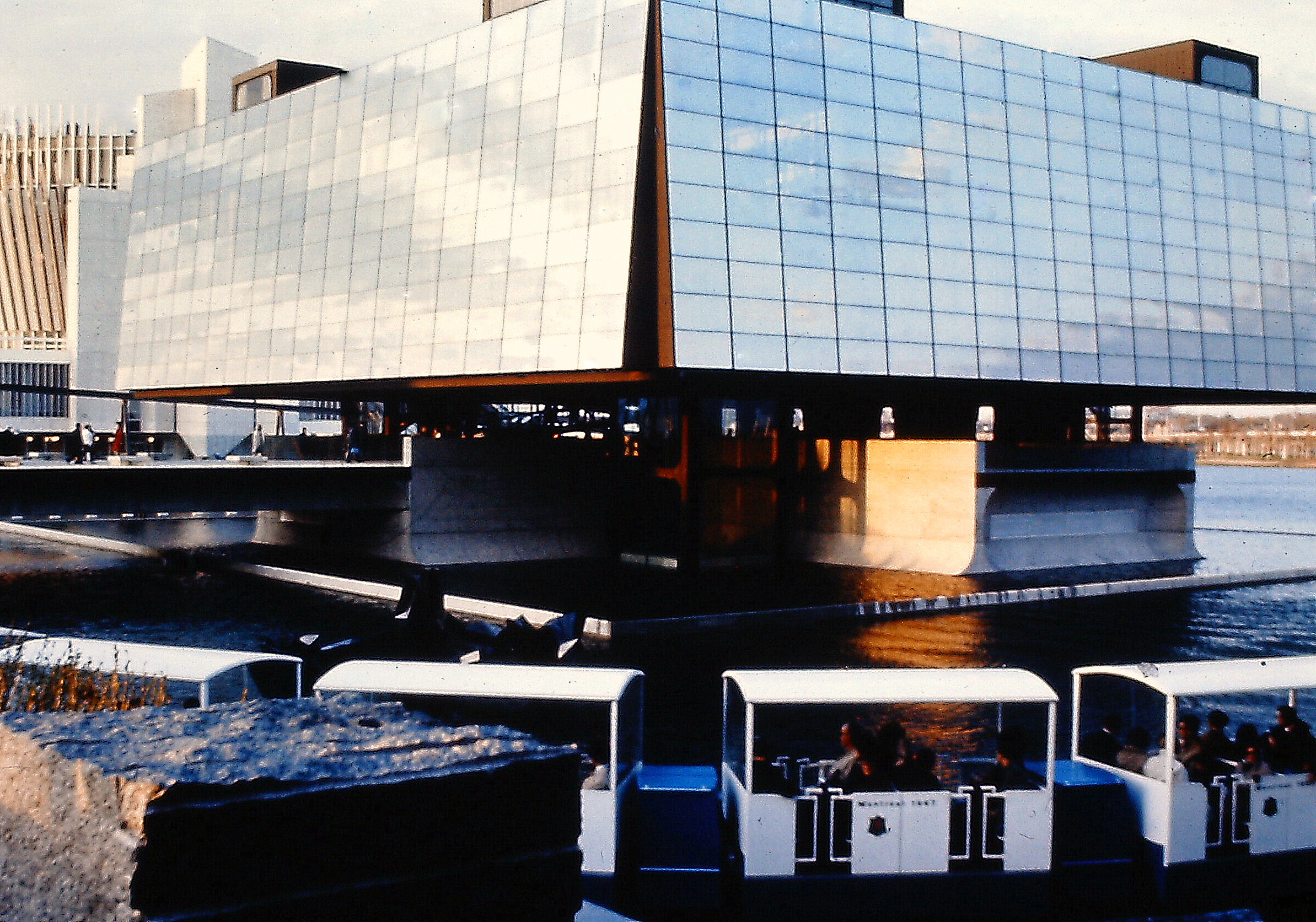
Québec Pavilion

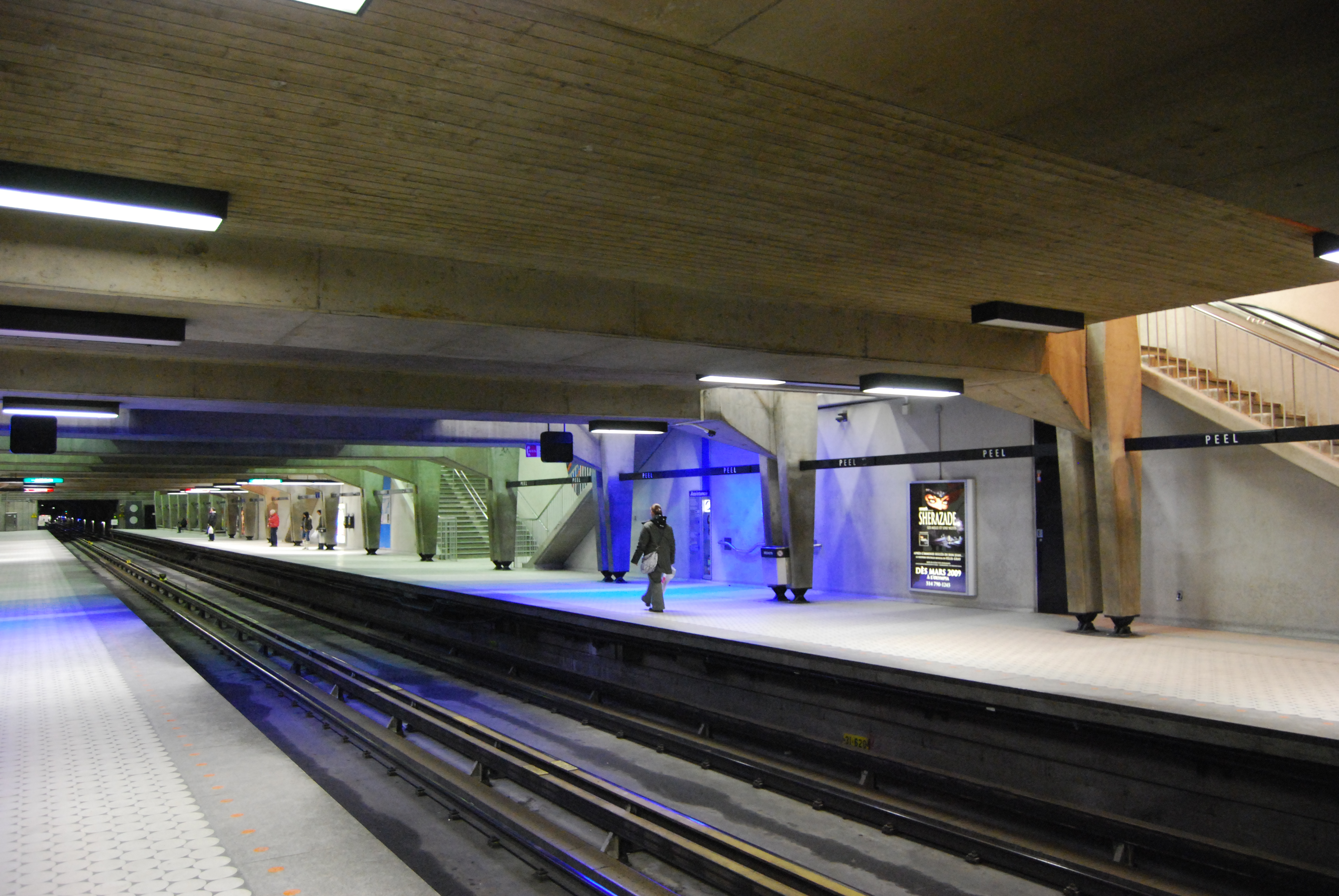
Peel station (Montreal Metro)

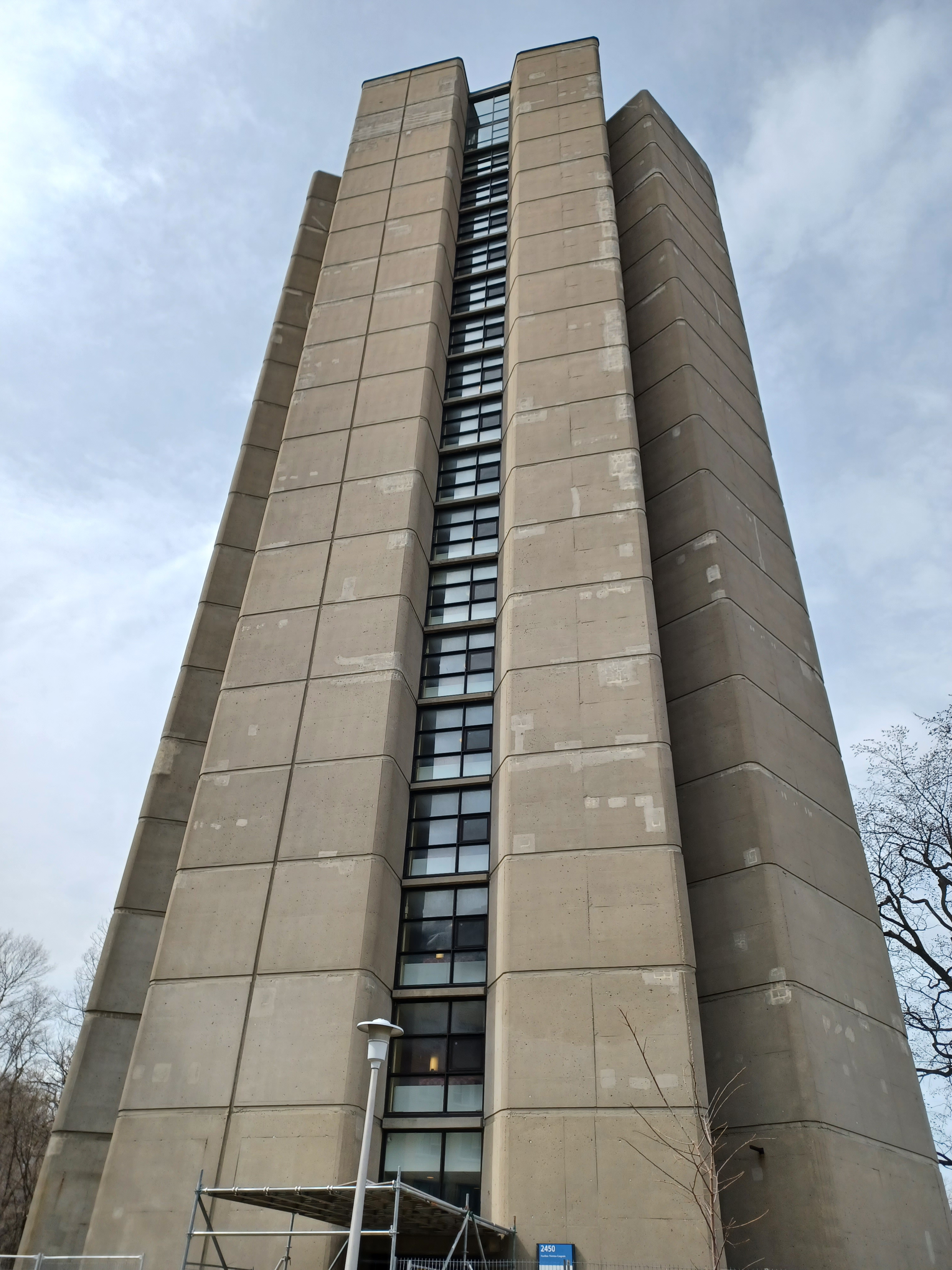
Pavillon Thérèse-Casgrain (Université de Montréal)

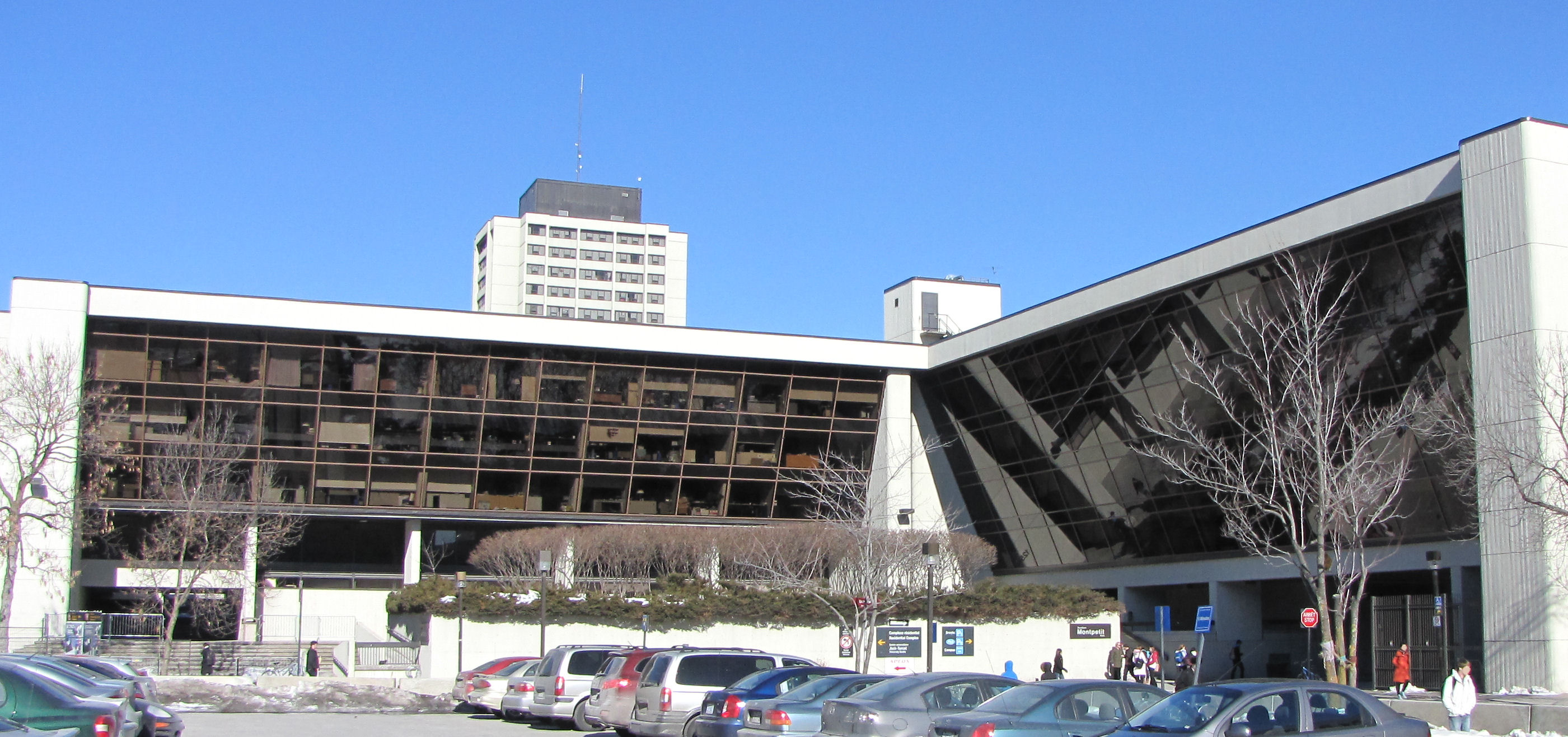
Montpetit Hall, University of Ottawa

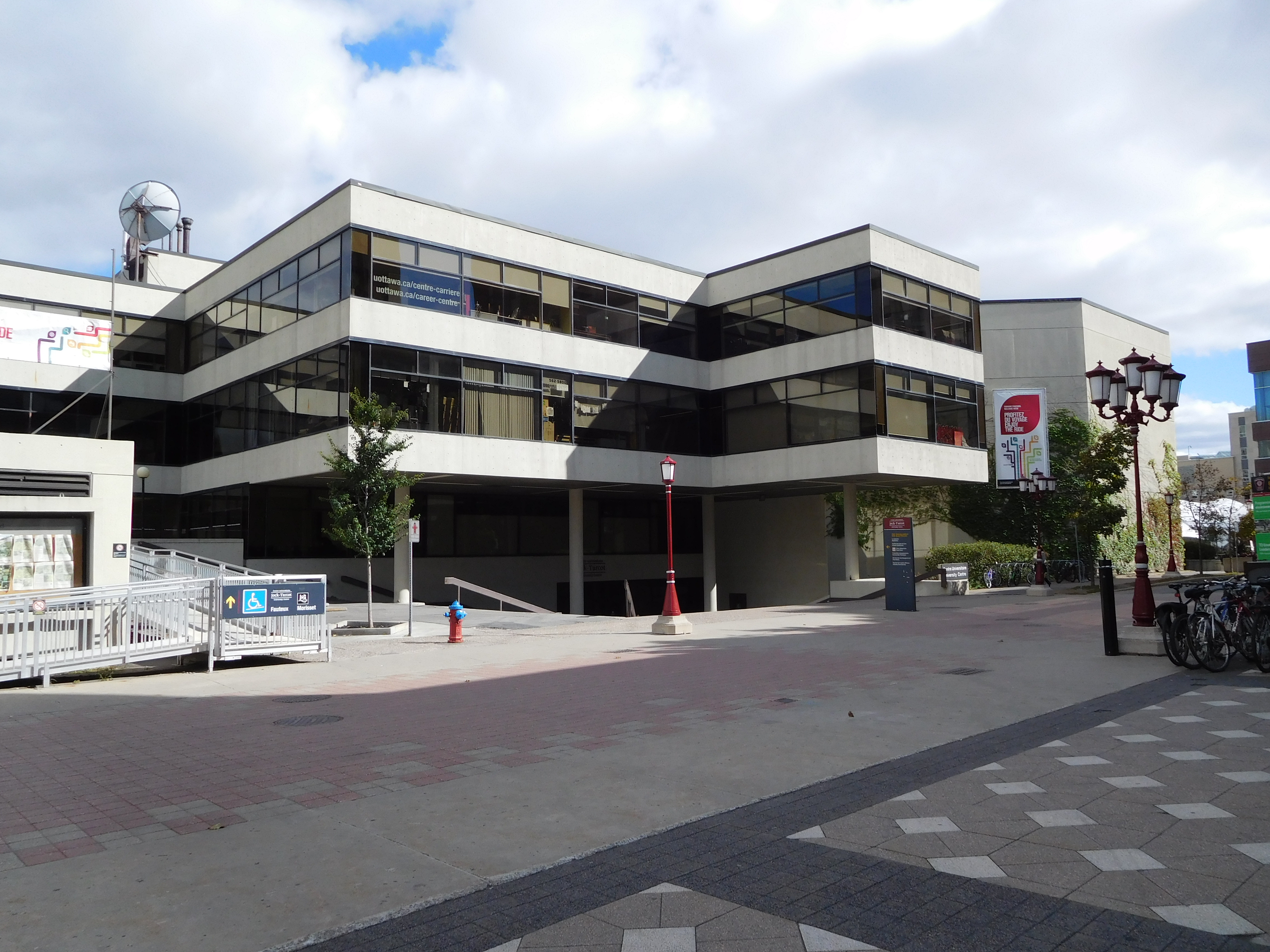
Jock Turcot University Centre, University of Ottawa

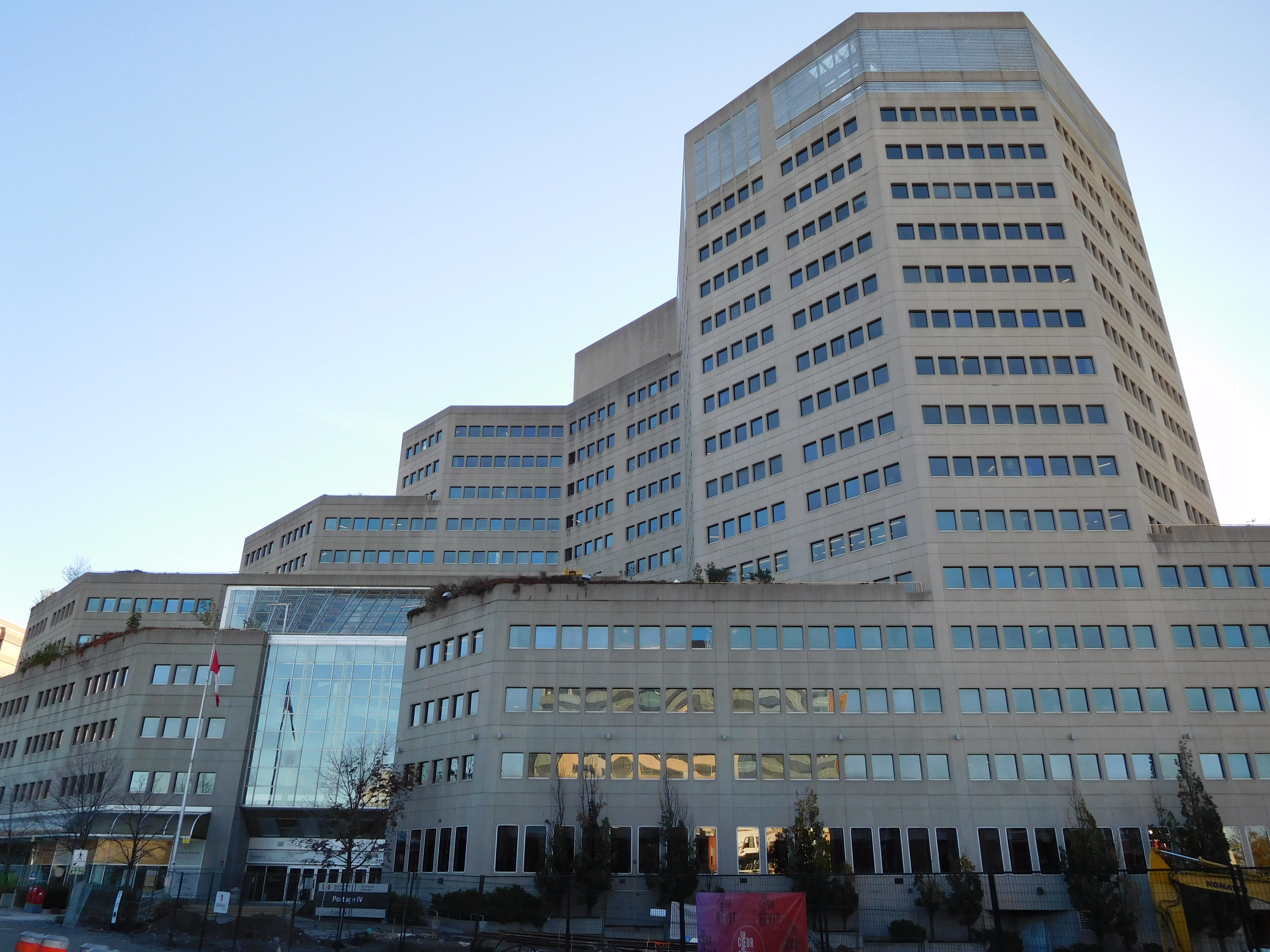
Place du Portage IV

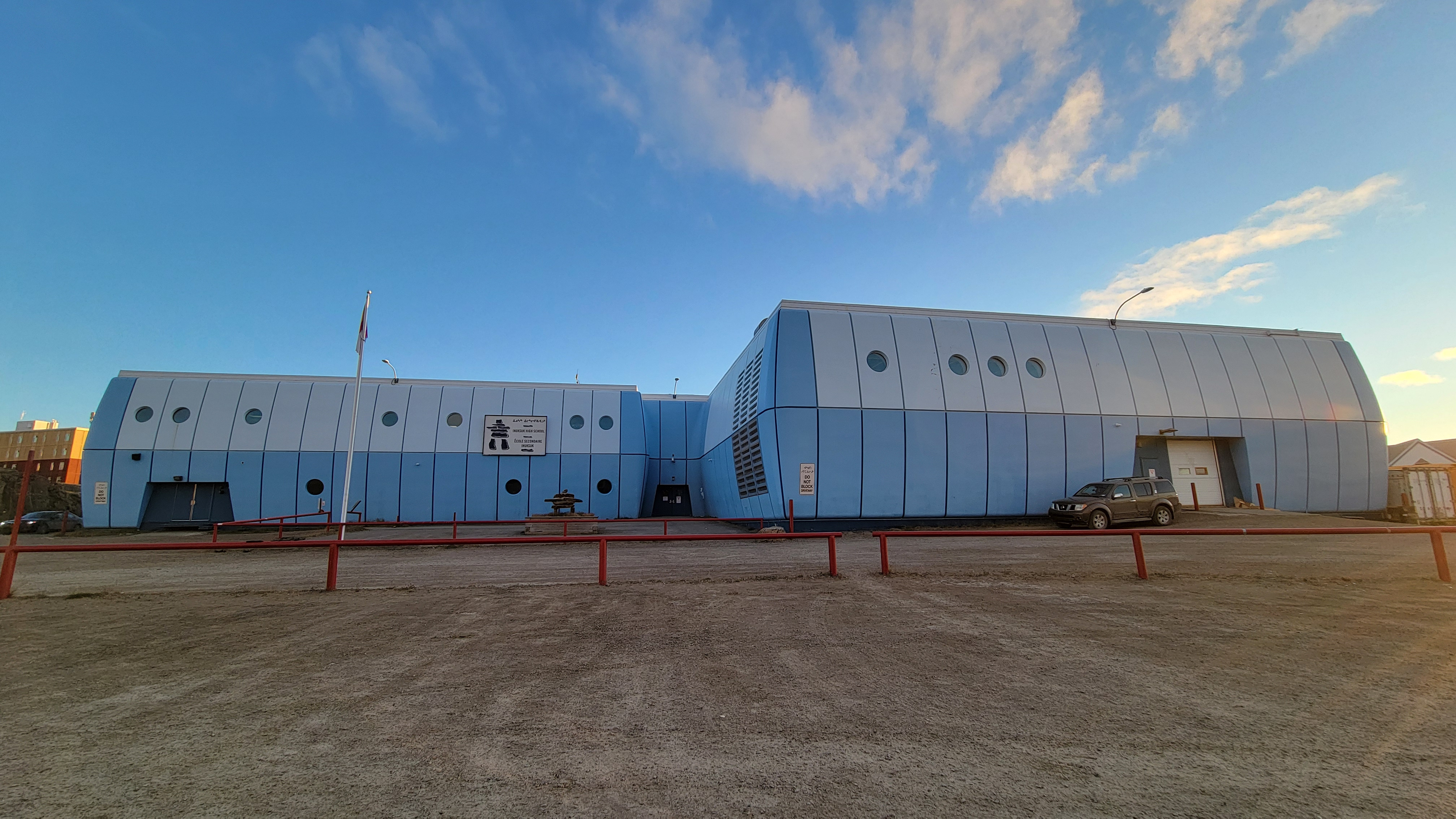
Inuksuk High School

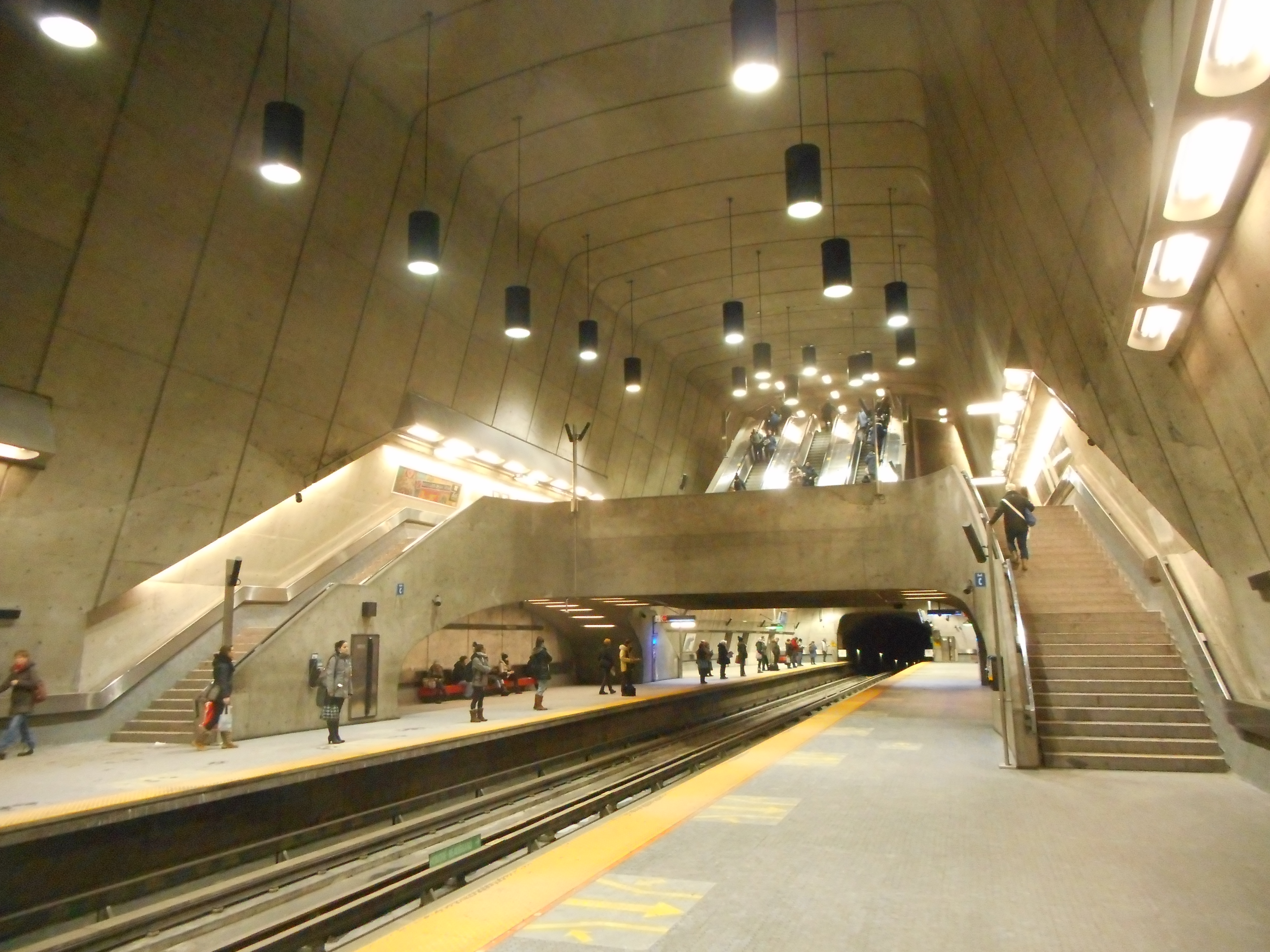
Radisson station
