= Repentigny =

- City
- Ville de Repentigny
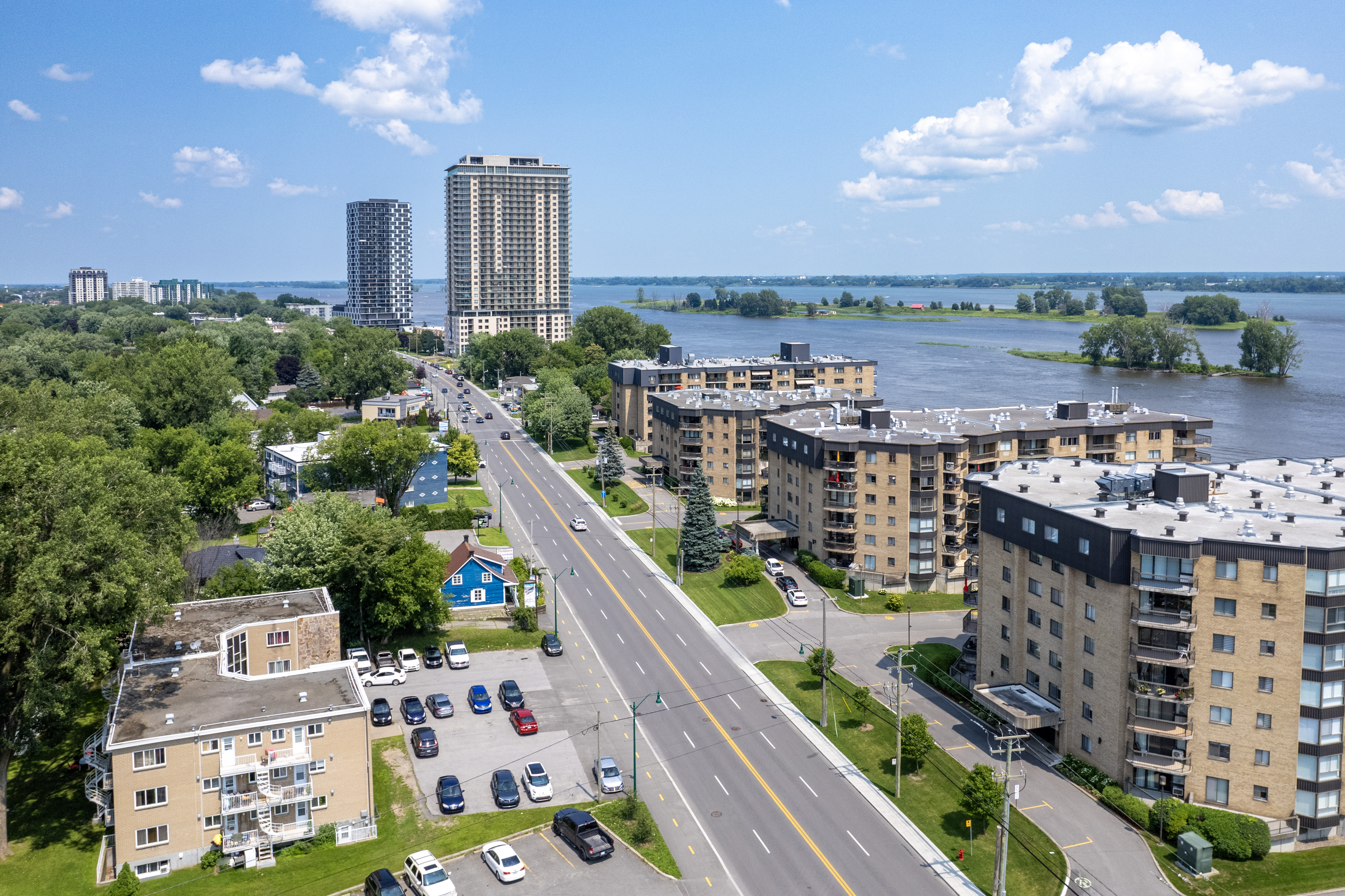

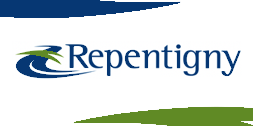
- Flag Coat of arms

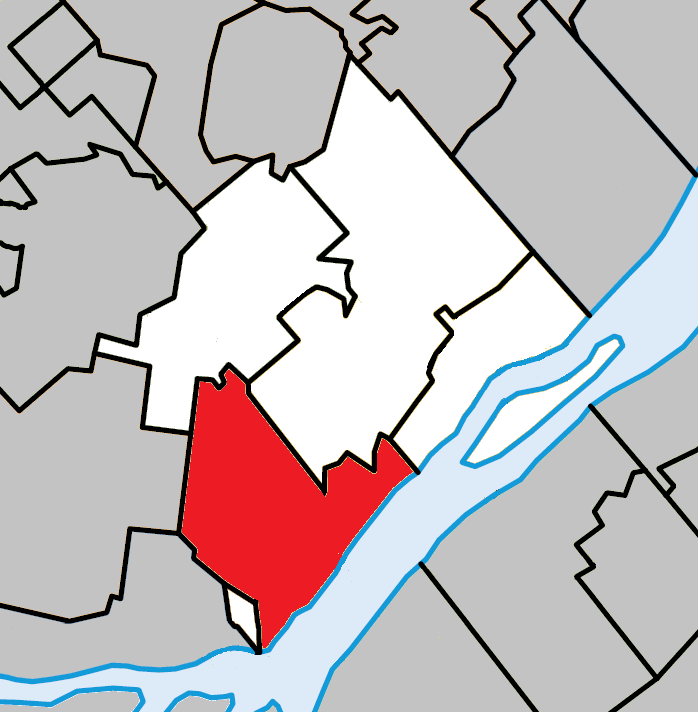
- Location within L'Assomption RCM

- Location in central Quebec
- Coordinates: 45°44′N 73°28′W
- Country: Canada
- Province: Quebec
- Region: Lanaudière
- RCM: L'Assomption
- Founded: 1670
- Constituted: June 1, 2002

Government
  - Mayor: Nicolas Dufour
  - MP: Monique Pauzé (BQ)
  - MNAs: Pascale Déry (CAQ); François Legault (CAQ)

Area
  - Total: 70.95 km^{2} (27.39 sq mi)
  - Land: 61.52 km^{2} (23.75 sq mi)

Population (2021)
  - Total: 86,100
  - Density: 1,399.6/km^{2} (3,625/sq mi)
  - Change 2016–21: ▲2.2%
  - Dwellings: 34,710
- Time zone: UTC−5 (EST)
  - Summer (DST): UTC−4 (EDT)
- Postal code(s): J5Y, J5Z, J6A
- Area codes: 450, 579
- Highways A-40: R-138 R-341; R-344
- Website: www.ville.repentigny.qc.ca

Repentigny (French pronunciation: [ʁəpɑ̃tiɲi]) is an off-island suburb of Montreal, Quebec, Canada. It is located north of the city on the lower end of the L'Assomption River, and on the St. Lawrence River. Repentigny and Charlemagne were the first towns off the eastern tip of the Island of Montreal. Repentigny is part of the Lanaudière region.

Repentigny was also the western terminus of the Chemin du Roy, a road that extends eastward towards Quebec City.

== History ==
Antoine-Jetté windmill, built in 1823

In 1647, the area was granted as a seignory by Jean Talon to Pierre Legardeur de Repentigny. In 1670, the seignory was sold in part to Charles Aubert de La Chesnaye, while the son of Pierre Legardeur, Jean-Baptiste Legardeur de Repentigny, built a large dwelling at the mouth of the L'Assomption River in the remaining part of the seignory, marking the start of the settlement. During the town's first 250 years, Repentigny was only inhabited by a few hundred peasants, or habitants, and was an agricultural community. In 1677, the first population census only shows 30 inhabitants.

In 1845, the Parish Municipality of Repentigny was founded, abolished in 1847, and reestablished in 1855. Its first mayor was Benjamin Moreau in 1855. In 1857, it lost part of its territory when the Parish Municipality of Saint-Paul-l'Ermite (renamed to Le Gardeur in 1978) was formed.

In 1957, Repentigny changed its status from parish municipality to city.

Repentigny merged with its neighbouring city of Le Gardeur on June 1, 2002. The city's area grew from 29 km^{2} (11 sq mi) to 69 km^{2} (27 sq mi) and the population grew by 70%.

== Demographics ==
In the 2021 Census of Population conducted by Statistics Canada, Repentigny had a population of 86,100 living in 34,174 of its 34,710 total private dwellings, a change of 2.2% from its 2016 population of 84,285. With a land area of 61.52 km^{2} (23.75 sq mi), it had a population density of 1,399.5/km^{2} (3,624.8/sq mi) in 2021.

Historical census populations – Repentigny

Year	Pop.	±%
1871	880	—
1881	813	−7.6%
1891	693	−14.8%
1901	611	−11.8%
1911	639	+4.6%
1921	673	+5.3%
1931	628	−6.7%
1941	862	+37.3%

Year	Pop.	±%
1951	1,355	+57.2%
1956	2,334	+72.3%
1961	9,139	+291.6%
1966	14,976	+63.9%
1971	19,520	+30.3%
1976	26,698	+36.8%
1981	34,419	+28.9%
1986	40,778	+18.5%

Year	Pop.	±%
1991	49,630	+21.7%
1996	53,824	+8.5%
2001	54,550	+1.3%
2006	76,237	+39.8%
2011	82,000	+7.6%
2016	84,285	+2.8%
2021	86,100	+2.2%

Population counts are not adjusted for boundary changes and mergers.
Source: Statistics Canada

=== Ethnicity ===
In 2021, Repentigny was 81.4% white/European, 17.6% visible minorities, and 1.0% Indigenous. The largest visible minority groups were Black (9.9%), Arab (3.3%), and Latin American (2.2%).

Panethnic groups in the City of Repentigny (2001−2021)
Panethnic group	2021		2016		2011		2006		2001	
Panethnic group	Pop.	%	Pop.	%	Pop.	%	Pop.	%	Pop.	%
European (Note: Statistic includes all persons that did not make up part of a visible minority or an indigenous identity.)	69,170	81.39%	72,695	87.47%	74,950	92.11%	72,380	95.58%	53,245	98.14%
African	8,385	9.87%	5,880	7.07%	3,675	4.52%	1,735	2.29%	520	0.96%
Middle Eastern (Note: Statistic includes total responses of "West Asian" and "Arab" under visible minority section on census.)	3,475	4.09%	1,560	1.88%	805	0.99%	370	0.49%	35	0.06%
Latin American	1,895	2.23%	1,230	1.48%	650	0.8%	425	0.56%	115	0.21%
Indigenous	885	1.04%	820	0.99%	575	0.71%	310	0.41%	135	0.25%
Southeast Asian (Note: Statistic includes total responses of "Filipino" and "Southeast Asian" under visible minority section on census.)	420	0.49%	405	0.49%	320	0.39%	230	0.3%	75	0.14%
East Asian (Note: Statistic includes total responses of "Chinese", "Korean", and "Japanese" under visible minority section on census.)	330	0.39%	275	0.33%	165	0.2%	240	0.32%	135	0.25%
South Asian	65	0.08%	65	0.08%	45	0.06%	10	0.01%	10	0.02%
Other/multiracial (Note: Statistic includes total responses of "Visible minority, n.i.e." and "Multiple visible minorities" under visible minority section on census.)	355	0.42%	190	0.23%	160	0.2%	50	0.07%	20	0.04%
Total responses	84,985	98.7%	83,110	98.61%	81,370	99.23%	75,730	99.33%	54,255	99.46%
Total population	86,100	100%	84,285	100%	82,000	100%	76,237	100%	54,550	100%
Note: Totals greater than 100% due to multiple origin responses

2021 ethnic origins	Percent
Canadian	33.0%
French n.o.s	20.1%
Québécois	12.8%
French Canadian	6.8%
Haitian	6.3%
Italian	4.0%
Irish	3.7%
Arab n.o.s	1.8%
African n.o.s	1.6%
Algerian	1.4%
Moroccan	1.3%
Caucasian (White) n.o.s	1.3%
First Nations n.o.s	1.2%
Scottish	1.2%
English	1.1%
Acadian	1.0%
Berber	1.0%
Note: Includes multiple responses

=== Language ===
As of 2021, 85.8% of residents spoke French as their mother tongue. Other common first languages were Spanish (2.3%), Arabic (2.0%), Haitian Creole (1.8%), English (1.7%), Kabyle (0.7%), and Italian (0.6%). 1.6% of residents listed both French and a non-official language as mother tongues, while 0.9% listed both French and English.

Canada Census mother tongue - Repentigny, Quebec
Census	Total	French			English			French & English			Other		
Year	Responses	Count	Trend	Pop %	Count	Trend	Pop %	Count	Trend	Pop %	Count	Trend	Pop %
2021	85,690	73,520	▼2.1%	85.79%	1,420	▲3.2%	1.66%	785	▲101.2%	0.92%	8,295	▲39.6%	9.68%
2016	84,285	75,165	▼0.026%	89.73%	1,375	▲9.45%	1.64%	390	▼24.35%	0.46%	5,940	▲32,4%	7.04%
2011	81,535	75,185	▲5.07%	92.21%	1,245	▲18.57%	1.53%	485	▲110.86%	0.59%	4,015	▲39.17%	4.92%
2006	76,237	71,555	▲36.39%	93.86%	1,050	▲65.35%	1.37%	230	▲84%	0.3%	2,885	▲177.4%	3.78%
2001	54,550	52,460	▲1.8%	96.17%	635	▼26.59%	1.16%	125	▼40.47%	0.23%	1,040	▲20.93%	1.91%
1996	53,570	51,520	n/a	96.17%	865	n/a	1.61%	210	n/a	0.39%	860	n/a	1.61%

=== Religion ===
In 2013, 70.3% of the population was Christian, down from 89.3% in 2011. 59.0% of residents were Catholic, 6.7% were Christian n.o.s, 1.6% were Protestant and 3.0% belonged to other Christian denominations or Christian-related traditions. Non-religious and secular people made up 23.3% of the population, up from 8.7% in 2011. 6.4% of residents followed other religions and spiritual traditions, up from 1.9% in 2011. The largest non-Christian religion was Islam, at 5.8% of the population.

== Government ==
City hall

List of former mayors:

- Benjamin Moreau (1855–1858)
- Louis Thouin (1858–1862)
- Ulric Deschamps (1862–1864)
- Antoine Deschamps (1864–1866)
- François Grenier (1866–1870)
- Amédée Meunier (1870–1875)
- Absalon Thouin (1875–1877)
- Joseph Hétu (1877–1880)
- Joseph Grenier (1880–1882)
- Napoléon Thifault (1882–1887)
- Eusèbe Juneau (1887–1899)
- Joseph-Napoléon Thouin (1899–1904)
- Ménard Nantais (1904–1905)
- Joseph Deschamps (1905–1908)
- J.-Oscar Beaudoin (1908–1911, 1929–1932, 1933–1935)
- Napoléon Provost (1911–1915)
- Stanilas Coiteux (1915–1919)
- Hector Grenier (1919–1929)
- Ulric Deschamps (1932–1933, 1935–1941)
- Jean-Baptiste Deschamps (1935)
- Rosaire Deschamps (1941–1949, 1953–1960)
- Agapit Nantais (1949–1953)
- Robert Lussier (1960–1968)
- Louis-Philippe Picard (1968–1987)
- Jacques Dupuis (1987–1993)
- Alain Brien (1993–1997)
- Chantal Deschamps (1997–2021)
- Nicolas Dufour (2021–present)

== Culture and events ==
Repentigny is home of many festivities:

- Festival de Feu et de Glace (Festival of Fire and Ice, a winter fest), January–February.
- Festival de spectacles jeune-public de Lanaudière (Youth theatre fest), early July.
- Rendez-Vous Estival (Summer Rendez-Vous, a theme park with familial activities and rock shows), early August.
- Festival Gospel (Gospel Fest, International gospel choirs fest), mid-August.
- National de Soccer (Soccer Nationals, 18- level national soccer event), mid-August.
- Internationaux de Tennis junior du Canada Banque Nationale (National Bank Junior Tennis Internationals of Canada, the biggest sports event in the city), late August-early September
- Fête du Petit-Village (Little town fest, cultural rendez-vous in the old Saint-Paul-l'Ermite sector), every two autumns.
- The Fête Nationale du Québec, la St-Jean, brings many activities, such as shows and performances on stage in L'île Lebel.
- Many outdoor shows and movie projections

== Infrastructure ==
Repentigny is the central point for transit in South-Central Lanaudière. Its Centre d'Échange Rive Nord-Est (Northeastern Shore Transit Exchange Centre), administered by Réseau de transport métropolitain, is the main infrastructure for transit in the region. Unlike a bus terminal, no departures are available from the Centre d'Échange, but transfers from one circuit to the other are possible. 9 of the 10 RTCR de la MRC de L'Assomption transit system circuits travel via Centre d'Échange, in addition to the 2 CRTL regional lines. Thus, Repentigny is directly connected to Terrebonne, Charlemagne, L'Assomption, Montreal, Montréal-Est, Saint-Sulpice, Lavaltrie, Lanoraie, Sainte-Geneviève-de-Berthier, Berthierville, La Visitation-de-l'Île-Dupas, Saint-Ignace-de-Loyola, Saint-Paul-d'Industrie, Crabtree, Sainte-Marie-Salomé and Joliette.

The city of Repentigny takes part in the L'Assomption MRC public transportation network effort and pan-regional Lanaudière Regional Transport Commission, linking all of the Regional County Municipalities of Lanaudière, even the northernmost ones. In addition there is the MRC Les Moulins.

Repentigny is connected to Montreal's Central Station by commuter rail via the Repentigny Station of Réseau de transport métropolitain's Mascouche Line.

== Education ==
Commission scolaire des Affluents operates francophone public schools

- Centre de formation professionnelle des Riverains (1971)
- Centre la Croisée
- École primaire Alphonse-Desjardins (1951)
- École primaire de la Paix (1988)
- École primaire des Moissons (1982)
- École primaire du Moulin (1986)
- École primaire Émile-Nelligan (1971)
- École primaire Entramis (1986)
- École primaire Henri-Bourassa (1966)
- École primaire Jean-Duceppe (1992)
- École primaire Jean-XXIII (1959)
- École primaire la Majuscule (1998)
- École primaire la Passerelle (1957)
- École primaire la Tourterelle (1991)
- École primaire le Bourg-Neuf (1989)
- École primaire Longpré (1962)
- École primaire Louis-Fréchette (1965)
- École primaire Louis-Joseph-Huot (1960)
- École primaire Marie-Victorin (1961)
- École primaire Pie-XII (1961)
- École primaire St-Paul (1956)
- École primaire Tournesol (1981)
- École primaire Valmont-sur-Parc (2016)
- École secondaire Félix-Leclerc (1992)
- École secondaire Jean-Baptiste-Meilleur (1963)
- École secondaire Jean-Claude-Crevier (1948)
- École secondaire l'Horizon (1988)

Sir Wilfrid Laurier School Board operates anglophone public school

- Franklin Hill Elementary School (2004)

== Notable people ==
- Julie Brosseau, women's basketball player
- Les Cowboys Fringants, Québécois folk-pop band
- Marie Deschamps, Canadian Supreme Court Justice
- Benoît Hogue, former NHL hockey player
- Joseph Juneau, co-founder of Juneau, Alaska
- Solomon Juneau, founder of Milwaukee, the largest city in the US state of Wisconsin
- Maxim Lapierre, former NHL hockey player
- Pascal Leclaire, former NHL hockey player
- Thomas Meilleur-Giguère, soccer player for Pacific FC
- Karl Ouimette, soccer player for the Atlético Ottawa
- Marie-Ève Pelletier, former professional tennis player
- Samuel Piette, soccer player for CF Montréal
- Jason Pominville, former NHL hockey player
- Mike Ruiz, fashion photographer and judge for Cycle 3 of Canada's Next Top Model
- Aurélie Tran, artistic gymnast and member of the Canadian national team

== See also ==
- List of cities in Quebec
- Municipal reorganization in Quebec
- North Shore (Montreal)
- Église Notre-Dame-des-Champs de Repentigny
