= Exo bus services =

Transit service in Montreal, Canada

Exo bus and paratransit network
- Icon used for Exo bus network

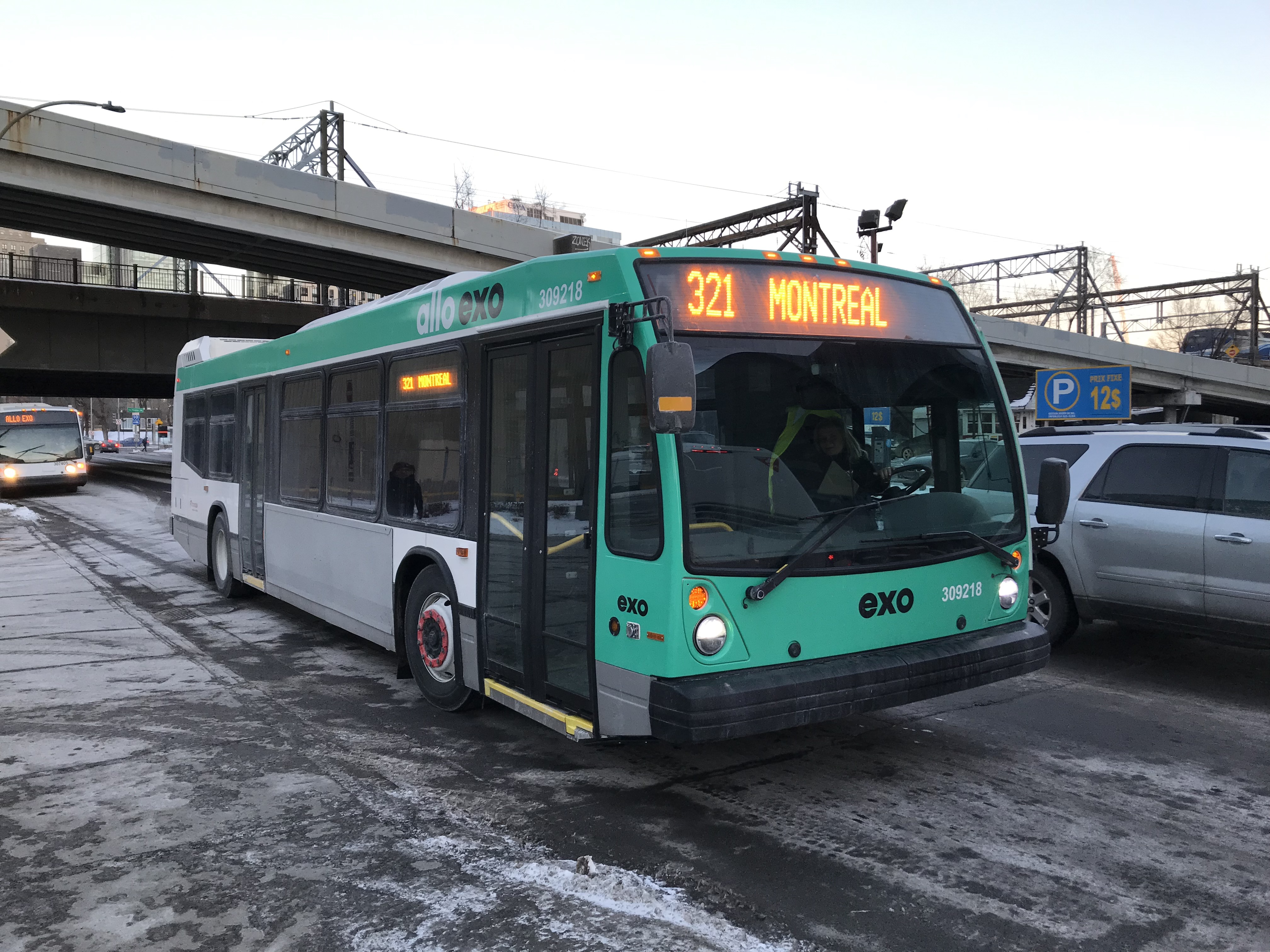
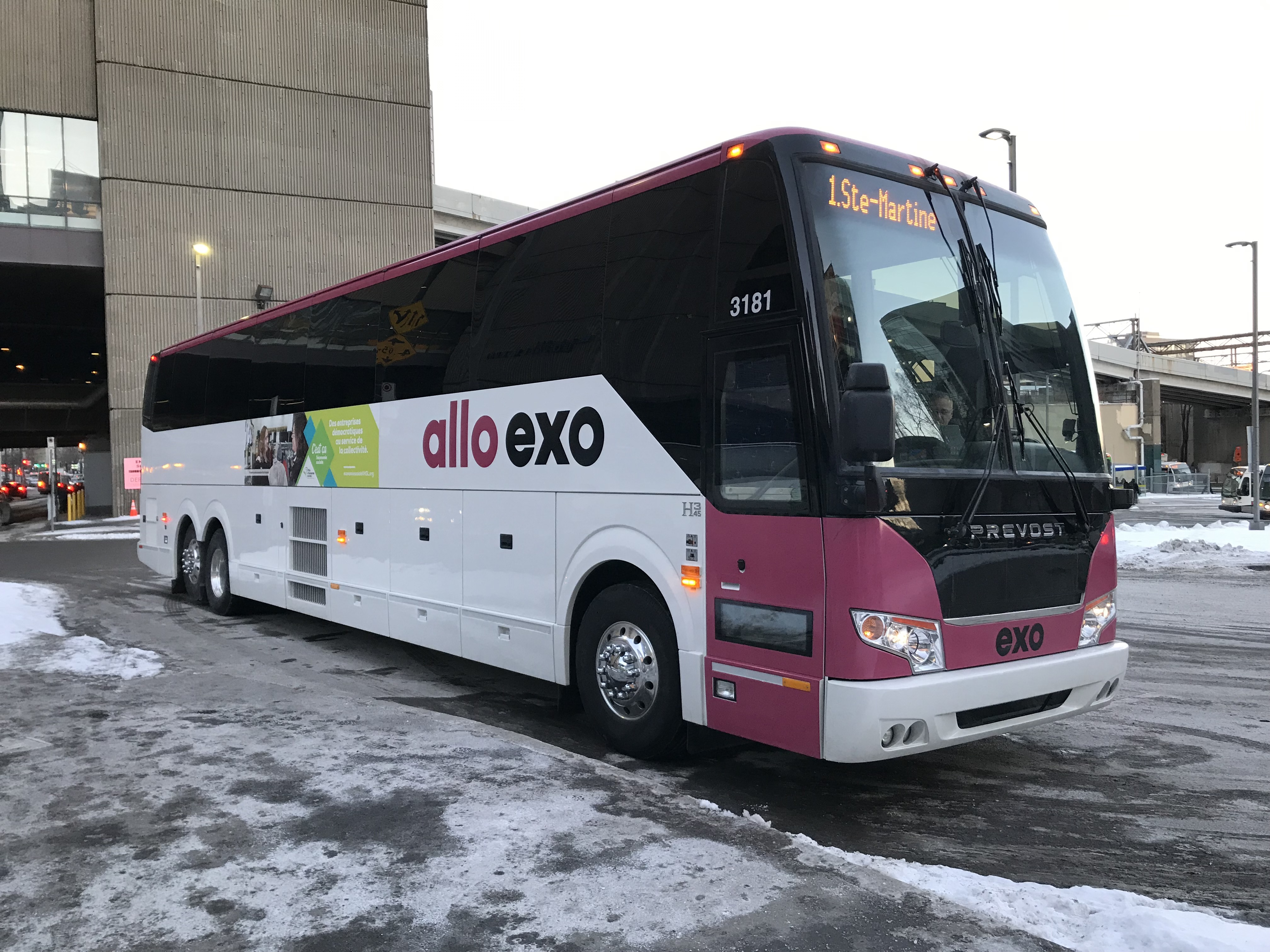
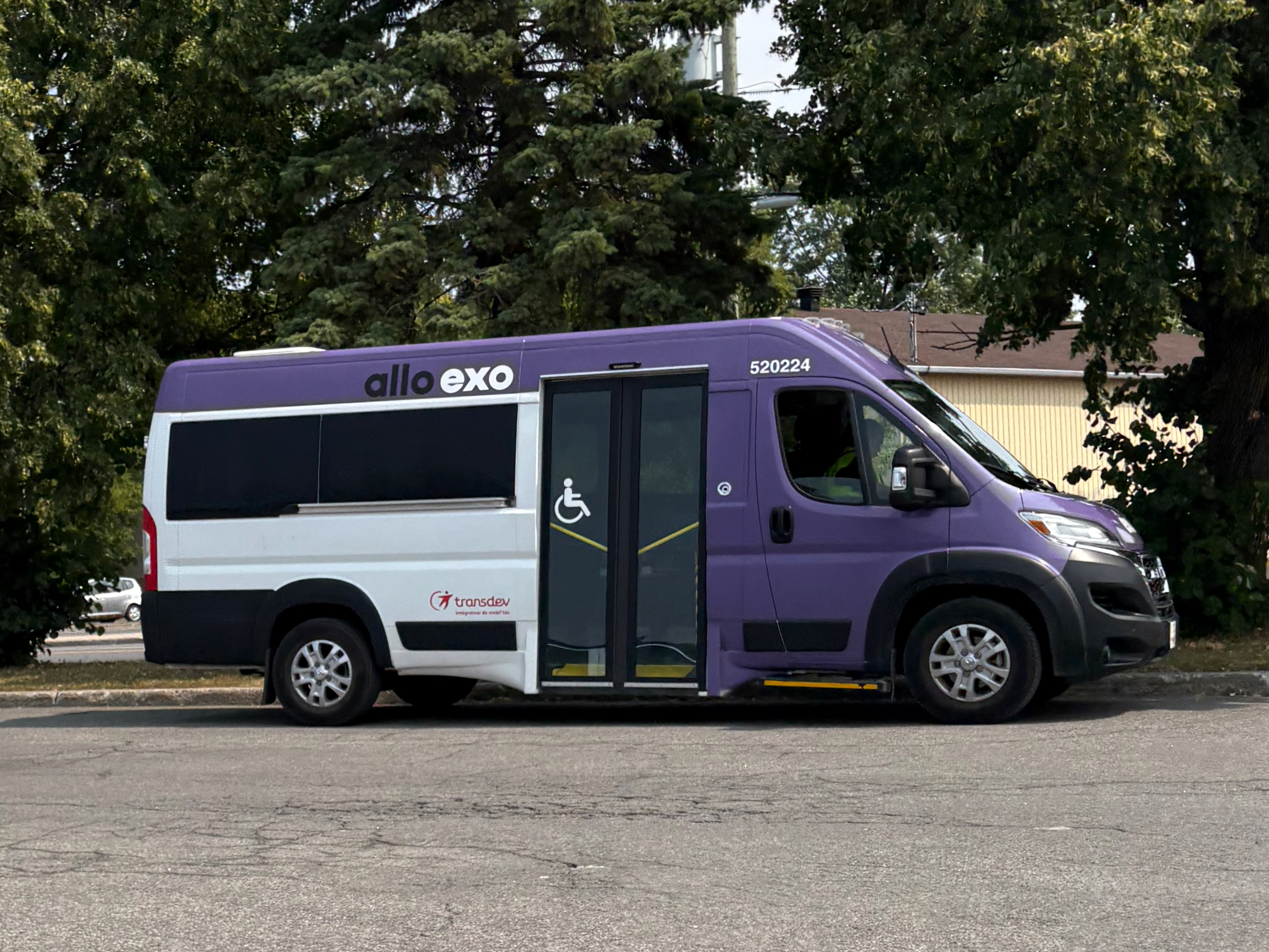
- An Exo-branded bus A motorcoach with Exo livery An Exo Wheelchair-accessible paratransit van
- Parent: Exo
- Founded: June 1, 2017
- Service area: Northern and southern suburbs of Greater Montreal
- Service type: Bus service; Paratransit; Taxibus; On-demand transit
- Routes: 214 bus lines; 72 taxibus lines; 4 on-demand areas
- Hubs: 13 terminuses
- Annual ridership: 16,613,172 on bus lines; 90,725 using on-demand; 736,451 using paratransit
- Website: exo.quebec
Map of Exo sectors

Exo provides 219 bus lines, on-demand transit and paratransit service throughout the outer suburbs and exurbs of the Greater Montreal region of Canada.

== History ==
Prior to June 2017, bus service within the greater region of Montréal was provided by a number of different municipal services and local transit agencies known as Conseils intermunicipaux de transport (intermunicipal boards of transport, or CIT). These local agencies were coordinated since 1997 by the Agence métropolitaine de transport (AMT).

On June 1, 2017, the Réseau de transport métropolitain (RTM), later rebranded Exo, took over service operation of twelve former CITs and local transit agencies:

- CIT Chambly-Richelieu-Carignan (CITCRC, branded as Blus)
- CIT Haut-Saint-Laurent (CITHSL)
- CIT La Presqu'Île
- CIT Laurentides (CITL)
- CIT Le Richelain
- CIT Roussillon
- CIT Sorel-Varennes (CITSV)
- CIT Vallée du Richelieu (CITVR)
- CIT Sud-Ouest (CITSO)
- Réseau de transport collectif régional (RTCR) de la MRC de L'Assomption
- MRC Les Moulins (branded as Urbis)
- Sainte-Julie municipal public transit

Progressively, paratransit non-profit organizations were integrated into Exo:

- TARSO (June 2020)
- Handi-Bus (October 2020)
- Soleil Transport (May 2021)
- Transport Accès (February 2022)

Exo piloted an on-demand bus service in McMasterville and Beloeil in June 2021. Service was expanded to Terrebonne in July 2022, to Mont-Saint-Hilaire and Otterburn Park in July 2024, and Boisbriand in November 2024.

In March 2022, the ARTM took over the Express d'Oka bus line between Saint-Placide and Saint-Eustache. It was integrated as line 744 in the Laurentides sector.

In 2023, when the Réseau express métropolitain began service on the South Shore, most Exo lines that ran along the Samuel-De Champlain Bridge had to be rerouted to either Panama or Brossard stations. Exo took the opportunity to redesign the bus networks in the Chambly-Richelieu-Carignan and Richelain / Roussillon sectors.

In October 2024 the Haut-Saint-Laurent sector was merged into the Sud-Ouest sector.

== Fares ==
As of July 1, 2024

Exo services operate within the integrated fare structure of the Autorité régionale de transport métropolitain (ARTM) for Greater Montreal. Exo bus sectors are exclusively in zones C and D, though some express or regional buses have destinations in zones A or B.

Certain sectors may have their own particularities, such as fare-free local travel.

Some municipalities served by Exo outside of the ARTM territory are charged as a Zone D fare, even if they are not on the ARTM's list.

== Services ==
Exo offers different types of bus services, depending on the service area, destinations, population density and proximity to rapid transit infrastructure.

- Scheduled bus and taxibus (French: taxi collectif, lit. 'collective taxi') services
  - Local bus routes: Routes operating within the Exo sector's territory. These may be served by full-size city bus, midibus, minibus or taxibus.
  - Express bus routes: Typically commuter lines leading to a metropolitan terminus, REM, metro or train station. May be a city bus or a motor coach.
  - Regional bus routes: More occasional service connecting an Exo sector to areas outside of its territory. Usually a city bus or motor coach.
- Taxibus by reservation: Fixed schedule and stops, but a reservation must be made at least 1 hour in advance. Depending on the sector, reservation may be by phone or web. Taxis are provided by local taxi companies.
- On-demand service, branded as exo on-demand: Fixed stops over a defined territory, but no set route or schedule. Passengers use an app to schedule a pick-up and drop-off between two stops in the territory served.
- Paratransit (French: transport adapté): Door-to-door transportation, by reservation. Service is available to eligible users, according to government of Quebec requirements. An admission request must be submitted. Reservations can be made by phone or online for trips within Exo territory before 4 p.m. the previous day, or 48 hours in advance for trips outside of the service area.

== Bus sectors and routes ==
Exo bus and paratransit services are managed by subsidiary sectors, whose areas are defined by municipalities in ARTM fare zones C and D.

Map of Exo sectors

Exo sectors and municipalities served, by transit fare zone
Exo sector	Zone A and B destinations	Zone C municipalities	Zone D municipalities	Qty of bus routes (Sept. 2024)
Chambly-Richelieu-Carignan	Brossard; Longueuil; Saint-Bruno-de-Montarville	Carignan; Chambly; Marieville; Richelieu; Saint-Mathias-sur-Richelieu	Marieville; Saint-Jean-sur-Richelieu; Paratransit only: Rougemont; Saint-Césaire; Sainte-Angèle-de-Monnoir	17
La Presqu'Île	Montreal	Hudson; L'Île-Perrot; Notre-Dame-de-l'Île-Perrot; Pincourt; Saint-Lazare; Terrasse-Vaudreuil; Vaudreuil-Dorion; Vaudreuil-sur-le-Lac; Paratransit only: Les Cèdres; L'Île-Cadieux; Pointe-des-Cascades	Rigaud; Paratransit only: Pointe-Fortune; Saint-Clet; Sainte-Justine-de-Newton; Sainte-Marthe; Très-Saint-Rédempteur	19
L'Assomption	Montreal	Charlemagne; L'Assomption; Repentigny; Saint-Sulpice	L'Épiphanie; Lavaltrie	13
Laurentides	Laval	Blainville; Boisbriand; Deux-Montagnes; Lorraine; Mirabel; Oka; Pointe-Calumet; Rosemère; Sainte-Anne-des-Plaines; Sainte-Marthe-sur-le-Lac; Sainte-Thérèse; Saint-Eustache; Saint-Jérôme; Saint-Joseph-du-Lac	Saint-Placide	47
Richelain / Roussillon	Brossard; Longueuil; Montreal	Candiac; Delson; La Prairie; Saint-Constant; Saint-Philippe; Sainte-Catherine		38
Sainte-Julie	Longueuil	Sainte-Julie		10
Sorel-Varennes and Marguerite-D'Youville	Longueuil; Montreal	Contrecoeur; Saint-Amable; Sainte-Julie; Varennes; Verchères; Paratransit only (via Marguerite-D'Youville sector): Calixa-Lavallée	Saint-Joseph-de-Sorel; Sorel-Tracy; Paratransit only (via Marguerite-D'Youville sector): Saint-Antoine-sur-Richelieu	13
Sud-Ouest	Montreal	Beauharnois; Châteauguay; Kahnawake; Léry; Mercier	Salaberry-de-Valleyfield; Sainte-Martine	18
Terrebonne-Mascouche	Laval; Montreal	Bois-des-Filion; Mascouche; Terrebonne		28
Vallée du Richelieu	Brossard; Longueuil; Saint-Bruno-de-Montarville	Beloeil; McMasterville; Mont-Saint-Hilaire; Otterburn Park; Saint-Basile-le-Grand; Saint-Mathieu-de-Beloeil	Sainte-Marie-Madeleine; Sainte-Madeleine; Saint-Hyacinthe; Paratransit only: Saint-Charles-sur-Richelieu; Saint-Jean-Baptiste; Saint-Marc-sur-Richelieu	10

== See also ==
- Autorité régionale de transport métropolitain
- Saint-Jean-sur-Richelieu public transit
