= REM de l'Est =

Cancelled public transport project in Montreal

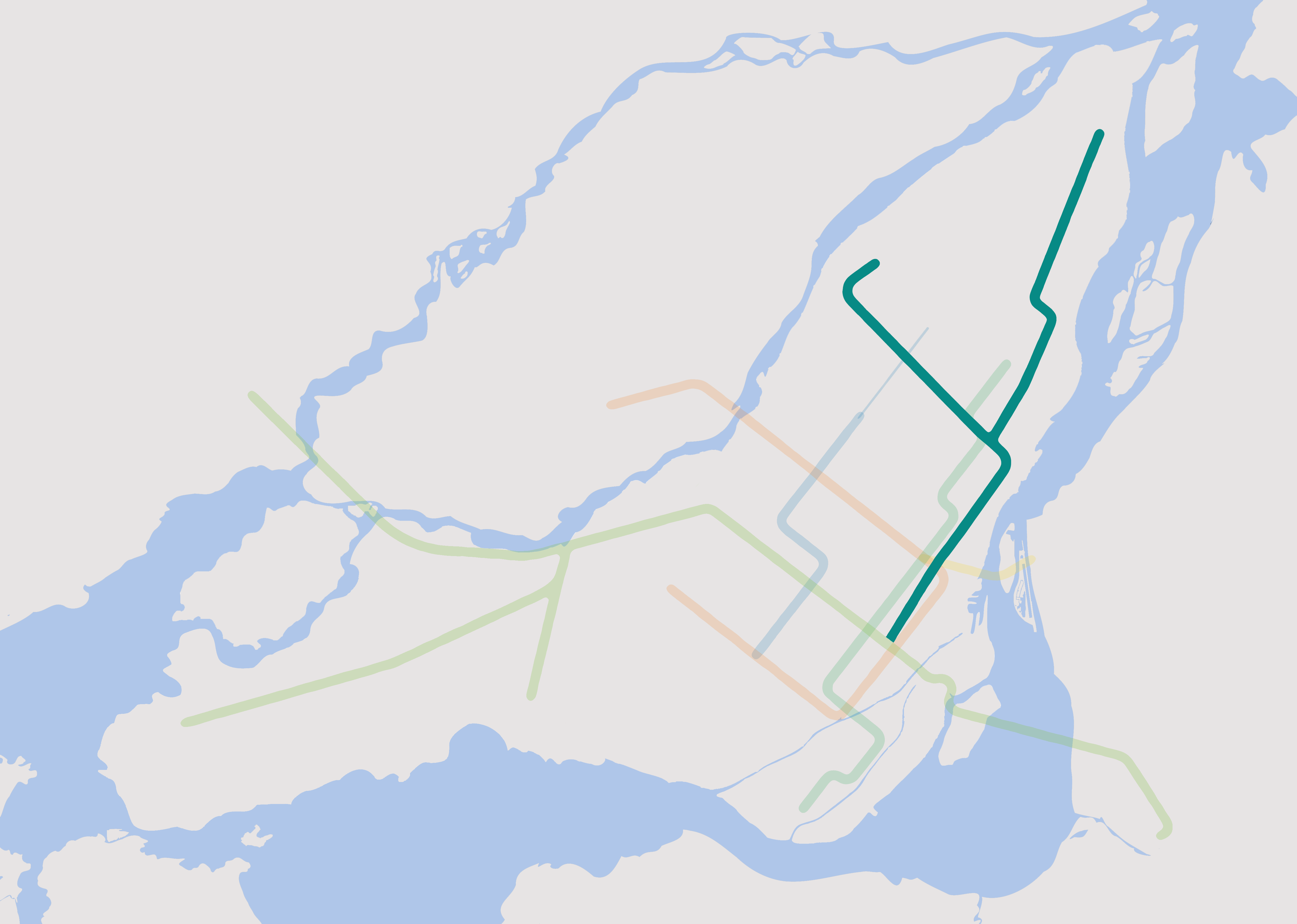
- Proposed route at the time of cancellation

Overview
- Locale: Montreal, Quebec, Canada
- Transit type: Light metro
- Number of stations: 23 (planned)

Technical
- System length: 32 km (20 mi) (planned)

The REM de l'Est (French: [ʁɛm də lɛst]; lit. "Eastern REM") was a project of eastward expansion of the Réseau express métropolitain (REM), the developing light metro network serving the metropolitan area of Montreal, Quebec, Canada. Announced on December 15, 2020, the project was to be built by CDPQ Infra, the institutional investor behind the original REM and the infrastructure subsidiary of Quebec's public pension fund manager, the Caisse de dépôt et placement du Québec (CDPQ).

Spanning 32 km (19.88 mi) and 23 stations, the REM de l'Est would have expanded rapid transit coverage of Montreal's East Island, an area generally considered underserved by public transport. The automated light metro system would have linked downtown Montreal to Pointe-aux-Trembles, on the eastern tip of the island, and to Montréal-Nord, in the northeast. With its estimated cost of $10 billion, it would have been the largest investment in public transport in Quebec history. While polling indicated local favourability to the project, it was prominently criticized for its majority use of elevated rail, especially in a downtown section over René-Lévesque Boulevard, which generated concerns of urban disfigurement, fragmentation and noise pollution. On May 2, 2022, the Quebec and Montreal governments abandoned the idea of a downtown link, leading CDPQ Infra to back out of the project.

The REM de l'Est was immediately replaced by the Projet structurant de l'Est (PSE, lit. 'Eastern Structuring Project'), an expansion project now being helmed by Montreal's regional transport agency, the Autorité régionale de transport métropolitain (ARTM). While it initially kept being referred to as the "REM de l'Est" in media, the PSE has moved away significantly from its predecessor and is now planned as a tramway system.

== History ==
=== Background ===
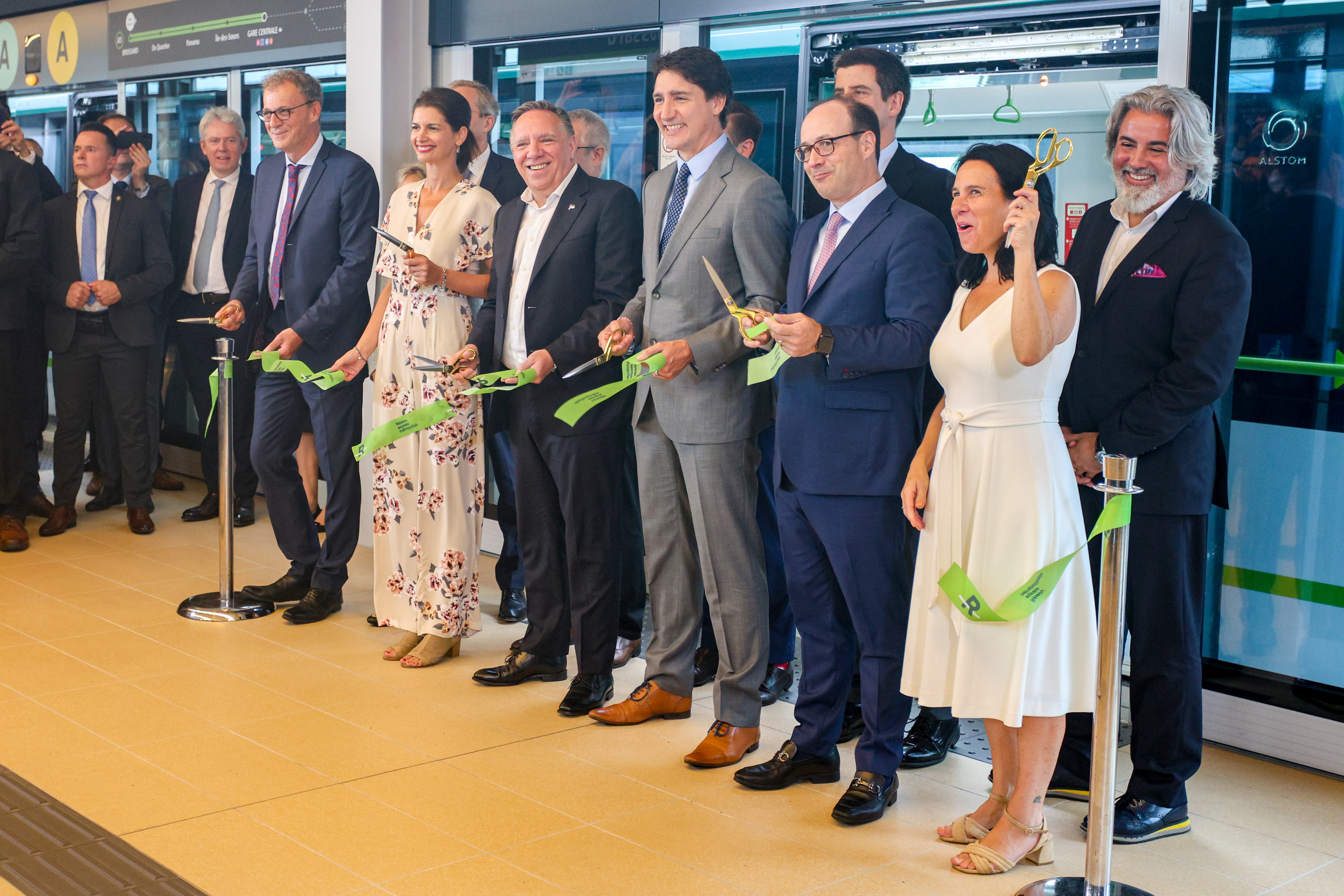
Inauguration of the REM, with Canadian prime minister Justin Trudeau, Quebec premier François Legault, Montreal mayor Valérie Plante, CDPQ CEO Charles Emond, and others

Multiple times in 2018, the recently elected Coalition Avenir Québec (CAQ) provincial party, led by premier François Legault, promoted the possibility of expanding Montreal's Réseau express métropolitain (REM) light metro network, a key public transport project of the previous Liberal administration that had broken ground that same year. The REM was born out of a 2015 partnership between the Quebec government and its public pension fund manager, the Caisse de dépôt et placement du Québec (CDPQ), wherein the latter would invest in and manage large infrastructure projects in the province for the first time. The 67 km (41.63 mi) project was seen as cost-effective, especially for North American standards.

On May 6, 2019, the Quebec government formally instructed the CDPQ to study different scenarios for expanding the REM towards the suburban cities of Laval and Chambly, as well as implementing a structuring public transport network in eastern Montreal. These scenarios fulfilled some of the same objectives as other already proposed transit projects, such as the Montreal Metro's Pink Line and the east end tramway on Notre-Dame Street. The Autorité régionale de transport métropolitain (ARTM), the governmental agency in charge of overseeing public transport in Greater Montreal, was not invited to participate in the process, something Montreal mayor Valérie Plante criticized and demanded be reversed.

=== Announcement ===
On December 15, 2020, CDPQ Infra, the infrastructure subsidiary of the CDPQ, announced the "REM de l'Est" alongside the governments of Quebec and Montreal. The firm had then yet to inaugurate the original REM system's first line.

The REM de l'Est was announced as a 32 km (19.88 mi) extension of the REM, with 23 stations connecting the underserved east of Montreal Island to downtown Montreal. Like the REM, the REM de l'Est would have been an electric, fully automated (GoA4) light metro system. From the downtown station in Ville-Marie borough, trains would have gone towards Cégep Marie-Victorin in Montréal-Nord, in the northeast, and Pointe-aux-Trembles, on the eastern tip of the island. The former trip was estimated to take 30 minutes and the latter 25 minutes, with headways of 2 to 4 minutes at peak hours.

24 km (14.91 mi) of rails would have been elevated, while the remaining 8 km (4.97 mi), comprising most of the northern branch towards Cégep Marie-Victorin, as well as a 500-meter downtown section between Robert-Bourassa terminal station and Bleury Street, would have been underground. The latter section, like the tip of the northern branch in Montréal-Nord, was switched to a tunnel in 2021. Construction for the REM de l'Est was set to begin in mid-2023, with inauguration scheduled for mid-2029.

=== Reception ===
==== Service of eastern Montreal ====
Upon announcement of the REM de l'Est, many celebrated the planned introduction of rapid transit to the East Island's public transport offer, which consists mostly of bus lines. Supporters welcomed the prospect of new economic development in the sector, a formerly largely industrial area. Potential socioeconomic benefits in areas such as Montréal-Nord, one of the poorest in the city, were also highlighted by some, including that borough's mayor.

==== Elevated tracks ====
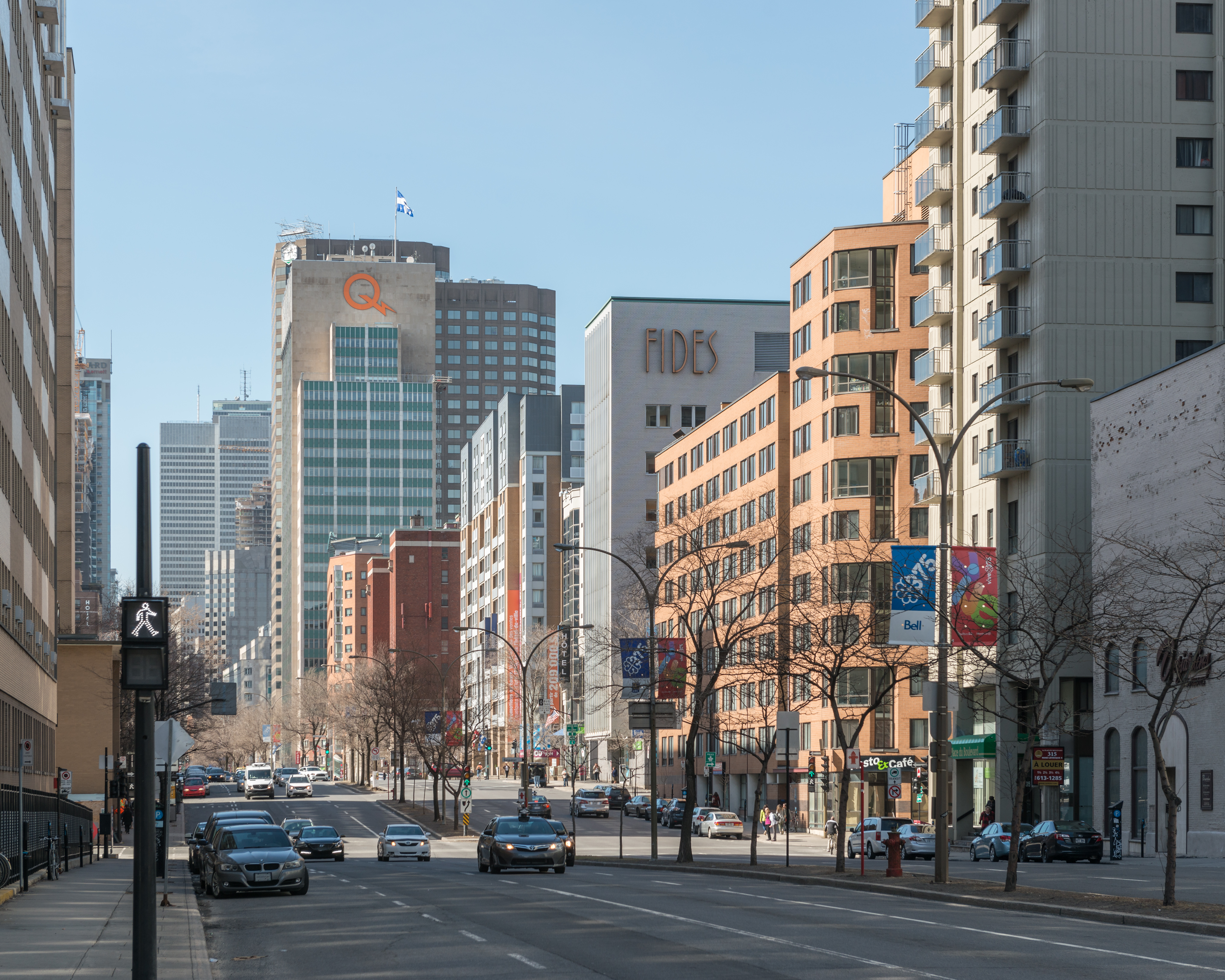
A stretch of René-Lévesque Boulevard where elevated tracks were planned

The elevated portion of the REM de l'Est received significant criticism and media attention, taking up much of the public discourse surrounding the system. The aerial tracks generated concerns of urban disfigurement, especially in downtown Montreal on a section of René-Lévesque Boulevard. Tracks would have bordered Montreal's Chinatown to the north, with a station planned on a vacant lot next to one of the area's four paifangs, leading some critics to worry the structures would visually block an entrance to the neighbourhood.

CDPQ Infra stated that it had studied six different underground options for the downtown branch of the network and that all of them had been ruled out due to safety and financial risks. These complications were attributed to the proximity of Metro lines and century-old sewer lines as well as to the frailty of the soil. The Caisse's CEO, Charles Emond, stated that tunneling would make the construction of the system three times as expensive and twice as long. Montreal mayor Valérie Plante, as well as some experts, asked for detailed information before ruling out the underground option.

The integration of elevated structures also proved challenging in other sectors. In a report, Montreal's public consultation office, the OCPM, warned the REM de l'Est would "scar" the Faubourgs sector in the Centre-Sud, an industrial and heavily trafficked area which the city hoped to revitalize. Further east, in the borough of Mercier-Hochelaga-Maisonneuve, trains would have run across the southern edge of Morgan Park in the Ancienne-Cité-de-Maisonneuve sector, now a provincial heritage site.

In a report, an expert advisory committee expressed concern that the structure would "fracture" Montreal's urban landscape and bisect neighbourhoods. Addressing such concerns, CDPQ Infra unveiled a redesign on March 9, 2022, featuring a leaner platform, more elaborate pillars and a 16-kilometer pedestrian promenade along René-Lévesque Boulevard, Notre-Dame Street and Sherbrooke Street. The plan would have removed four of the eight car lanes on René-Lévesque, adapting the space for pedestrians and cyclists. However, the city of Montreal, rather than CDPQ Infra, would have been expected to cover the related costs.

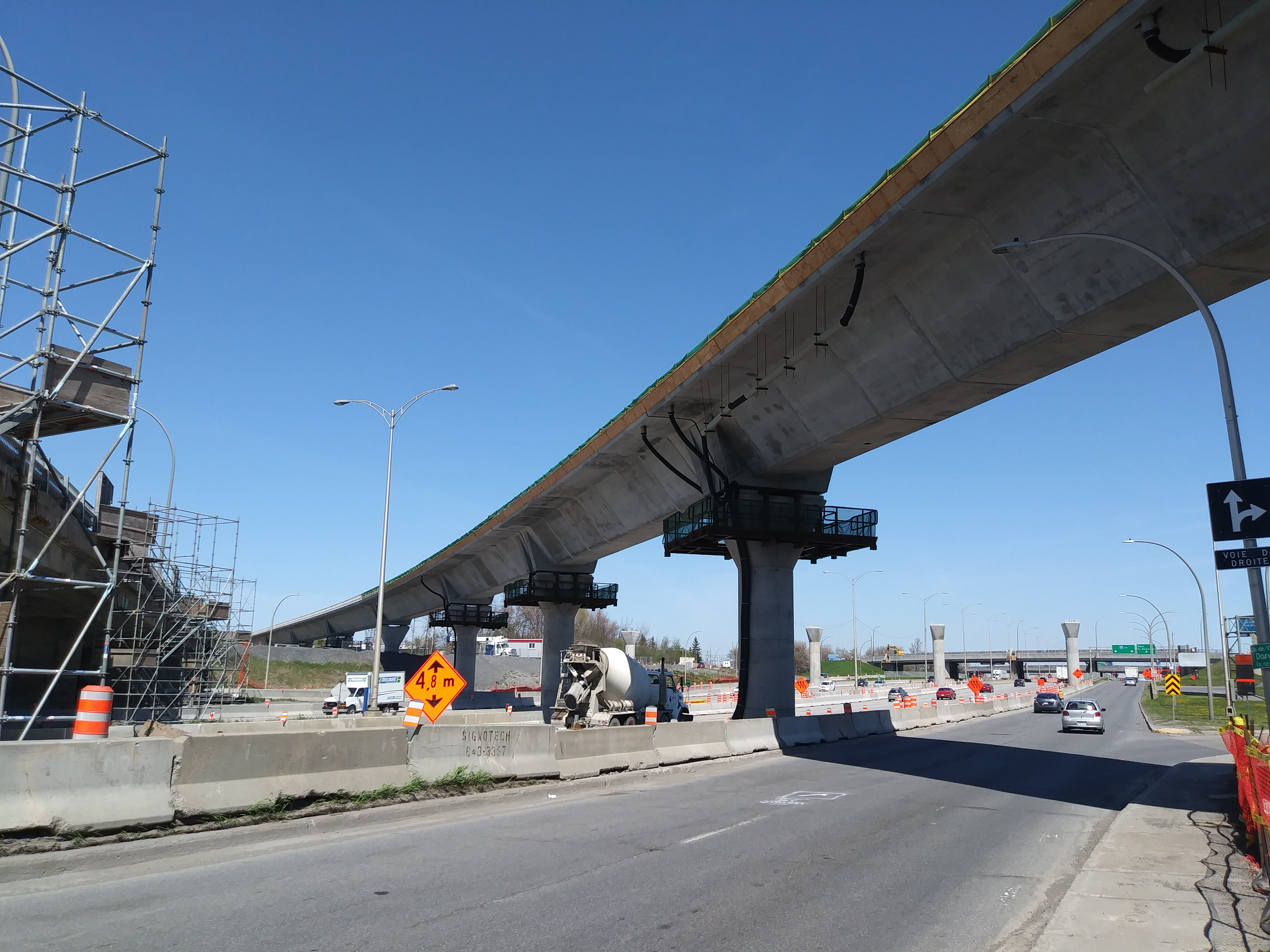
Elevated structure for the original REM

The elevated sections of the system also raised concerns of noise pollution and disruptive vibrations from the passage of trains, especially in residential areas. In the year after the REM de l'Est was announced, the Collectif en environnement Mercier-Est (CEM-E, lit. "Mercier-Est environment collective"), a local advocacy group with 20 or so members, emerged as a prominent critic of the project, especially of its predicted negative impacts on local residents. The CEM-E distributed thousands of flyers and organized assemblies and protests, some of which were covered by news media and attended by local politicians. An emblem spread by the CEM-E, a red circle-backslash symbol over a duo of evil-eyed elevated trains looking threateningly at cars underneath, became a de facto symbol of opposition to the REM de l'Est. Op-eds by members of the CEM-E were published in most of Montreal's daily newspapers.

On January 25, 2022, CDPQ Infra announced plans to reroute a 4-kilometer stretch of elevated rail that was a main target of criticism from local residents, including the CEM-E. Under a deal with the Canadian National Railway Company (CN), the REM would have run along already existing tracks used by CN freight trains instead of the originally planned stretch of Sherbrooke Street. The CEM-E and other local residents maintained their opposition to the elevated structure.

Supporters of an elevated REM de l'Est highlighted the potential improvement of eastern René-Lévesque Boulevard, perceived as car-heavy and unattractive, and the perspective of unique views of the city and the St. Lawrence River from aboard the train. Some cited examples of various cities with elevated railway where those systems are considered successfully integrated. The fierce opposition from local residents has been argued as a case of NIMBY culture.

==== Environmental impact ====
Supporters of the REM de l'Est expected the system to reduce urban sprawl and car dependency in Greater Montreal and, thus, lower the city's greenhouse gas emissions (GHGs) and help mitigate climate change. CDPQ Infra claimed the project would save 35,000 tons of GHGs per year.

Many praised the planned removal of four (out of eight) car lanes on René-Lévesque Boulevard, a major axis of east-west traffic in downtown Montreal, alongside the elevated system. The plan, which would have reallocated space to pedestrians and cyclists, raised some concerns related to traffic congestion.

==== Tension with the city and ARTM ====
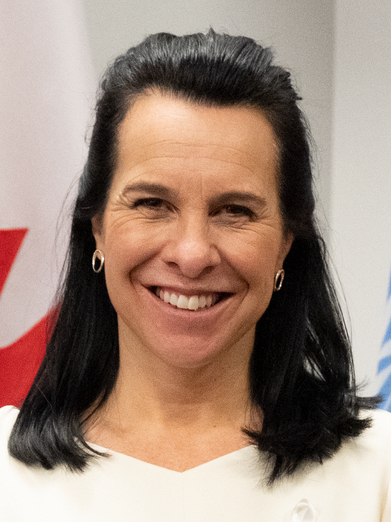
Valérie Plante, mayor of Montreal from 2017 to 2025

Criticism towards the REM de l'Est also targeted envisioned competition between CDPQ Infra's network and other public transport networks in Montreal, such as the Montreal Metro, the Exo commuter rail network and the Pie-IX bus rapid transit (BRT) corridor. All of these networks are under the jurisdiction of the Autorité régionale de transport métropolitain (ARTM).

Montreal mayor Valérie Plante and leaders from all three opposition parties in Quebec's National Assembly demanded that the ARTM and/or the city be more involved in negotiations surrounding the project. Many echoed their demand, sometimes arguing the Caisse's financial incentives hindered the pursuit of an optimal transit network for the city. In an internal analysis, the Société de transport de Montréal (STM), the agency which runs Montreal's Metro and city buses, concluded: "The Caisse's primary mandate is to grow its assets. Transport agencies' objective is to develop complementary networks that benefit clients. Both mandates are legitimate but often incompatible." The STM also claimed to have been informed of the REM de l'Est just a day before its announcement. Similarly, Valérie Plante claimed to have learned of the 4-kilometer rerouting along the Canadian National tracks just a day in advance.

On February 8, 2022, the ARTM released an 84-page report critical of the REM de l'Est, allegedly without solicitation from the Quebec government. In the report, the ARTM argued the system only met a fraction of the transit needs of East Islanders, based on a 2013 estimation that only 12% of targeted riders commuted daily to downtown Montreal. Based on that same study, the agency also predicted the network would convert only a small number of car users to public transit. Furthermore, the ARTM shared other critics' worry that a branch of the REM de l'Est would "cannibalize" the ridership of the Metro's Green Line, to which it would have run parallel.

The ARTM's report was seen as a major sign of jeopardy for the REM de l'Est. CDPQ Infra, in its response, stated it would abandon the project without the agency's backing but also criticized its report. Notably, it argued that the ARTM's worry of ridership cannibalization was inconsistent with the agency's past claim that the Metro's Green Line was nearing saturation. CDPQ Infra also claimed that the report underestimated potential cars-to-public-transport modal shift by 300%. Others, including provincial transport minister Chantal Rouleau, argued the 2013 numbers used in the study were out of date.

The dispute between the Caisse and the ARTM was decried by some, including Eastern Montreal's Chamber of Commerce (CCEM), which labeled it "internal fighting" and stated that it was taking place "at the expense of Eastern Montreal".

==== Polling ====
"Social acceptability" of the REM de l'Est was a stated key concern of the Quebec and Montreal governments, and its lack thereof was eventually cited by them as the main reason behind the project's cancellation. Nonetheless, a Léger poll conducted a week before the cancellation but published afterward found that 67% of residents of eastern Montreal were favorable to the project, while 24% were unfavorable.

=== Cancellation ===
On May 2, 2022, Quebec premier François Legault, along with Montreal mayor Valérie Plante, announced its government had decided to eliminate from the REM de l'Est's proposed network the downtown section running west of Dickson Street. According to Legault, the elevated stretch, which would have run over eastern René-Lévesque Boulevard and Notre-Dame Street, alongside Chinatown and across the Faubourgs sector and Morgan Park, lacked social acceptability. CDPQ Infra backed out of the revised project, which it considered unprofitable. The firm sold its research to the Quebec government for close to $100 million but kept its trademark for the name "REM de l'Est", leading the project to eventually be renamed "Projet structurant de l'Est" (lit. "Eastern Structuring Project"), or PSE.

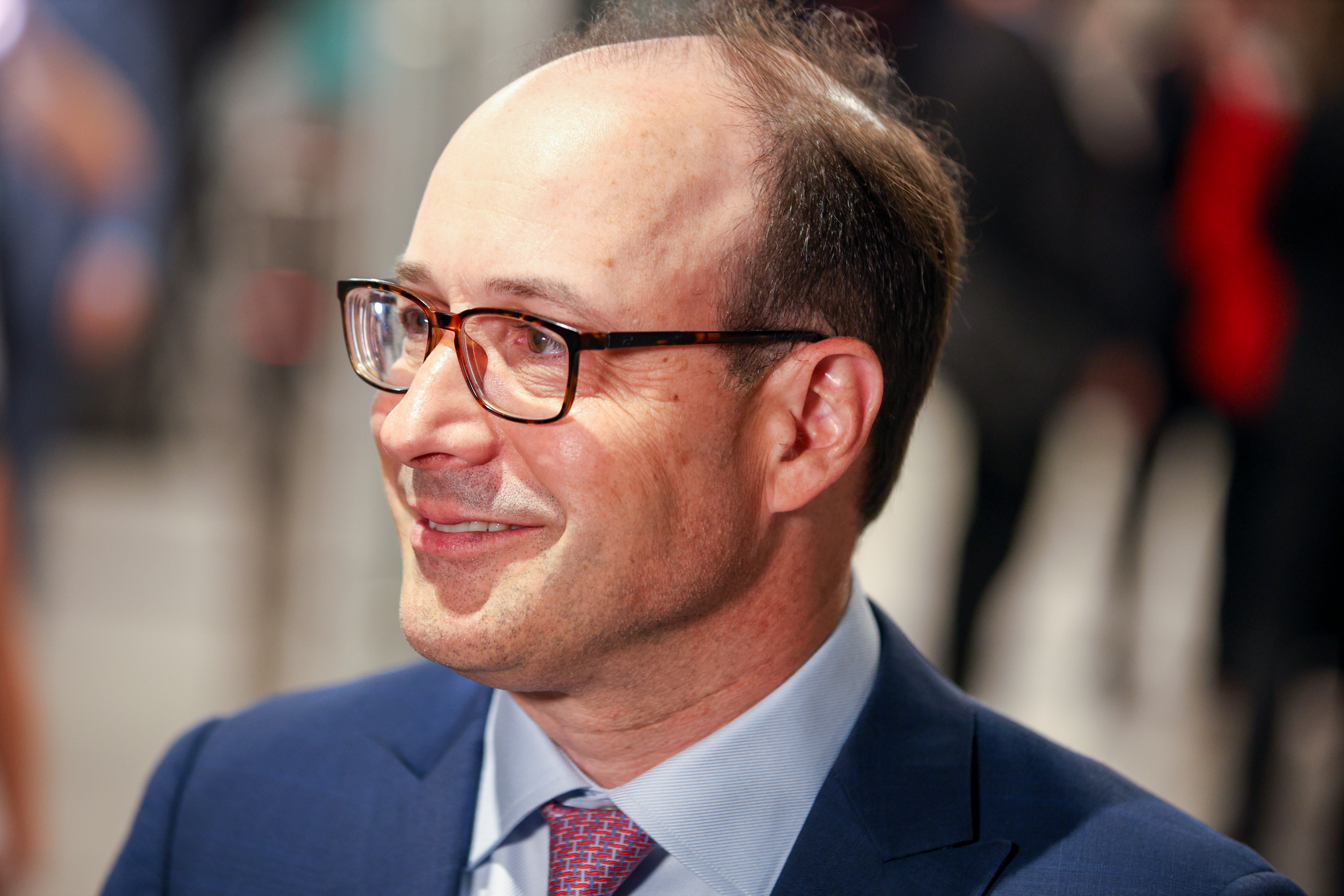
CDPQ CEO Charles Emond

In his first public remarks after the announcement, the Caisse's CEO, Charles Emond, claimed the firm had offered Valérie Plante a seat at the negotiations table weeks prior and that she had been pleased. However, according to Emond, she quickly seemed to have changed her mind: "Ten days later, she calls the government to say she wants a new project. The government told me it didn't think the Caisse would be a part of it. … [They] told me: 'That's the end of the REM de l'Est.'" Emond was criticized by the provincial opposition parties for blaming Plante. Some sources also claimed Legault's decision was motivated by a desire to avoid conflict with Valérie Plante before the upcoming 2022 Quebec general election, where his party hoped to make gains on Montreal Island.

=== Aftermath ===
The Autorité régionale de transport métropolitain (ARTM), an impactful critic of the REM de l'Est which many had requested be more involved in the project, was put in charge of the Projet structurant de l'Est, alongside the provincial Ministry of Transportation, the city of Montreal and the Société de transport de Montréal (STM). First details on the PSE included that it would be connected to the Metro's Green Line via Assomption station, rather than be directly linked to downtown Montreal, and that a subsequent second phase of the project would extend towards the city of Laval and the region of Lanaudière.

It was initially unclear how similar the network would be to the REM de l'Est. The ARTM stated it would study multiple scenarios that had been discarded by CDPQ Infra, including abandoning automation, thus allowing trains to run at ground level and avoiding elevated structures, or burying a larger portion of the network. Concurrently, both François Legault and Valérie Plante stated that only a fraction of the project needed to be altered. Provincial transport minister Chantal Rouleau also claimed 85% of the route would be maintained, while the Caisse's CEO, Charles Emond, speculated only 10% of the work remained before new calls for tenders could be initiated.

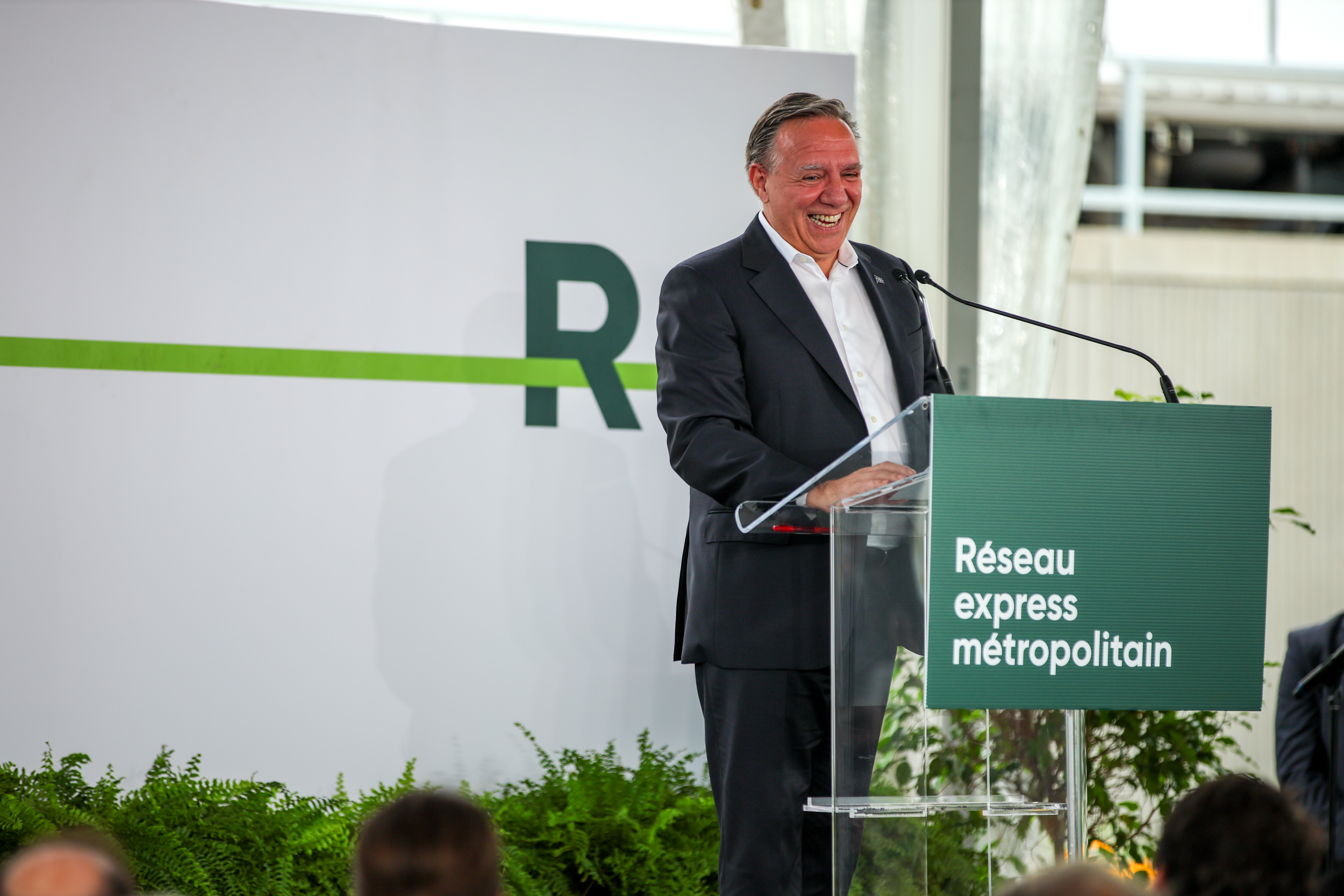
François Legault, premier of Quebec from 2018 to 2026

However, on July 1, 2023, the ARTM's proposed project was revealed to be a $36 billion fully-underground light metro system, without a direct downtown link but with an extension of the REM de l'Est route towards the neighbourhood of Rivière-des-Prairies and the cities of Laval and Charlemagne. Days later, François Legault rejected the project, citing its cost, more than three times that of the REM de l'Est. He further claimed the ARTM had never been instructed to develop an entirely underground system. The ARTM was widely criticized for its proposal. Quebec's Minister of Finance, Eric Girard, said the $36 billion price tag "discredits the project from the start". Christian Savard, director of the urbanist nonprofit Vivre en Ville, said the proposal seemed "more like a political battle against elevated structures than a reasoned approach by public transport experts".

On August 17, 2023, a tramway system was revealed to be in consideration for the PSE. This was criticized by Valérie Plante, who pointed out the mode's lower speed and said that the "project as presented should not be reconsidered". On January 12, 2024, the current iteration of the PSE was confirmed to be a tramway. The system was initially announced as comprising 28 stations, spanning 31 km (19.26 mi) and costing $13 billion. However, the ARTM's final proposal, released on May 31, 2024, comprises 31 stations, spans 38 km (23.61 mi) and would cost an estimated $18.6 billion. Its route is similar to that of the REM de l'Est, although it doesn't include a direct link to downtown Montreal and instead adds stations in Rivière-des-Prairies, Montréal-Est and the off-island suburbs of Terrebonne and Repentigny. A new tunnel would allow the tracks to cross the Des Prairies River. Tramways would run at 30 km/h (18.64 mph) for most of the route. The PSE is projected to open in 2035 or 2036. While Valérie Plante and provincial transport minister Geneviève Guilbault stated support for the project, it was criticized by some city planning advocates for its chosen mode of transport and its lack of a direct downtown link.

Despite its official name, the PSE initially generally kept being referred to as the "REM de l'Est" in news media. Since the announcement of the PSE's pivot towards tramway, however, the distinction between the two appellations has become more established.

== Planned stations ==
The REM de l'Est network would have comprised 23 stations (excluding a 24th "potential" station, Viauville), spanning 6 boroughs of Montreal. Two branches, the north-south Marie-Victorin branch and the east-west Pointe-aux-Trembles branch, would have merged downtown to create a common segment. 15 stations would have been elevated, while the remaining 8 would have been underground. All would have been universally accessible and featured platform screen doors.

The network would have been connected to the original Réseau express métropolitain, to all four lines of the Montreal Metro, to two Exo commuter rail lines and to the Pie-IX bus rapid transit.

	Aboveground station
	Underground station
*	Potential station
†	Branch terminal

Branch	Borough	Station	Connections
Common segment	Ville-Marie	Robert-Bourassa †	at Gare Centrale at Bonaventure; Mont-Saint-Hilaire line at Gare Centrale
Common segment	Ville-Marie	Saint-Laurent	
Common segment	Ville-Marie	Labelle	at Berri-UQAM
Common segment	Ville-Marie	Cartier	
Common segment	Ville-Marie	Dufresne	
Common segment	Mercier–Hochelaga-Maisonneuve	Davidson	
Common segment	Mercier–Hochelaga-Maisonneuve	Pie-IX Sud	Pie-IX BRT
Common segment	Mercier–Hochelaga-Maisonneuve	Saint-Clément	
Common segment	Mercier–Hochelaga-Maisonneuve	Viauville*	
Marie-Victorin	Mercier–Hochelaga-Maisonneuve	Assomption	at Assomption
Marie-Victorin	Rosemont–La Petite-Patrie	Hôpital Maisonneuve-Rosemont	
Marie-Victorin	Rosemont–La Petite-Patrie	Saint-Zotique	
Marie-Victorin	Saint-Léonard	Lacordaire	at Lacordaire (future station)
Marie-Victorin	Saint-Léonard	Saint-Léonard	Mascouche line at Saint-Léonard–Montréal-Nord
Marie-Victorin	Saint-Léonard	Couture	
Marie-Victorin	Montréal-Nord	Montréal-Nord	
Marie-Victorin	Montréal-Nord	Cégep Marie-Victorin †	
Pointe-aux-Trembles	Mercier–Hochelaga-Maisonneuve	Haig	
Pointe-aux-Trembles	Mercier–Hochelaga-Maisonneuve	Souligny	
Pointe-aux-Trembles	Mercier–Hochelaga-Maisonneuve	Pierre-Bernard	
Pointe-aux-Trembles	Rivière-des-Prairies–Pointe-aux-Trembles	Saint-Jean-Baptiste	
Pointe-aux-Trembles	Rivière-des-Prairies–Pointe-aux-Trembles	Tricentenaire	
Pointe-aux-Trembles	Rivière-des-Prairies–Pointe-aux-Trembles	Rousselière	
Pointe-aux-Trembles	Rivière-des-Prairies–Pointe-aux-Trembles	Pointe-aux-Trembles †	Mascouche line at Pointe-aux-Trembles

== Rolling stock ==
No choice of rolling stock had been announced by the time the REM de l'Est project was abandoned on May 2, 2023, as the deadline for bids was still months away. In the notice to the market released by CDPQ Infra, the description of the desired rolling stock was nearly identical to the one that had been made for the original REM, which employs Alstom Metropolis trains. (Note: In 2018, the manufacturing of these trains in India had drawn backlash in Quebec due to the lack of local content requirements. The Coalition Avenir Québec provincial party, which was since elected into power, was among those who wished for at least parts of the contract to be awarded to Bombardier Transportation's factory in La Pocatière, Quebec, instead of Alstom. In 2020, however, Alstom acquired the Quebec-founded manufacturer and its factories — a deal which incidentally saw the Caisse de dépôt et placement du Québec becoming Alstom's largest shareholder. Following the acquisition, Alstom had indicated support for local content requirements in public transport contracts in Quebec. The Fédération de l'industrie manufacturière (lit. "Federation of the manufacturing industry"), a collective of Quebec unions, stated it wished for the REM de l'Est rolling stock to be manufactured by Alstom in the newly acquired La Pocatière factory.)

== See also ==
- Urban rail transit in Canada
