= Lacordaire Boulevard =

North–south thoroughfare in Montreal, Quebec, Canada

- Native name: Boulevard Lacordaire (French)
- Length: 8.9 km (5.5 mi)
- Location: Between Louis-Veillot Street near Souligny Avenue to Gouin Boulevard
- Major junctions: A-40 (TCH); R-138

Construction
- Inauguration: May 29, 1911

Lacordaire Boulevard (French: Boulevard Lacordaire) is a north-south thoroughfare in Montreal.

== Location and access ==
This large north-south artery of the eastern part of the Island of Montreal is designated as a boulevard north of Saint-Zotique Street in the Saint-Léonard and Montréal-Nord boroughs, while between Saint-Zotique Street and Rosemont Boulevard, it is known as "Rue Lacordaire" (Lacordaire Street) in the borough of Mercier–Hochelaga-Maisonneuve. South of Rosemont Boulevard, its extension is Dickson Street. However, another more residential section of the boulevard resumes starting at Pierre-Bédard Street up until its end south of the junction at Souligny Street, and it goes by the name "Rue Lacordaire".

Exit 77 of Quebec Autoroute 40 leads to Lacordaire Boulevard. Bus route 32 of the Société de transport de Montréal provides local service, while bus route 432 provides an express service beginning in Montreal-North and connecting with Cadillac Métro station; route 353 provides night service.

The Exo commuter train station Gare Saint-Léonard–Montréal-Nord is located on the boulevard.

The Blue Line extension eastward will feature a new unnamed station at the intersection of Jean-Talon street and Lacordaire boulevard. It is set to open in 2029.

== Name ==
The boulevard gets its name from Jean-Baptiste Henri Lacordaire (1802-1861), a French preacher who was known for re-establishing the Dominican Order in France following the French Revolution.

== History ==
The boulevard opened in 1911, but it was expanded only in the 1960s north of Saint-Zotique Street to keep up with the demographic growth of the island. Rue Lacordaire was first designated in 1911, and Boulevard Lacordaire got its designation in 1963.

== Notable buildings and other places of interest ==
- Leonardo Da Vinci Centre (French: Centre Leonardo Da Vinci), a community centre located in Saint-Léonard. Established in 2002, the centre offers various types of services in English, French and Italian. In the summer, it runs a summer camp called Camp Allegria. It is also home to the Mirella & Lino Saputo Theatre, a 533-seat auditorium that hosts different plays and concerts throughout the year, as well as a fitness room.
- Wilfrid-Bastien Park (French: Parc Wilfrid-Bastien), a public park in Saint-Léonard with a playground, a small lake with a bridge, a skate park, and a mini-park among other available equipment.
- Saint-Leonard Library (French: Bibliothèque de Saint-Léonard), a public library in Saint-Léonard, offering books and other media for children and adults.

== Gallery ==
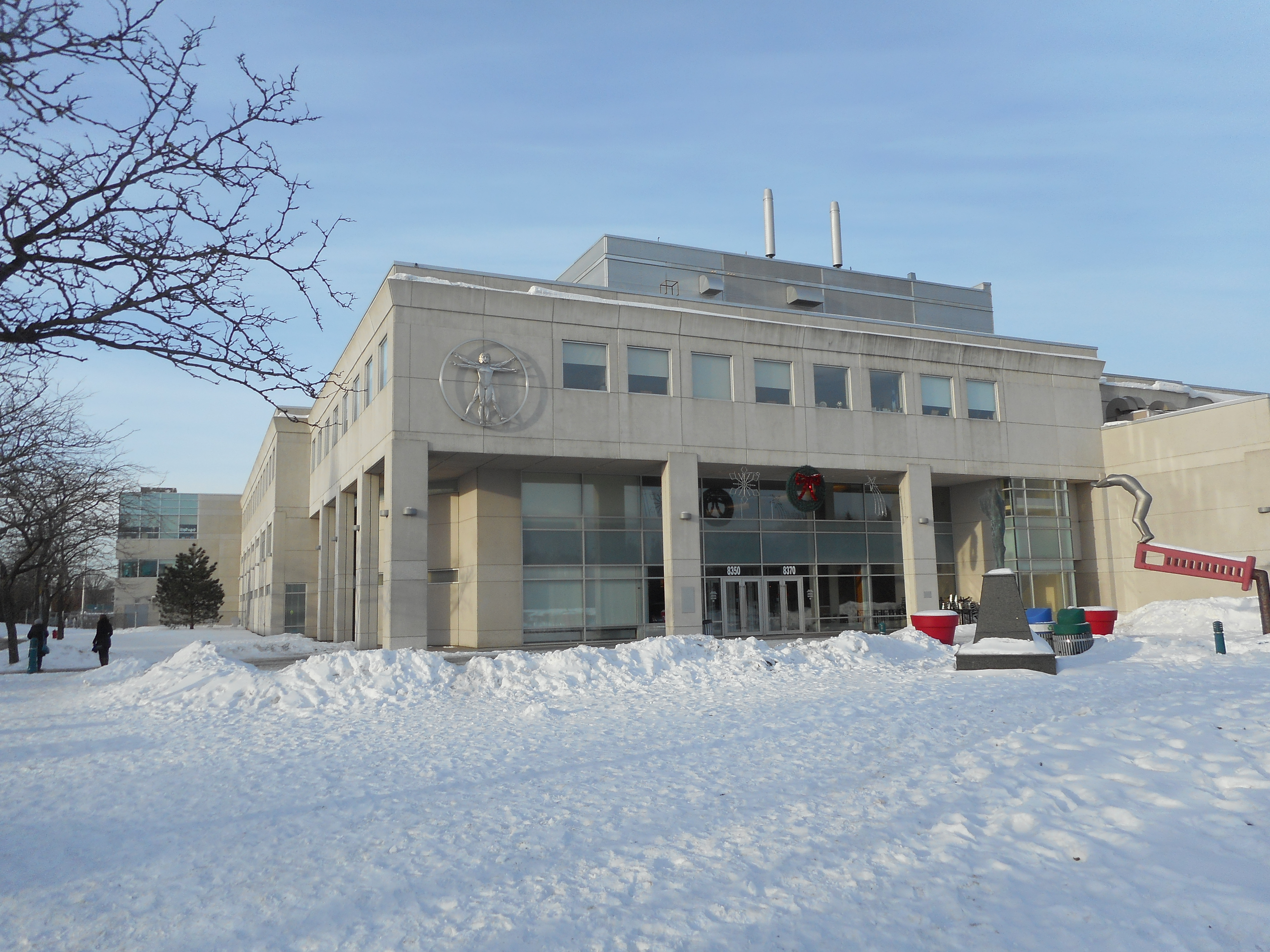
Leonardo da Vinci Centre, community centre located on Lacordaire Boulevard that serves the east end of Montreal and Saint-Léonard

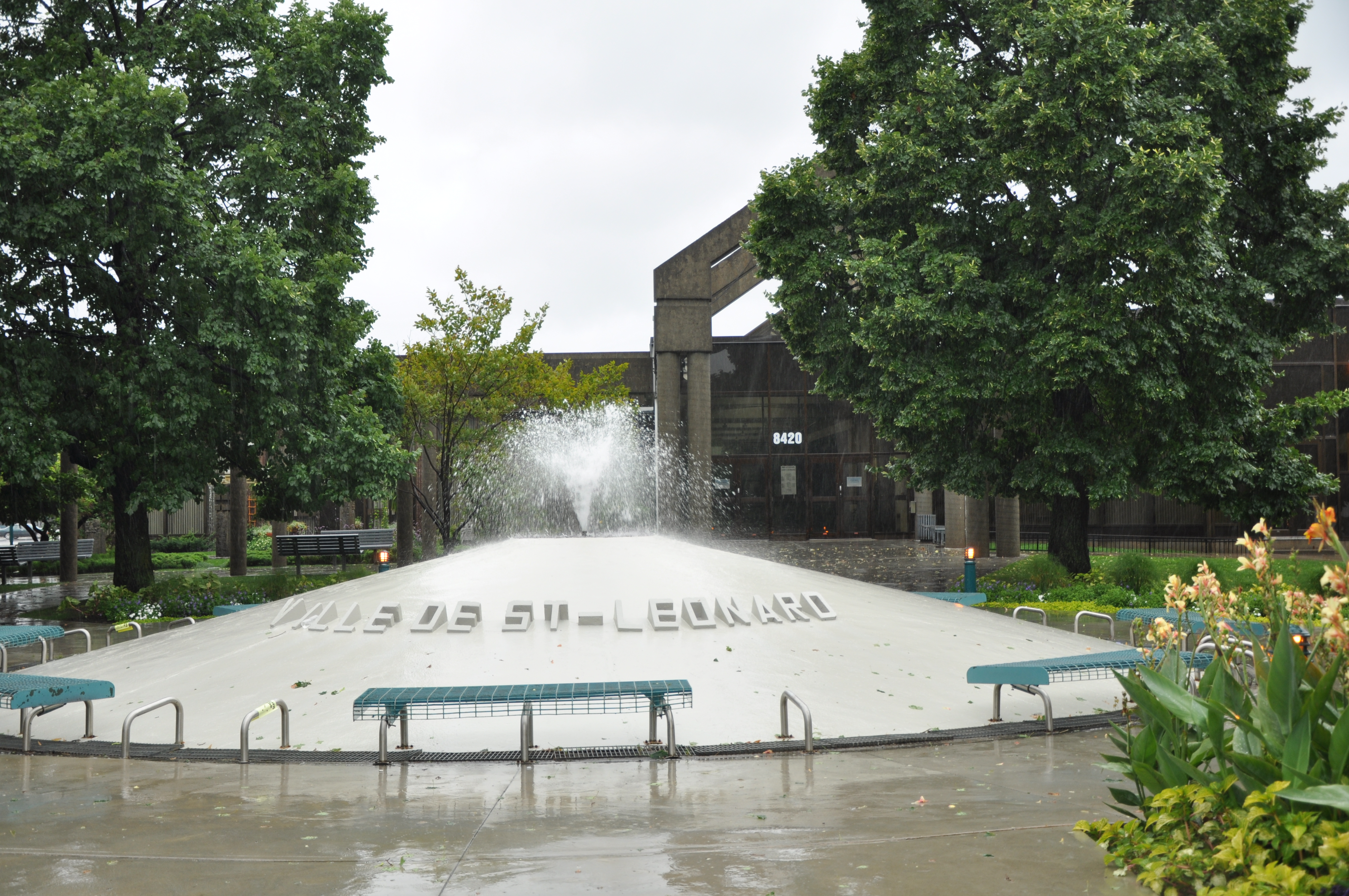
The Saint-Léonard Library (background) with the Ville de Saint-Léonard fountain in the foreground.
