= Mercier, Montreal =

Mercier
- Neighbourhood
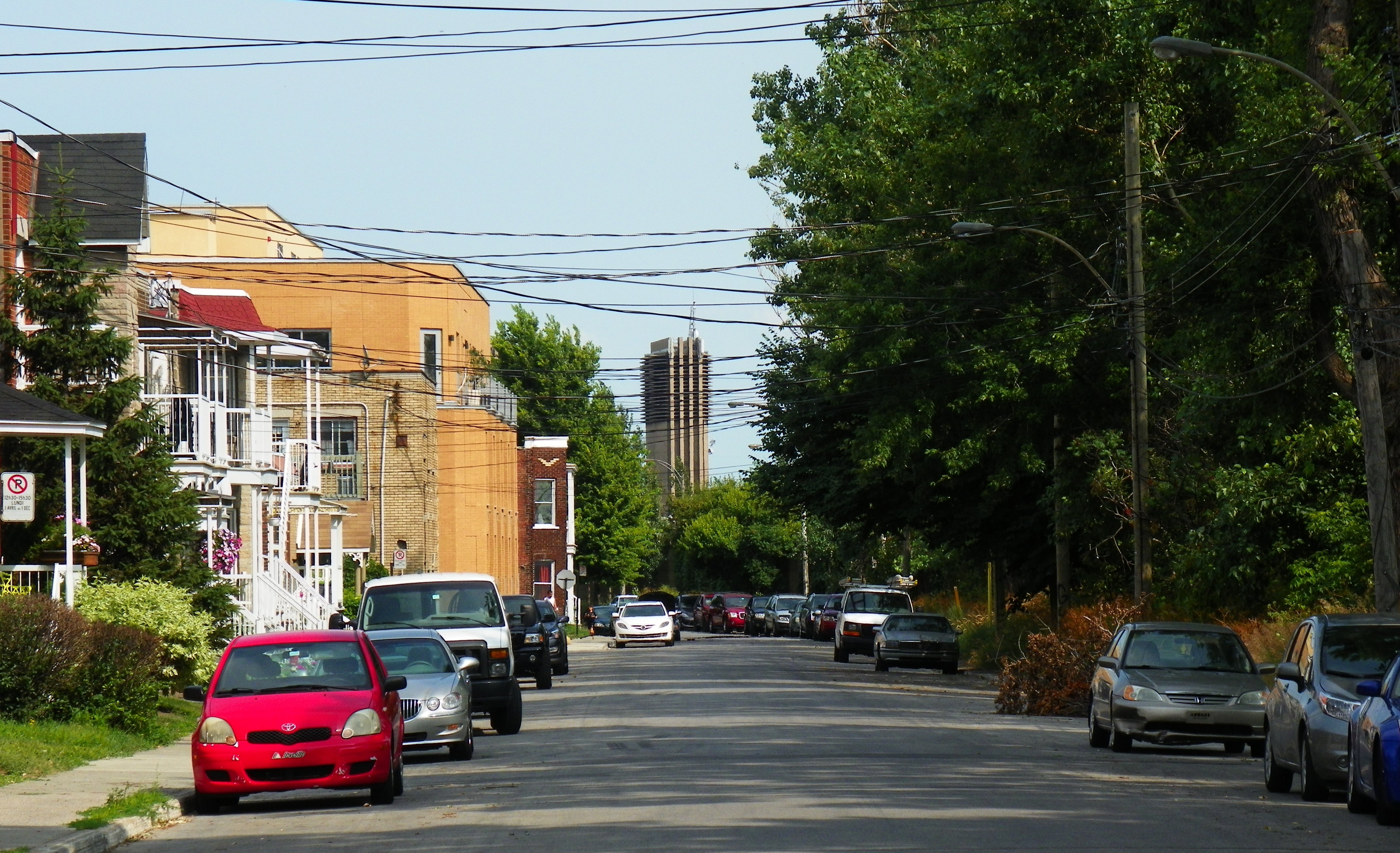
- Rue Curatteau. In background, a ventilation tower for Louis-Hippolyte-La Fontaine tunnel

- Location of Mercier in Montreal
- Coordinates: 45.5958°N 73.5163°W
- Country: Canada
- Province: Quebec
- City: Montreal
- Borough: Mercier–Hochelaga-Maisonneuve
- Postal code(s): H1L, H1M, H1N
- Area codes: (514) and (438)

Mercier (French pronunciation: [mɛʁsje]) denotes the eastern portion of the Mercier–Hochelaga-Maisonneuve borough of the city of Montreal, Quebec. It consists of two neighbourhoods Mercier-Ouest (Longue-Pointe) and Mercier-Est (Tétreaultville).

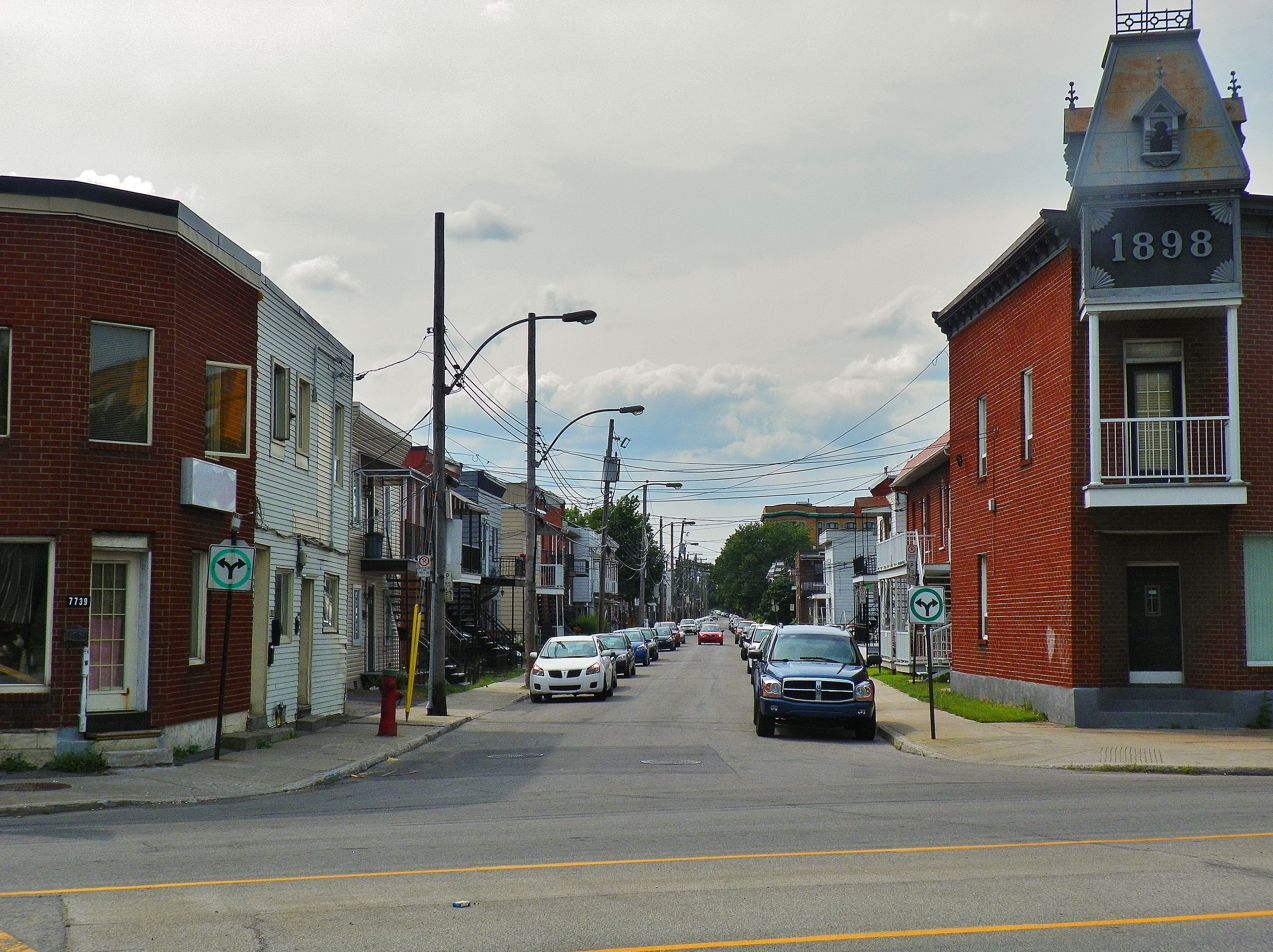
Rue Lepailleur in Mercier-Est.

== History ==
Mercier was named after Honoré Mercier (1840–1894), Premier of Quebec from 1887 to 1891.

Urbanization began in 1890, and the western portion, Longue-Pointe, become an industrial area by the early 20th century. This social transformation was induced by the arrival of large industries in Longue-Pointe and the building of a tramway on Notre-Dame Street.

Originally an agglomeration of old villages, Longue-Pointe and Tétreaultville, they were annexed to Montreal in 1910.

The neighbourhood's social and economic character was vastly transformed during the urban planning of the 1960s in Montreal in anticipation of Expo 67.

In 1960, the construction of the Autoroute 25 saw the demolition of many residential buildings in Mercier and divided it into two districts, Mercier-Ouest and Mercier-Est.

The extension of the metro and elimination of the tramway exacerbated industrial activity, and the remnants of the rural landscape of Longue-Pointe disappeared. Citizens battled against the urbanization plans of the 1960s in hopes of preserving their village community. The only success they had is limiting the Port of Montreal's expansion along the St. Lawrence River in Mercier-Est. They preserved the promenade Bellerive south of Notre-Dame Street in Mercier-Est.

Unlike neighbouring Hochelaga-Maisonneuve, it suffered a lesser degree of economic decline and poverty related to the movement of capital and production to Toronto.

Since 1987, Mercier-Est has become well known for social mobilization against government projects intended to intensify industrialization. Social organization still exist today. Solidarité Mercier-Est is an example of citizen's groups fighting against gentrification, further urbanization and industrialization. Their activism is focused toward the RUI Integrated Urban Renewal and Contrecoeur projects currently underway in the district.

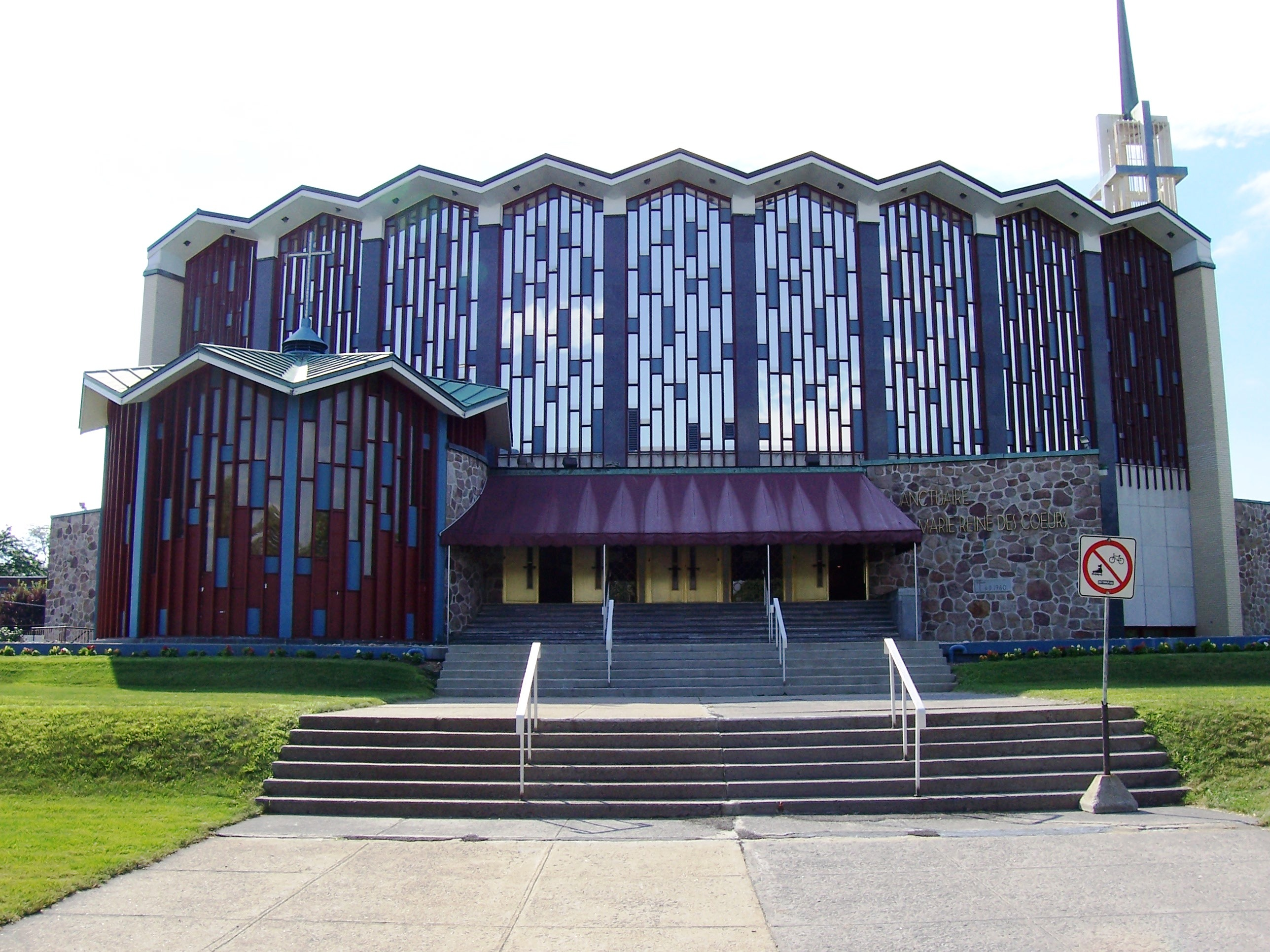
Sanctuaire Marie-Reine-des-Coeurs, on Rue Sherbooke

== Features ==
Mercier is home to Promenade Bellerive Park, one of the east end's largest green spaces. Other notable features include the Place Versailles shopping mall, the Institut universitaire en santé mentale de Montréal, the Sanctuaire Marie-Reine-des-Coeurs and the historic Chateau Dufresne.

The Canadian Armed Forces also have a reserve base, CFB Montreal, in Mercier-Ouest.

== Geography ==
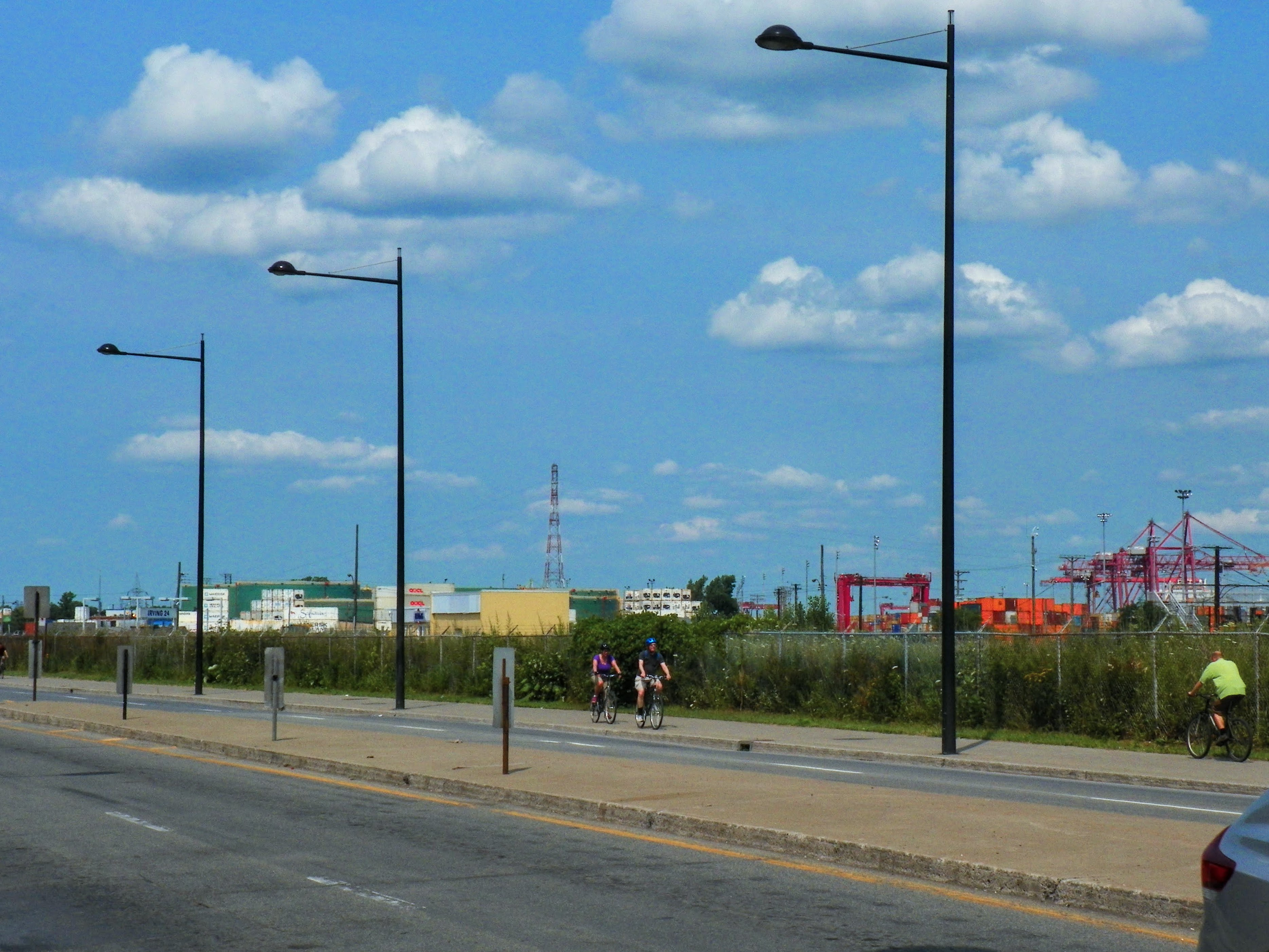
View of the port of Montreal from Rue Notre-Dame

Mercier is bordered roughly by the train tracks near Rue Viau to the west, Avenue Georges-V to the east, Rue Sherbrooke to the north, and the St-Lawrence River to the south.

Hochelaga-Maisonneuve is located to the west, Montréal-Est to the east, Rosemont to the northwest and Saint-Léonard and Anjou to the northeast.

Autoroute 25 divides the neighbourhood into Mercier-Est and Mercier-Ouest.

== Transportation ==
Mercier is served by the Assomption, Cadillac, Langelier, Radisson and Honoré-Beaugrand stations of the Green line. Assomption, Cadillac and Langelier stations are in Mercier-Ouest, whereas Radisson and Honoré-Beaugrand stations are in Mercier-Est. All of the stations mentioned above, except for Assomption, are located along Rue Sherbrooke Est.

Autoroute 25 cuts through Mercier, leading to the Louis-Hippolyte Lafontaine Tunnel.

Its main arteries running east to west are Rue Notre-Dame, Avenue Pierre De Coubertin, Rue Hochelaga and Rue Sherbrooke.

== Politics ==
Mercier is in the federal ridings of Hochelaga, Honoré-Mercier and La Pointe-de-l'Île.

Provincially it's located in the ridings of Bourget (renamed to Camille-Laurin in 2022) and Anjou-Louis-Riel.

At the Montreal city council it's represented in the municipal electoral districts of Maisonneuve–Longue-Pointe, Louis-Riel and Tétreaultville.

== Education ==
The Commission scolaire de Montréal (CSDM) operates French-language public schools.

=== Elementary ===
- École Notre-Dame-des-Victoires
- École Saint-Nom-de-Jésus
- École Louis Dupire
- École Saint-Fabien
- École Saint-Donat
- École Boucher-De La Bruère
- École Sainte-Louise-de-Marillac
- École Sainte-Claire
- École Saint-François-d'Assise
- École Saint-Justin
- École La Vérendrye
- École Irénée-Lussier
- École Armand-Lavergne
- École Philippe-Labarre

=== High school ===
- École Sécondaire Marguerite-De Lajemmerais
- École Secondaire Édouard-Montpetit
- École Secondaire Académie Dunton
- École Sécondaire Louise-Trichet

=== Specialized ===
- École des Métiers de l'aérospatiale de Montréal
- École de la Lancée (for boys with behavioural problems and in foster care)

The English Montreal School Board (EMSB) operates English-language schools.

==== Elementary ====
- Edward Murphy Elementary School

==== High school ====
(for high school, students must go to nearby Vincent Massey Collegiate in Rosemont)
