= Pink Line (Montreal Metro) =

Proposed Canadian subway

Overview
- Locale: Montreal, Quebec, Canada
- Transit type: Rapid transit
- Number of stations: 29 (planned)

Operation
- Operation will start: Unknown
- Operator: Société de transport de Montréal (STM)

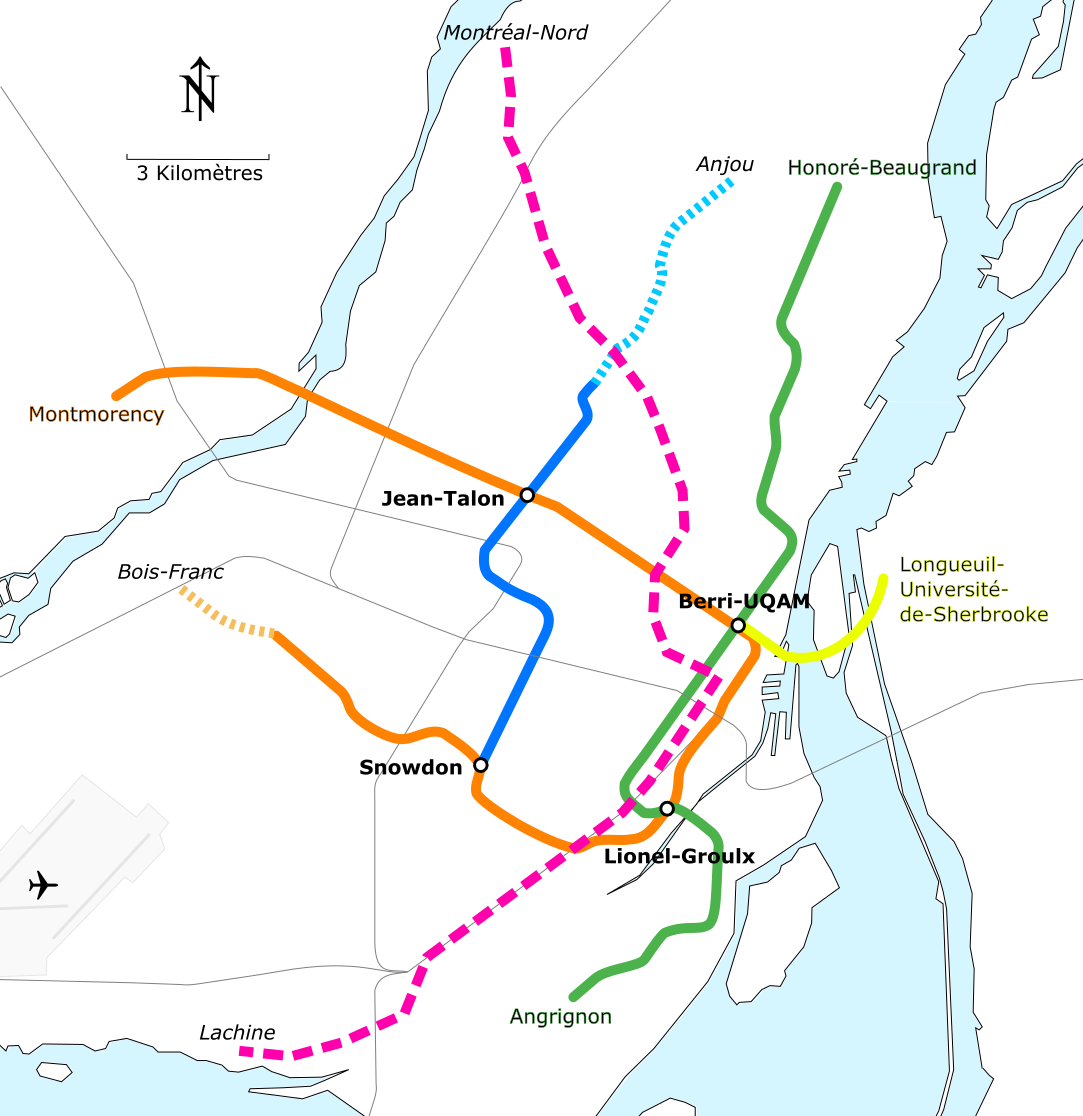
Proposed Pink Line route in 2017

The Pink Line (French: Ligne rose) was a subway line proposal for the Montreal Metro in Quebec. First proposed by municipal councillor Sylvain Ouellet in September 2011, the Pink Line in a modified form was a "central campaign promise" of the mayoral campaign of Valérie Plante, leader of the political party Projet Montréal and mayor of Montreal from 2017 to 2025.

The project was initially projected to cost CA$5.9 billion and scheduled to open in 2025. The project was subsequently added to Quebec's 10-year infrastructure plan, and feasibility studies for the line's western section began in June 2021. Since then, the project has been altered and a competing segment on the REM has also been proposed, bringing into question as to what form the Pink Line will take. As late as 2024, the project remained in the official transit plan, but there was never a timeline as to when it would be built.

The proposed route of the line would traverse many Montreal neighbourhoods. It would start in Montreal North, and travel southwest through the city, with connections to the blue line extension, Mont-Royal metro station, and Place-des-Arts station. Given this routing, the section from Montreal North to Pie-IX is generally seen as the successor to the cancelled White Line originally proposed in the 1980s. A second phase of the project would travel southwest from Downtown Montreal, through Westmount, the Notre-Dame-de-Grâce neighbourhood, Montreal West, and end at Lachine. This would be the first Montreal Metro line with above-ground stations.

== Stations ==
A total of 29 stations along the Pink Line were proposed in 2017.

Station	Borough or town	Location	Connection	Type
1	Montreal North	Léger & Langelier Boulevards		Underground
2	Montreal North	Rolland Boulevard		Underground
3	Montreal North	Place Bourassa		Underground
4	Saint-Léonard	Saint-Léonard–Montréal-Nord station	Mascouche line	Underground
5	Saint-Léonard	Viau & Lavoisier		Underground
6	Saint-Michel	Jarry & Pie-IX/Provencher		Underground
7	Saint-Michel	Jean-Talon & Pie-IX (Vertières Station)	Blue Line (Under construction)	Underground
8	Rosemont	Collège de Rosemont		Underground
9	Rosemont	Rosemont & St-Michel Boulevards		Underground
10	Rosemont	Masson		Underground
11	Rosemont	d'Iberville & St-Joseph		Underground
12	Plateau-Mont-Royal	Mt-Royal Avenue & Papineau/De Lorimier		Underground
13	Plateau-Mont-Royal	Mont-Royal Station	Orange Line	Underground
14	Plateau-Mont-Royal	Saint-Laurent Boulevard & Rachel		Underground
15	Plateau-Mont-Royal	Pine & Park Avenues		Underground
16	Ville-Marie	Place-des-Arts station	Green Line	Underground
17	Ville-Marie	Complexe Guy-Favreau and Palais des congrès		Underground
18	Ville-Marie	Montreal Central Station	Réseau express métropolitain	Underground
19	Ville-Marie	E-Commerce Place, René-Lévesque Boulevard		Underground
20	Ville-Marie	Canadian Centre for Architecture		Underground
21	Westmount	Greene Avenue		Surface
22	Notre-Dame-de-Grâce	Vendôme station	Orange Line	Surface
23	Notre-Dame-de-Grâce	Regent Street		Surface
24	Notre-Dame-de-Grâce	Cavendish Boulevard		Surface
25	Notre-Dame-de-Grâce	Montréal-Ouest station	Exo commuter rail	Surface
26	Lachine	Old Ville Saint-Pierre		Underground
27	Lachine	Victoria & George-V Streets		Surface
28	Lachine	Victoria Street & LaSalle Park		Surface
29	Lachine	Victoria Street & 32nd Avenue		Underground
