= Langelier Boulevard =

Thoroughfare in Montreal, Canada

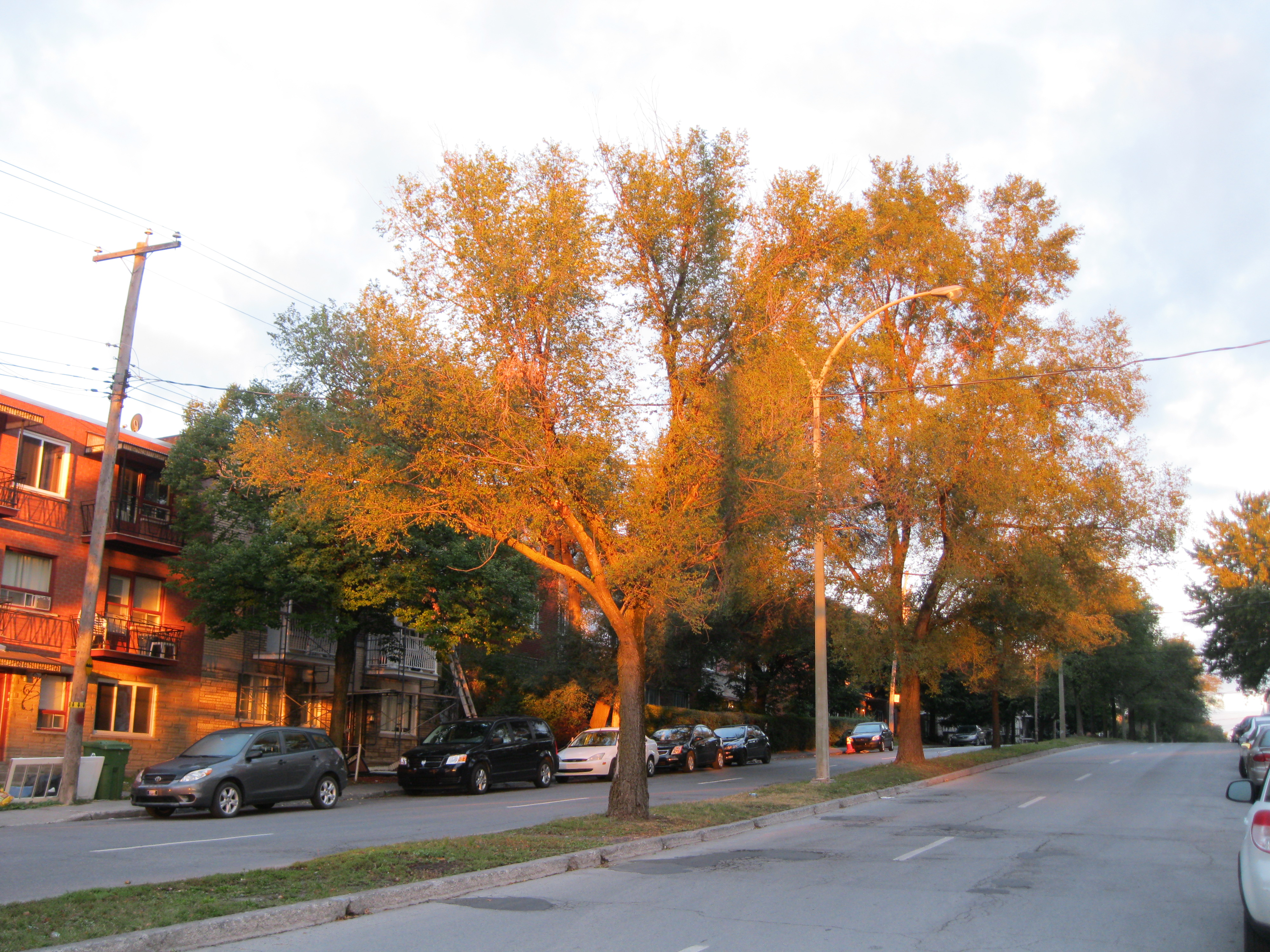
- Langelier Boulevard, north of Hochelaga Street, at sunrise
- Native name: Boulevard Langelier (French)
- Length: 8.7 km (5.4 mi)
- Location: Between Hochelaga Street and Gouin Boulevard
- South end: Hochelaga Street
- Major junctions: A-40 (TCH); R-138
- North end: Gouin Boulevard

Construction
- Inauguration: November 4, 1914

Langelier Boulevard (French: Boulevard Langelier) is a north–south artery of Montreal.

== Location and access ==
From north to south, this boulevard crosses three boroughs: Mercier—Hochelaga-Maisonneuve, Saint-Léonard and Montréal-Nord. At one important section, it connects Hochelaga Street to the south to Des Grandes-Prairies Boulevard to the north, and then another portion of the boulevard connects Henri-Bourassa Boulevard and Gouin Boulevard. The two sections of Langelier Boulevard are separated by train tracks.

Langelier metro station, part of the Montreal Metro's green line, is located at the street's intersection with Sherbrooke East Street. A planned extension of the Blue Line, which would include a station on Langelier Boulevard, has received funding, but is yet to be constructed. The street is also served primarily by the 33 Langelier bus.

Exit 78 of the Quebec Autoroute 40 leads to Langelier Boulevard.

== Name ==
The boulevard gets its name from Sir François Langelier, a lawyer, politician, and judge.

== History ==
Dedicated in 1914 on the territory of the City of Montreal, it took the name "Rue Langelier" (Langelier Street) in 1914. It became "Boulevard Langelier" (Langelier Boulevard) in 1968.

The boulevard expanded northwards according to residential and commercial developments that took place in the 1960s.

== Features ==
Much of the boulevard is bordered by residential developments, interspersed by small commercial establishments. A park, named after Felix Leclerc, lies near the intersection with Rue Beaubien.

Carrefour Langelier, a small-sized shopping centre, is located in Saint-Léonard at the intersection of the boulevard with Jean-Talon East Street. Among its anchor tenants, the mall has a Walmart (which replaced Woolco since the time of Walmart's expansion into Canada in 1994), and a movie theatre with six screens. The current owner of the theatre is CinéStarz, replacing the former Cinémas Guzzo Langelier 6 in 2013. The theatre shows films in French only (at the time of its opening, however, it showed movies in both English and French). In 2012, the Walmart became a Walmart Supercentre, without an increase to the store's retail space inside the mall.

Langelier Boulevard ends at the entrance to Canadian Forces Base Montreal, at the intersection with Rue Hochelaga.
