= Langelier station =

Montreal Metro station

Langelier
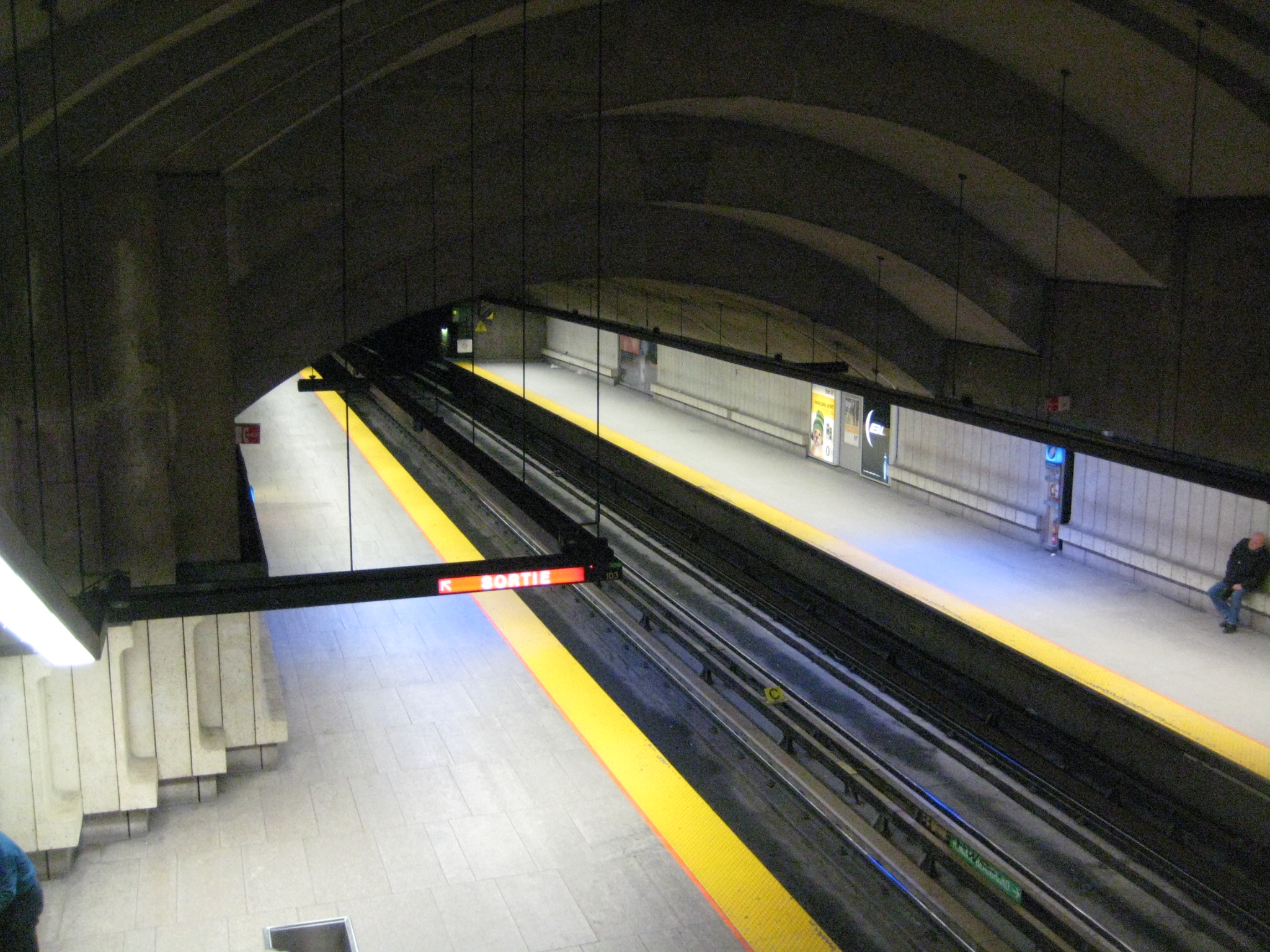

General information
- Location: Sherbrooke Street East at boul. Langelier; Montreal, Quebec H1N 1C5; Canada
- Coordinates: 45°34′58″N 73°32′35″W
- Operator: Société de transport de Montréal
- Platforms: 2 side platforms
- Tracks: 2
- Connections: STM bus

Construction
- Depth: 14.0 metres (45 feet 11 inches), 37th deepest
- Accessible: No
- Architect: Victor Prus & André G. Dionne

Other information
- Fare zone: ARTM: A

History
- Opened: 6 June 1976

Passengers
- 2024: 2,474,621 ▲11.03%
- Rank: 44 of 68

Services
Preceding station	Montreal Metro	Following station
Cadillac toward Angrignon	Green Line	Radisson toward Honoré-Beaugrand
Location

Langelier station is a Montreal Metro station in the borough of Mercier–Hochelaga-Maisonneuve in Montreal, Quebec, Canada. It is operated by the Société de transport de Montréal (STM) and serves the Green Line. It is in the district of Mercier-Ouest. The station opened on June 6, 1976, as part of the extension of the Green Line to Honoré-Beaugrand station.

== Overview ==
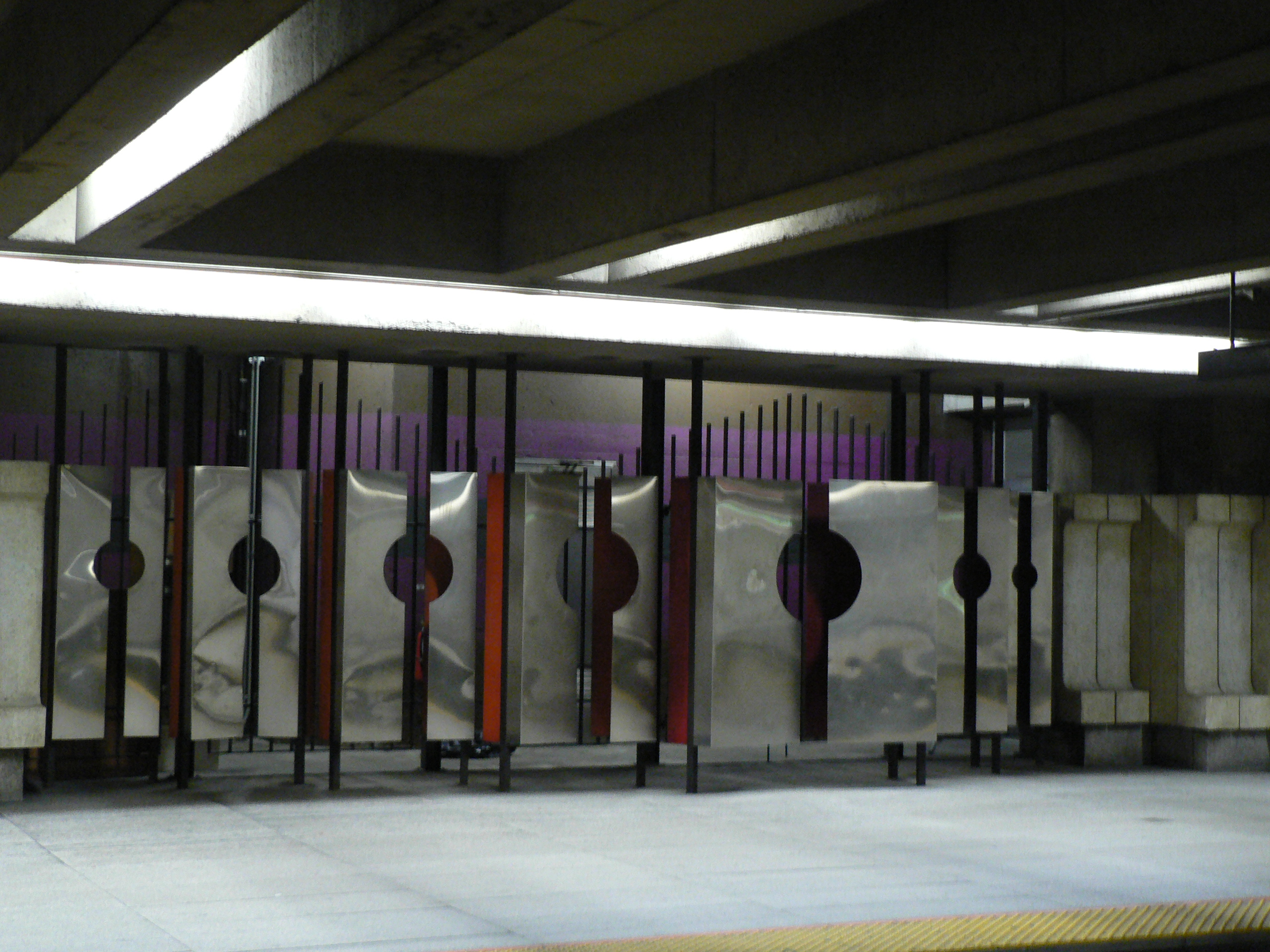
Art in Langelier station

Designed by Victor Prus & André G. Dionne, it is a normal side platform station built in tunnel. The central mezzanine, built within the tunnel vault, gives access to three entrances on three corners at the intersection of Sherbrooke Street East and Langelier Boulevard.

6595, rue Sherbrooke est
6610, rue Sherbrooke est
3355, boul. Langelier

On the platforms, sculptural grilles by Charles Daudelin conceal ventilation intakes.

== Origin of the name ==
The station is located on rue Sherbrooke Est at boulevard Langelier, named for Sir François Langelier (1838–1915), who served in a number of high offices in Quebec, including mayor of Quebec City (1882–1890) and Lieutenant-Governor (1911–1915).

== Connecting bus routes ==
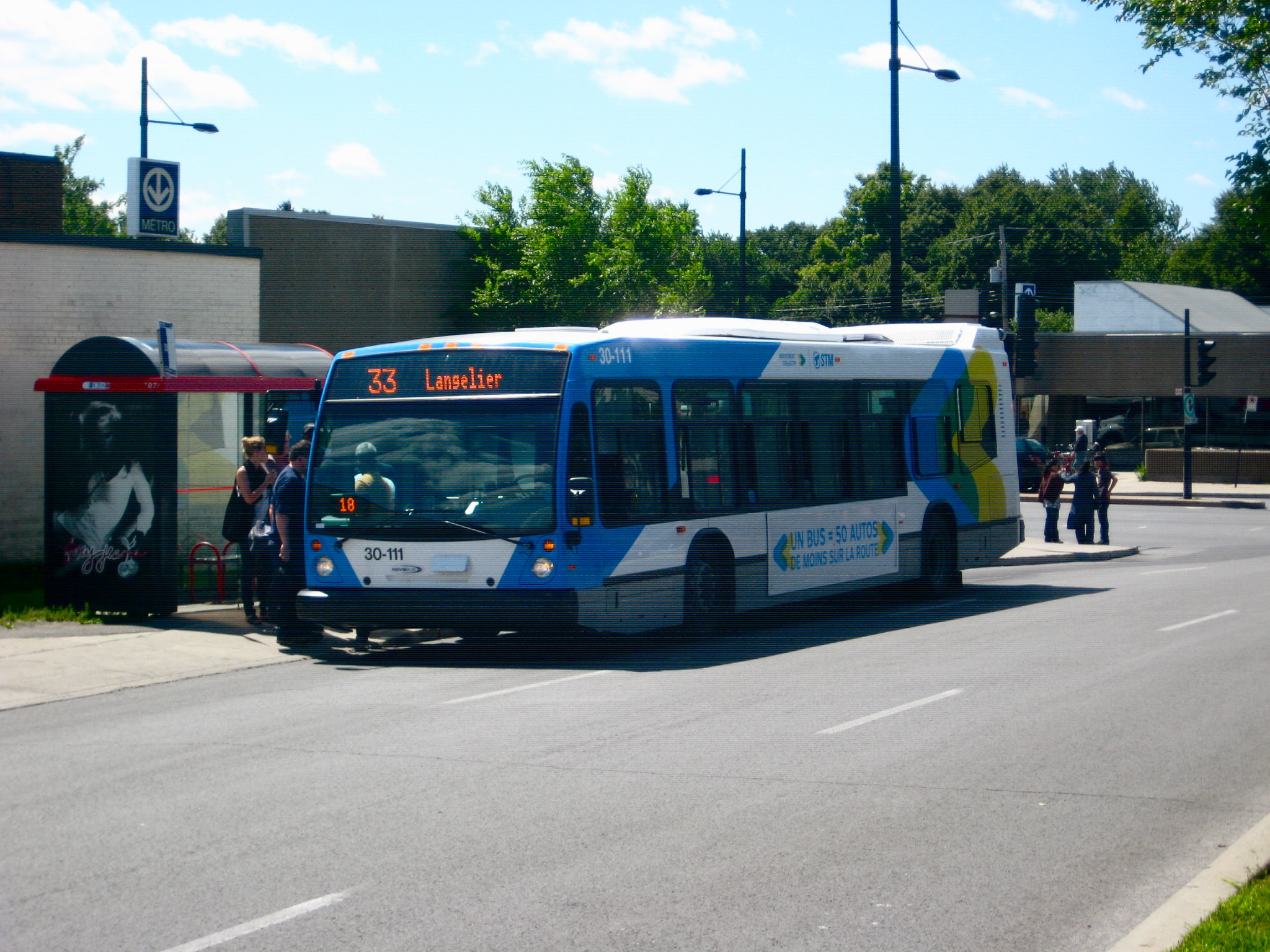
A bus at Langelier station.

Société de transport de Montréal
No.	Route	Connects to	Service times / notes
33	Langelier	Saint-Léonard-Montréal-Nord	Daily
185	Sherbrooke	Radisson; Cadillac; Frontenac	Daily
197	Rosemont	Pie-IX BRT; Rosemont	Daily
364 ☾	Sherbrooke / Joseph-Renaud	Honoré-Beaugrand; Radisson; Cadillac; Frontenac; Bonaventure; Gare Centrale; Terminus Centre-ville; Lucien-L'Allier; Atwater	Night service
370 ☾	Rosemont	Honoré-Beaugrand; Radisson; Rosemont; Outremont; Plamondon	Night service
811	Health Services Shuttle	Radisson; Cadillac; Assomption	Weekdays only Created to compensate for construction on Louis-Hippolyte Lafontaine Bridge–Tunnel
822	Longue-Pointe Shuttle	Radisson	Weekdays only Created to compensate for construction on Louis-Hippolyte Lafontaine Bridge–Tunnel

== Nearby points of interest ==
- Carrefour Langelier - (With bus 33 north)
- Centre commercial Domaine
- Bibliothèque Langelier
- Saint-François d'Assise Cemetery
- Canadian Forces Base Montréal garrison ASU Longue-Pointe
