= Charles Daudelin =

Canadian sculptor and painter (1920–2001)

Charles Daudelin GOQ RCA
- Born: October 1, 1920; Granby, Quebec, Canada
- Died: April 2, 2001 (aged 80); Pointe-Claire, Quebec, Canada
- Known for: sculptor, painter
- Spouse: Louise Bissonette (m. 1946)

Charles Daudelin (October 1, 1920 – April 2, 2001) was a Canadian artist who was a pioneer in modern sculpture and painting. He worked in a wide variety of media, including painting, metal and ceramic sculpture, jewelry, and marionettes which he made with his wife, Louise.

== Life and work ==
Charles Daudelin was born on October 1, 1920, in Granby, Quebec. In 1939, he moved to Montreal, where he worked for the silversmith Gilles Beaugrand, a childhood friend of Paul-Émile Borduas. While still working for Beaugrand, he enrolled in evening classes at the École du meuble in Montreal, then attended full-time in 1941. He joined the Contemporary Arts Society in 1941. In May 1943, he and 22 other artists under the age of thirty, including several students of Borduas at the École du Meuble, took part in the Sagittarius exhibition at the Dominion Gallery, organized by Maurice Gagnon, professor at the École du Meuble, and which would constitute a milestone in the history of the Automatistes. Daudelin exhibited several works there, including sculptures. In September 1943, in Granby, Daudelin's first solo exhibition took place, also organized by Maurice Gagnon.

Between 1944 and 1945, Daudelin made two visits to New York City, where he visited the atelier of Fernand Léger. Between 1946 and 1948, he spent time in Paris, where he regularly saw Léger and met the sculptor Henri Laurens, who he would meet a number of times, and was afterwards influenced by Laurens' organic form.

He married Louise Bissonette in 1946, who worked with him.

He taught at the École des beaux-arts in Montréal until 1967. He became a pioneer in integrating art into public space. He created many public artworks, including:

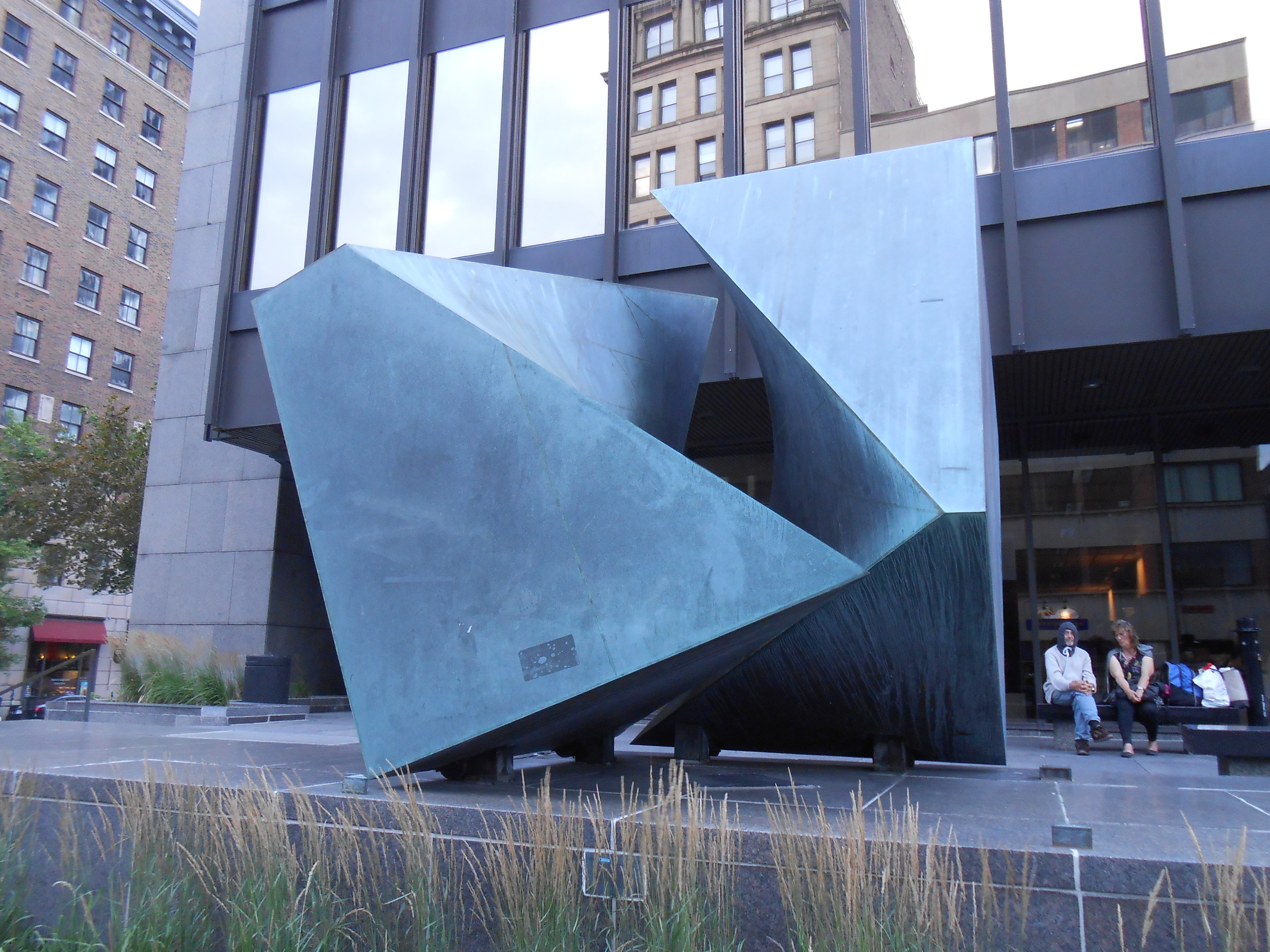
Allegrocube (1973)

- Polypède (1967), McGill University, Montreal
- Allegrocube (1973), Palais de justice de Montréal;
- the altar screen for the Sacré-Coeur chapel for Notre-Dame Basilica, Montreal;
- Agora (1981), Viger Square, Montreal
- Embâcle (1984), Place du Québec, Paris;
- aluminum joints at Mont-Royal station and large sculptural grilles at Langelier station in the Montreal metro.

The Musée d'art contemporain de Montréal and the Musée national des beaux-arts du Québec mounted a major retrospective of Daudelin's work in 1974. In 1997, the Musée national des beaux-arts du Québec presented Daudelin with a retrospective of his career shown through over 180 of his works. His work is in the Musée national des beaux-arts du Québec (117 works), the Montreal Museum of Fine Arts the Robert McLaughlin Gallery, Oshawa and the National Gallery of Canada, Ottawa.

Daudelin lived in Kirkland, Quebec, and died in nearby Pointe-Claire, Quebec. His last work, Le Passage du 2 avril, is named for the date of his death and installed in front of Kirkland City Hall.

A postage stamp depicting Daudelin's work Embâcle was issued by Canada Post on June 10, 2002.

Daudelin's Kirkland home, which had been designated a protected heritage site by Quebec's Ministry of Culture and Communications in 2023, burned down on December 29, 2024.

== Honours ==
- Second prize, Concours artistiques du Québec for painting (1946) and sculpture (1964, 1969)
- Victor Martyn Lynch-Staunton Award from the Canada Council for the Arts (1971)
- Prix Philippe-Hébert from the St-Jean-Baptiste Society of Montréal (1981)
- Prix Paul-Émile-Borduas, Government of Quebec (1985)
- Royal Canadian Academy of Arts (1985)
- Academy of Great Montrealers in the Cultural category (1994)
- Grand Officier, Ordre national du Québec (1998)
- Commander of the Ordre de Montréal (2016)

== Images ==
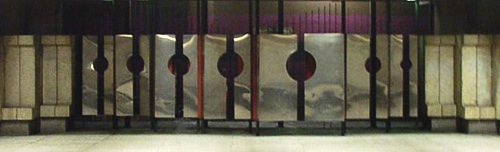
Sculptural grille, at Langelier metro station in Montreal

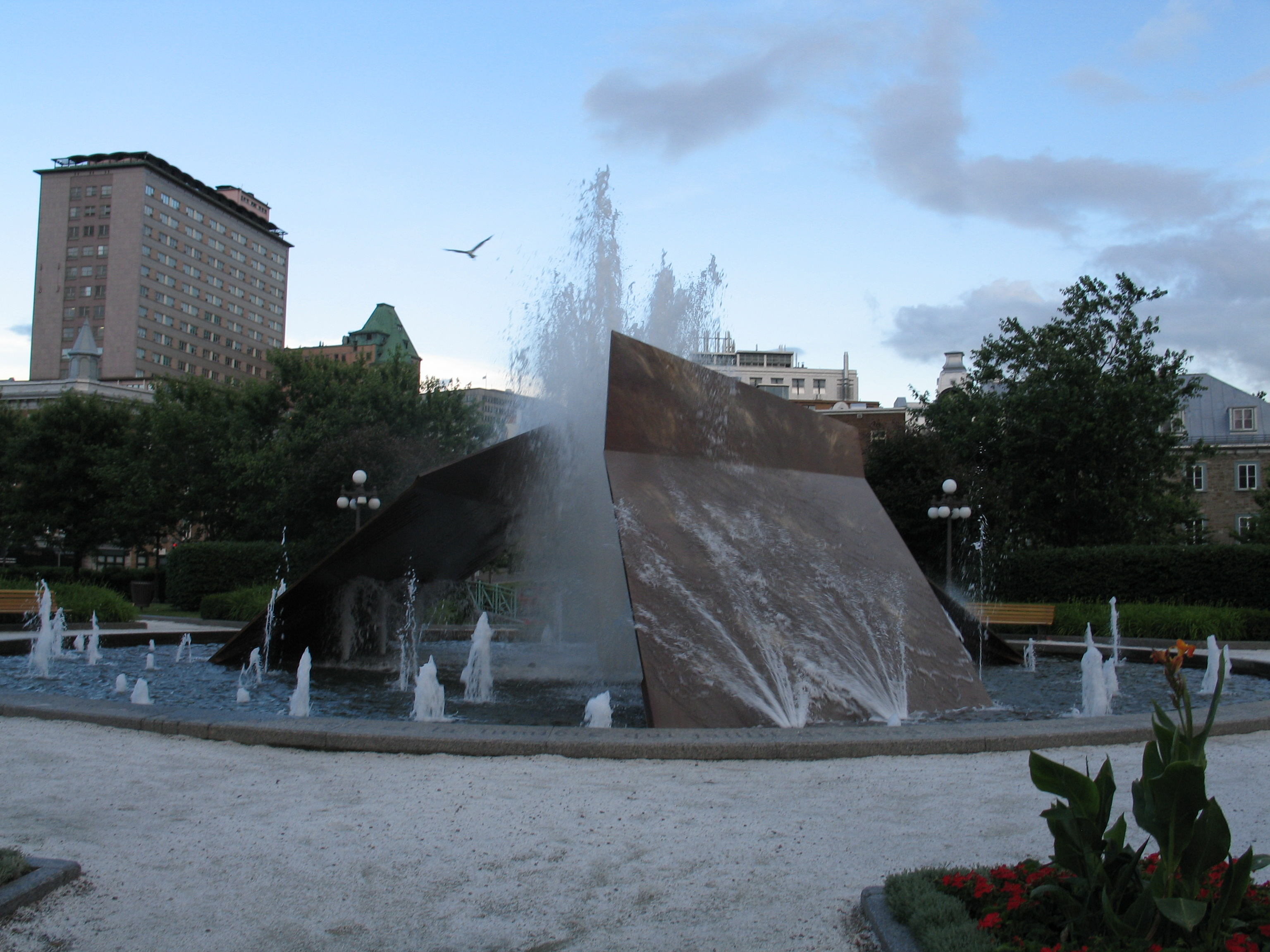
Éclatement II, fountain in front of the Gare du Palais, in Quebec City

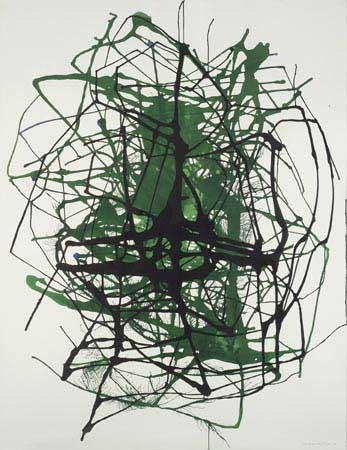
Circuit 5, 1994, ink on paper, 127 x 98 cm.

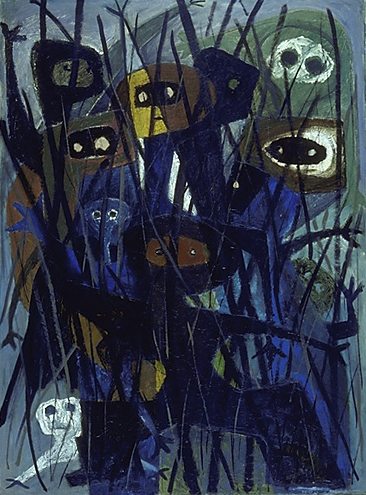
La Brousse, 1954–1958, oil on hardboard, 142 x 106 cm.

== Controversy ==
In 2015, it was announced that Daudelin's public art piece, Agora in Viger Square, which had been meant to mimic the gardens of Greek antiquity, would be replaced with a minimalist park. However, in 2016, the makeover stalled since the Square sits on top of Ville-Marie Expressway, which is provincial jurisdiction. Work began on the area of the square referred to as the îlot Daudelin, and many of the concrete structures there, created by Charles Daudelin, were demolished. Others were restored and there were plans for better lighting and new drainage and sewer systems. As of 2019, the redevelopment was due to be completed in 2021 with a cost of 63.2 million, almost double the initial amount.
