= Promenade Bellerive Park =

Urban park in Montreal, Canada

- Parc de la Promenade-Bellerive
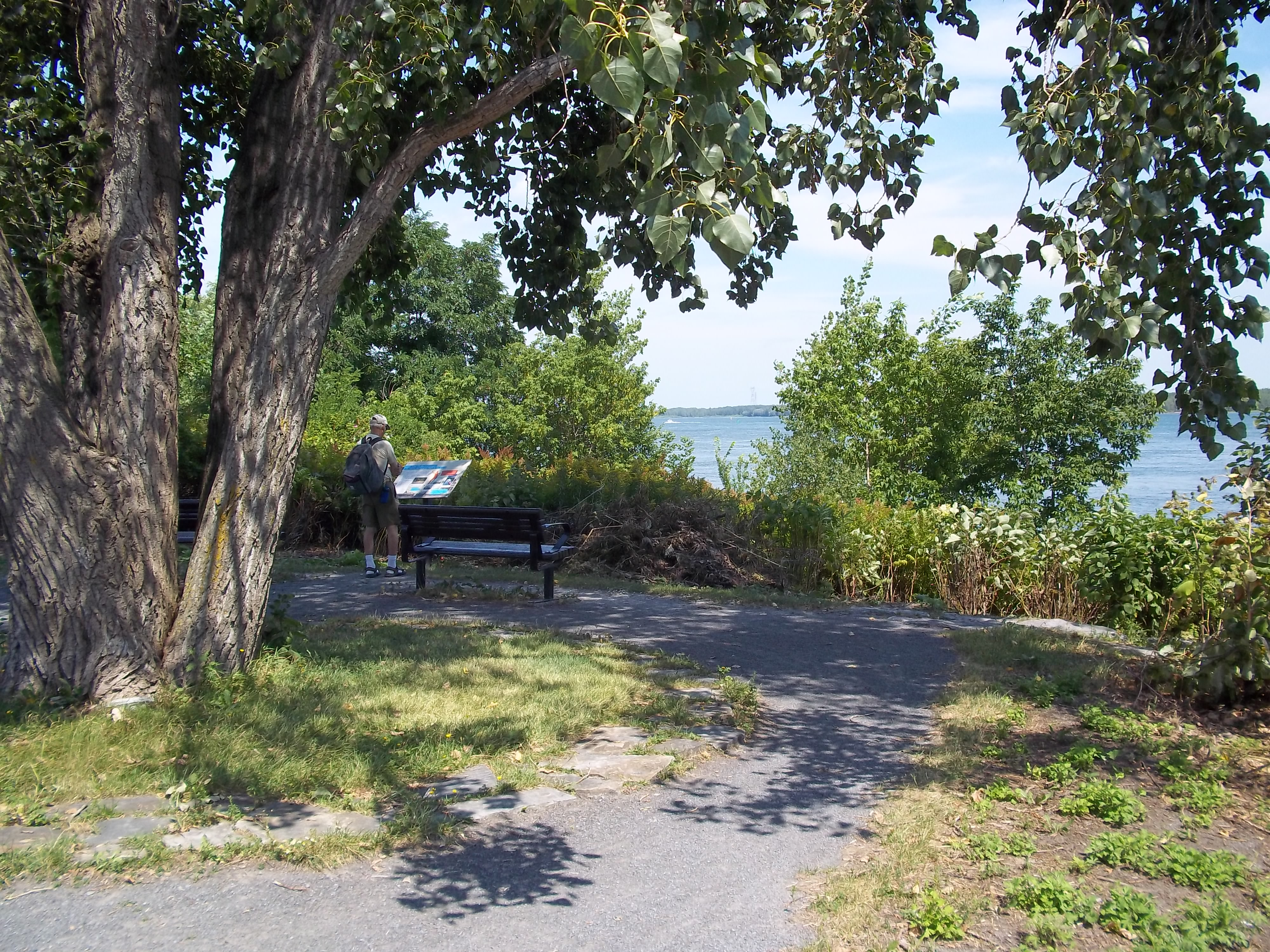
- A path in the park
- Interactive map of Promenade Bellerive Park
- Type: Urban park
- Location: Mercier–Hochelaga-Maisonneuve, Montreal, Quebec, Canada
- Coordinates: 45°36′04″N 73°30′36″W
- Area: 22 hectares (54 acres)
- Operator: City of Montreal
- Open: 6:00 a.m. to 12:00 a.m.
- Status: Open all year
- Public transit: STM Bus: 22, 28, 185, 430
- Website: Parc de la Promenade-Bellerive

Promenade Bellerive Park (French: Parc de la Promenade-Bellerive) is an urban park in the Mercier–Hochelaga-Maisonneuve borough of Montreal, Quebec, Canada. It is located in between Notre Dame Street East and the Saint Lawrence River. It is 22 hectares (54 acres) large. Throughout its approximately 2km length, it faces the Boucherville Islands and Charron Island. A ferry service to Charron Island runs during the summer.

== History ==
The City of Montreal obtained the land that would become Promenade Bellerive Park in 1893, following a land swap with the Canadian Pacific Railway (CPR). As part of the deal, CPR obtained a piece of land in Old Montreal on which Place Viger would eventually be constructed. In the 1960s, the City of Montreal first announced its plans to convert its waterfront land into a park. Earth from the digging of the Louis-Hippolyte Lafontaine Bridge-Tunnel was dumped on the site, and enlarged the piece of land by 800 feet (240 m) over more than a distance of over 2.2 kilometres (1.4 mi). The land was then used for the storage of road salt. During the winter the land was used by the city to dump snow into the river.

Local citizens became frustrated at the slow pace it took for site to be transformed into a park. They worked with their local elected officials to facilitate the beginning of the work. In 1995, a floating dock was installed, providing summer ferry service to the Boucherville Islands. In 1997, most of the landscaping work was done and the welcome centre was built.

== Art ==
Continuum 2009 (à la mémoire de Pierre Perrault)
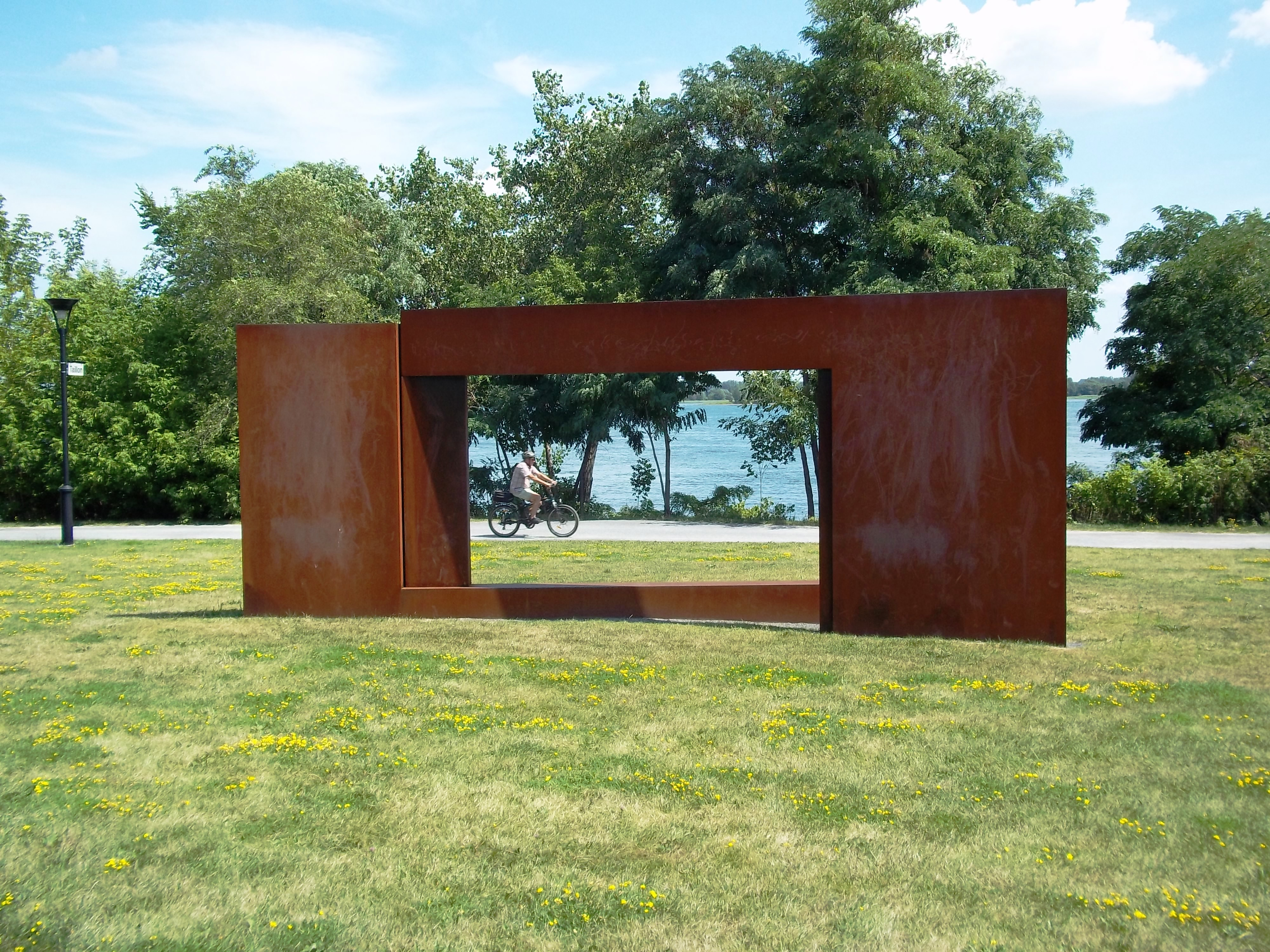
- Artist: Roland Poulin
- Completion date: 2009
- Medium: Sculpture
- Dimensions: 305 cm × 770 cm × 300 cm (120 in × 300 in × 120 in)
- Location: Mercier–Hochelaga-Maisonneuve, Montreal, Quebec, Canada
- Owner: City of Montreal
- Accession: 29 May 2009

In 2009, the sculpture Continuum 2009 (à la mémoire de Pierre Perrault) was installed in the park. It is a three-element abstract artwork made of weathering steel. The sculpture was created by Roland Poulin, in tribute to the filmmaker Pierre Perrault. Three elements form a series of vertical and horizontal planes that frame an empty space. People can enter the artwork by walking through its frame.
