= Cadillac station =

Montreal Metro station

Cadillac
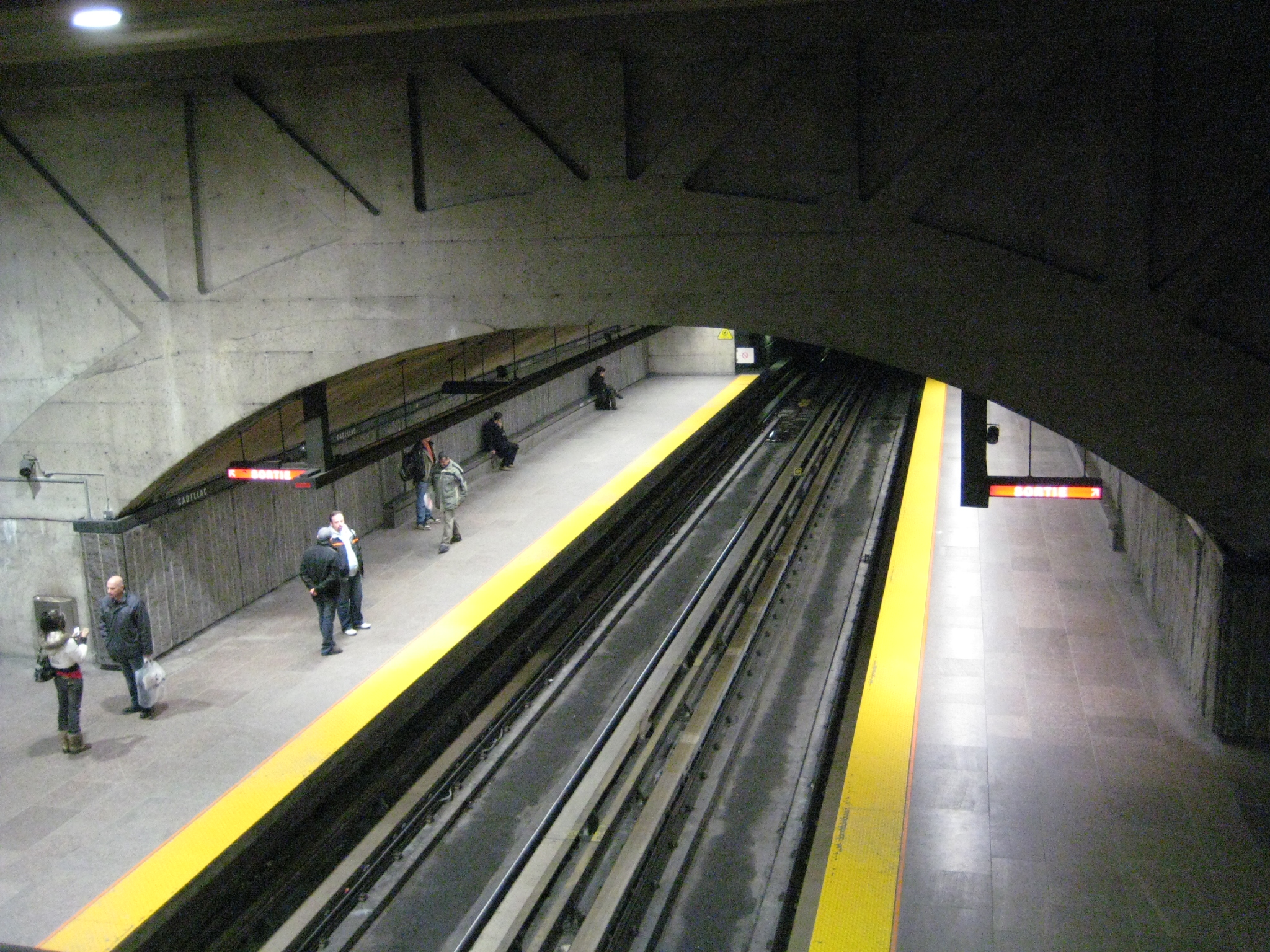

General information
- Location: 5995, Sherbrooke Street East and 3315, rue de Cadillac; Montreal, Quebec H1N 1B7; Canada
- Coordinates: 45°34′37″N 73°32′48″W
- Operator: Société de transport de Montréal
- Platforms: 2 side platforms
- Tracks: 2
- Connections: STM bus

Construction
- Depth: 12.2 metres (40 feet), 42nd deepest
- Accessible: No
- Architect: Longpré, Marchand, Goudreau, Dobush, Stewart, et Bourke

Other information
- Fare zone: ARTM: A

History
- Opened: 6 June 1976

Passengers
- 2024: 2,200,419 ▲10.97%
- Rank: 49 of 68

Services
Preceding station	Montreal Metro	Following station
Assomption toward Angrignon	Green Line	Langelier toward Honoré-Beaugrand
Location

Cadillac station is a Montreal Metro station in the borough of Mercier–Hochelaga-Maisonneuve in Montreal, Quebec, Canada. It is operated by the Société de transport de Montréal (STM) and serves the Green Line. It is in the district of Mercier-Ouest. The station opened on June 6, 1976, as part of the extension of the Green Line to Honoré-Beaugrand station.

== Overview ==
Designed by Longpré, Marchand, Goudreau, Dobush, Stewart, et Bourke, it is a normal side platform station built in tunnel. The central mezzanine gives access to the entrances diagonally across from one another at the corner of rue de Cadillac and rue Sherbrooke. The hallways to these entrances feature complementary murals by Jean Cartier.

== Origin of the name ==
This station is named for rue de Cadillac, itself named after Antoine Laumet, dit de La Mothe sieur de Cadillac (1658–1730) — a colourful French explorer of New France who founded Detroit, Michigan and commanded it from 1701 to 1710. Despite his name being pronounced as \ka.di.jak\ in French, the station is pronounced as \ka.di.lak\. The STM has corrected this pronunciation issue as of August 2022 .

== Connecting bus routes ==
Société de transport de Montréal
No.	Route	Connects to	Service times / notes
32	Lacordaire	Saint-Léonard-Montréal-Nord	Daily
185	Sherbrooke	Honoré-Beaugrand; Radisson; Langelier; Frontenac	Daily
364 ☾	Sherbrooke / Joseph-Renaud	Honoré-Beaugrand; Radisson; Langelier; Frontenac; Bonaventure; Gare Centrale; Terminus Centre-ville; Lucien-L'Allier; Atwater	Night service
432	Express Lacordaire	Radisson; Saint-Léonard-Montréal-Nord	Weekdays only Certain trips start or end at Radisson station
811	Health Services Shuttle	Radisson; Langelier; Assomption	Weekdays only Created to compensate for construction on Louis-Hippolyte Lafontaine Bridge–Tunnel

== Nearby points of interest ==
- Sanctuaire Marie-Reine-des-Coeurs
- Centre hospitalier Grace-Dart
