= Assomption station =

Montreal Metro station

Assomption
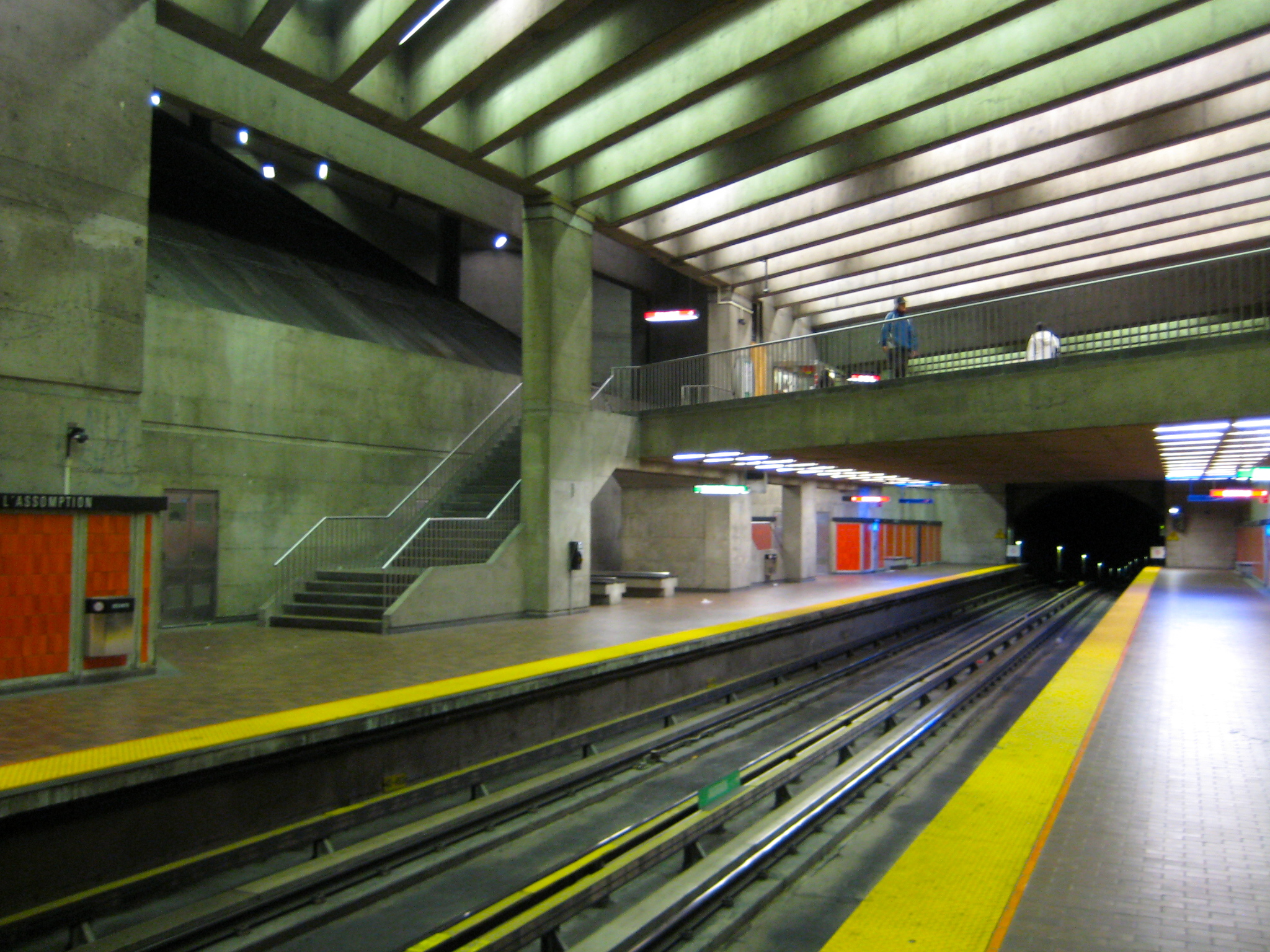

General information
- Location: 3075, boul de l'Assomption; Montreal, Quebec H1N 2H1; Canada
- Coordinates: 45°34′09″N 73°32′49″W
- Operator: Société de transport de Montréal
- Platforms: 2 side platforms
- Tracks: 2
- Connections: STM buses

Construction
- Depth: 19.2 metres (63 feet), 16th deepest
- Accessible: No
- Architect: Duplessis et Labelle

Other information
- Fare zone: ARTM: A

History
- Opened: After 6 June 1976

Passengers
- 2024: 1,335,163 ▲16.61%
- Rank: 63 of 68

Services
Preceding station	Montreal Metro	Following station
Viau toward Angrignon	Green Line	Cadillac toward Honoré-Beaugrand
Location

Assomption station is a Montreal Metro station situated in the Mercier–Hochelaga-Maisonneuve borough of Montreal, Quebec. Managed by the Société de transport de Montréal (STM), it facilitates commuters along the Green Line and resides within the Hochelaga-Maisonneuve district. The station opened some time after 6 June 1976, as part of the extension of the Green Line to Honoré-Beaugrand.

== Overview ==
Designed by Duplessis and Labelle, Assomption station features a conventional side platform layout constructed primarily from concrete and partially situated within a tunnel. Access to the station is facilitated through a deep open cut that leads to a single entrance. Notably, the station's entrance building and the hallways leading to the stairwell have murals painted by Guy Montpetit.

In 2022, the STM's Universal Accessibility Report noted that preliminary design work to make the station accessible was underway.

== Origin of the name ==
This station, formerly known as L'Assomption, (a name that can still be observed on the station's nameplates), derives its name from Assomption boulevard. The boulevard was named as such in 1951, commemorating Pope Pius XII's affirmation of the dogma of the Assumption of Mary in his 1950 apostolic constitution, Munificentissimus Deus.

== Connecting bus routes ==
Société de transport de Montréal
No.	Route	Connects to	Service times / notes
22	Notre-Dame		Daily
131	De l'Assomption		Daily
811	Health Services Shuttle	Radisson; Langelier; Cadillac	Weekdays only Created to compensate for construction on Louis-Hippolyte Lafontaine Bridge–Tunnel

== Nearby points of interest ==
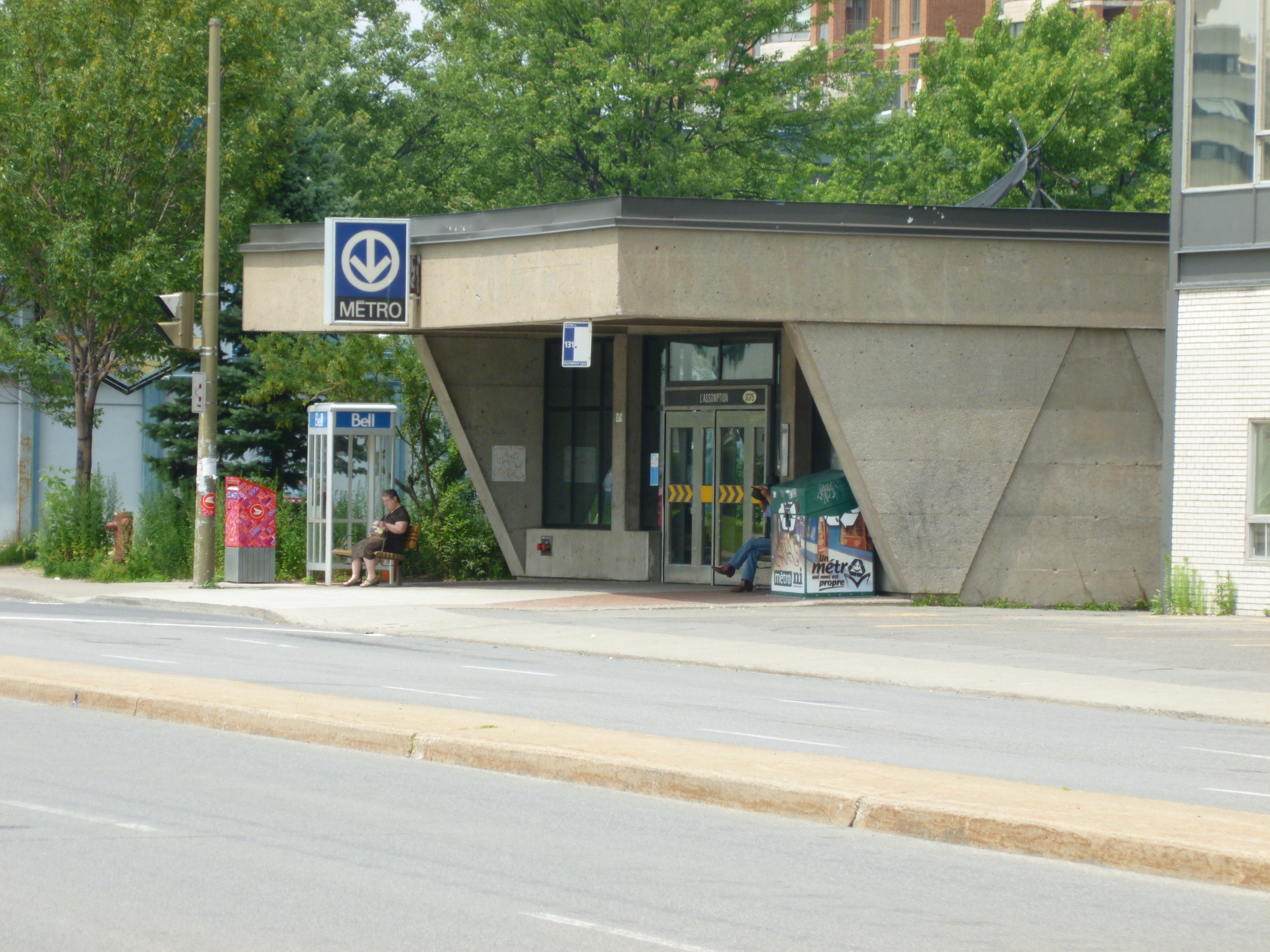
Bus stop outside the station

- Hôpital Maisonneuve-Rosemont
- Municipal golf course
- CLSC Olivier-Guimond
- Complexe Raycom
- Village Olympique
