= Saint-Léonard–Montréal-Nord station =

Railway station in Quebec, Canada

Saint-Léonard–Montréal-Nord
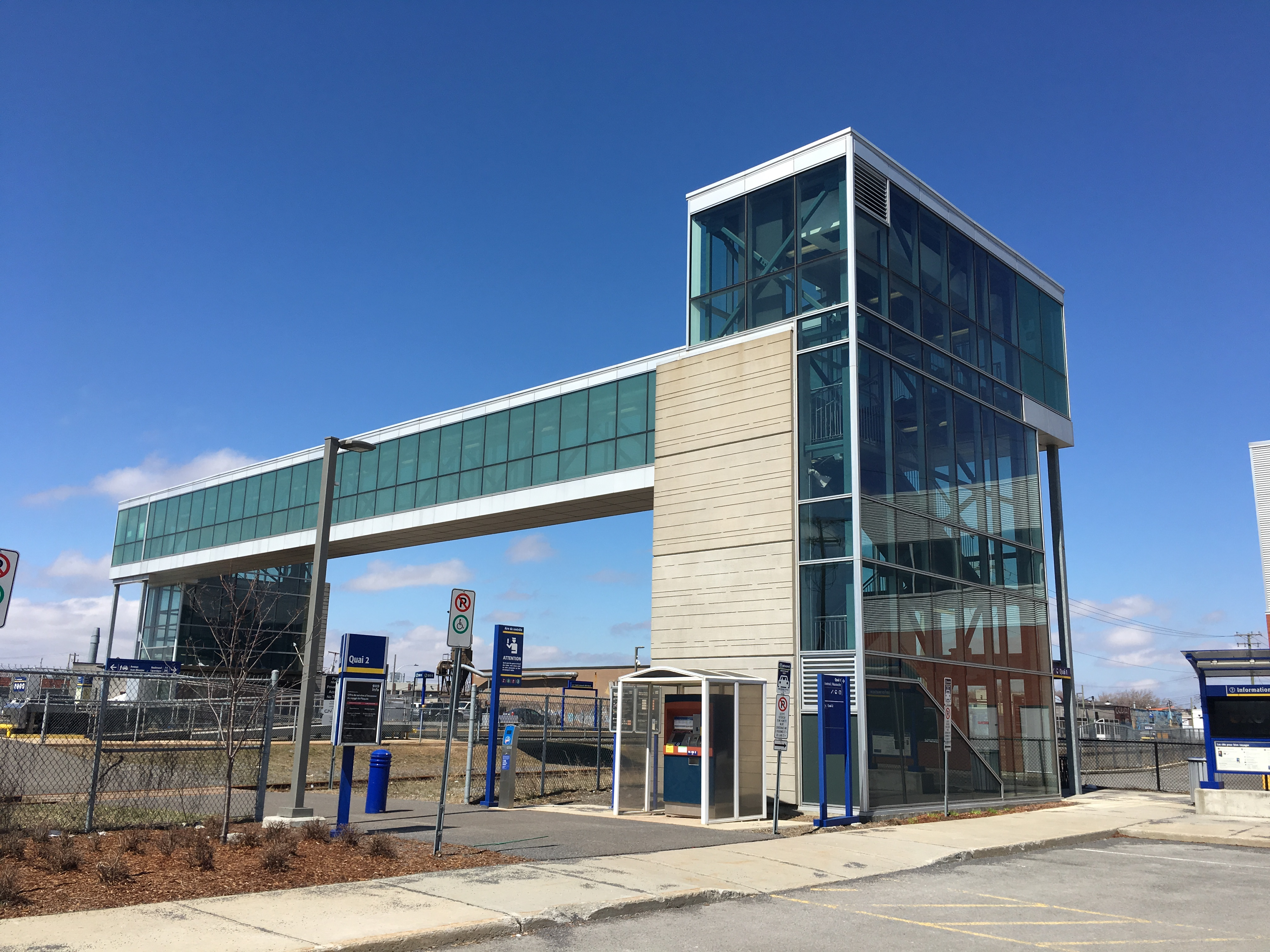

General information
- Location: 10710 Lacordaire Boulevard; Montréal-Nord, Quebec H1G 4N6
- Coordinates: 45°36′05″N 73°36′53″W
- Operator: Exo
- Platforms: 2 side platforms (1 in active use)
- Tracks: 2
- Connections: STM bus

Construction
- Parking: 179 Park-and-Ride, 3 Carpooling, and 6 Disabled spaces
- Cycle facilities: 30 spaces
- Accessible: Yes

Other information
- Fare zone: ARTM: A
- Website: Saint-Léonard–Montréal-Nord (exo)

History
- Opened: December 1, 2014

Passengers
- 2019: 147,500 (Exo)

Services
Preceding station	Exo	Following station
Anjou toward Mascouche	Line 15 – Mascouche	Saint-Michel–Montréal-Nord toward Côte-de-Liesse
Former services at Montreal Nord
Preceding station	Canadian National Railway	Following station
Ste. Gertrude toward Montreal	Montreal – Rawdon; Local stops	Riviere des Prairies toward Rawdon
Location

Saint-Léonard—Montréal-Nord station (French pronunciation: [sɛ̃ leɔnaʁ mɔ̃ʁeal nɔʁ]) is a commuter rail station operated by Exo on the boundary between the boroughs of Saint-Léonard and Montréal-Nord in Montreal, Quebec, Canada. It is served by the Mascouche line.

The station is located immediately southwest of Boulevard Lacordaire south of Boulevard Industriel. The station, built at grade, possesses two low-level side platforms: platform 1 on the north side and platform 2, which is shorter, on the south side. Most trains use platform 1. Both platforms are wheelchair accessible and feature raised wheelchair platforms with ramps to provide access to the trains.

The station has two buildings. One, located at the northeastern end of the station on Boulevard Lacordaire, provides elevator access to platform 1, as well as adjacent outdoor stairs (Boulevard Lacordaire is built in a cutting and passes under the tracks at this point). The second is an enclosed overhead walkway passing over the tracks, providing stair and elevator access between the platforms and connecting to the station's main parking lot to the south. Platform 2 also opens onto this parking lot via a walkway, and another walkway connects the southwest end of platform 1 with a park-and-ride lot north of the station on Avenue Jean-Meunier.

A mural by Sylvain Bouthillette entitled Flux is located on the exterior walls of the Boulevard Lacordaire headhouse.

== Connecting bus routes ==
Société de transport de Montréal
No.	Route	Connects to	Service times / notes
32	Lacordaire	Cadillac	Daily
33	Langelier	Langelier	Daily
432	Express Lacordaire	Cadillac; Radisson	Weekdays only Certain trips start or end at Radisson station
440	Express Charleroi	Sauvé; Saint-Michel-Montréal-Nord; Pie-IX BRT	Weekdays, peak only
