= La Fermière =

Monument in Montreal, Canada

La Fermière Monument
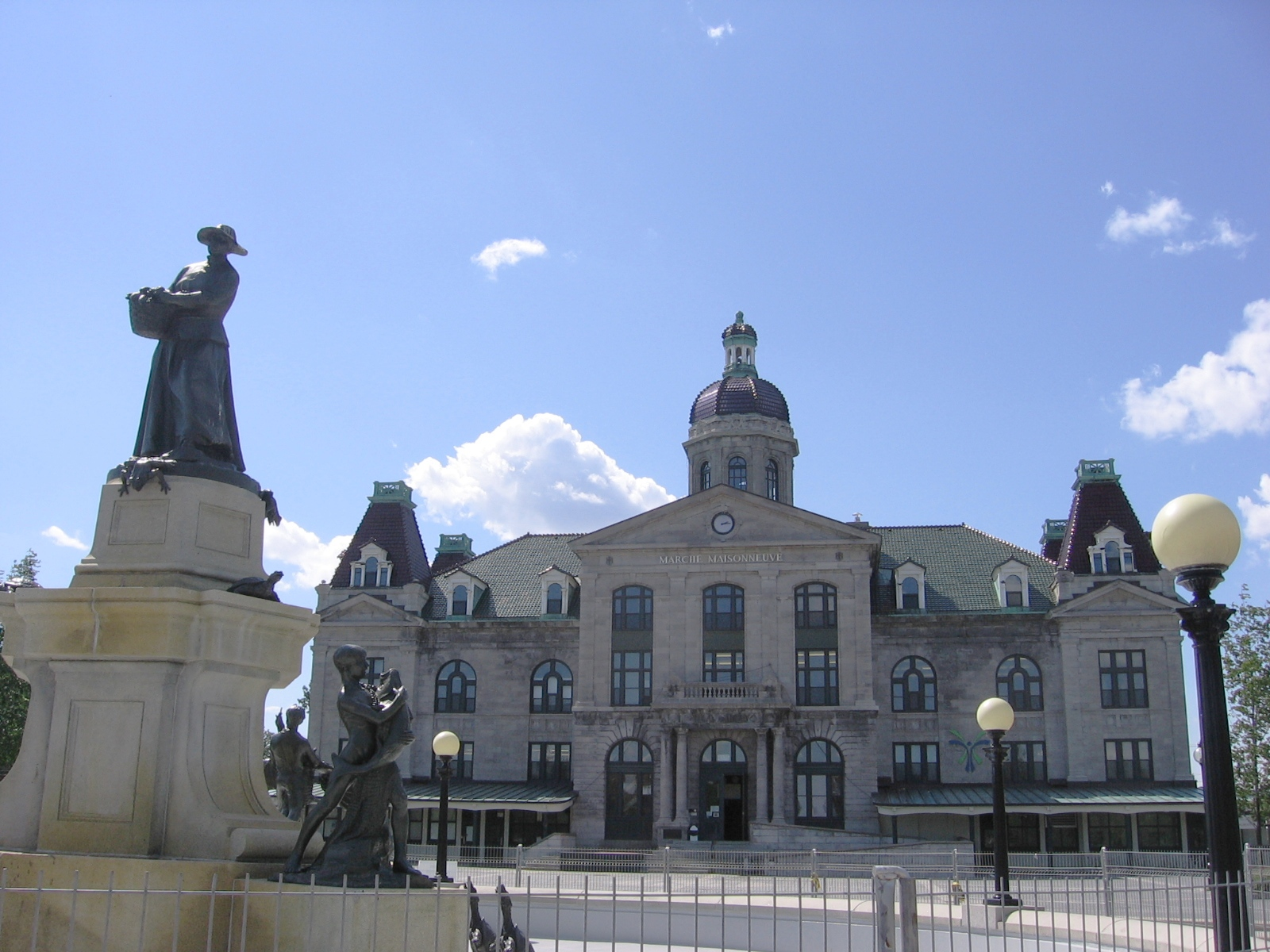
- The Fermière and Maisonneuve Market
- Interactive map of La Fermière Monument
- Location: Ontario Street (Montreal)
- Coordinates: 45.55355°N 73.53970°W
- Designer: Alfred Laliberté
- Type: Monument
- Material: Bronze, granite
- Height: 5.75 metres (18.9 ft)
- Opening date: 1915
- Dedicated to: Louise Mauger

La Fermière is a monument in Montreal. It is a statue by Alfred Laliberté, depicting local historical figure Louise Mauger as a market gardener.

== Overview ==
The fountain monument of Marius Dufresne is composed of a statue by Alfred Laliberté (1877–1953) which depicts a market gardener of the 17th century. Alfred Laliberté knows the history and heroes of French colonization. Without naming her, this monument refers to Louise Mauger (1598–1690).

Born in France in 1598, she married Pierre Gadoys, around 1620, and had three children, two born in France and the last one in Quebec City. In 1648, her husband received from Paul Chomedey de Maisonneuve, the first land grant of Montreal, a property of 40 arpents (140,000 m^{2}), making him the first farmer in Montreal. She was buried on March 18, 1690, in Montreal.

The monument was completed in 1915. La Fermière is situated in front of the Maisonneuve Market; the market is on Ontario Street and is at the head of the Morgan Boulevard.

== Gallery ==
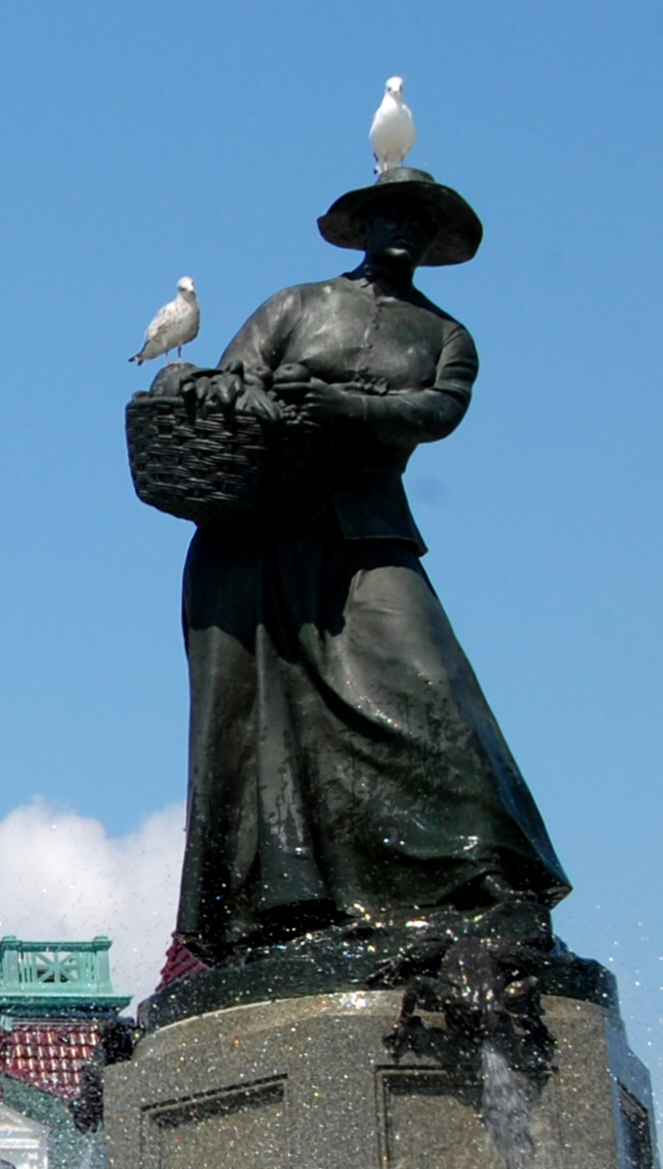
Statue detail

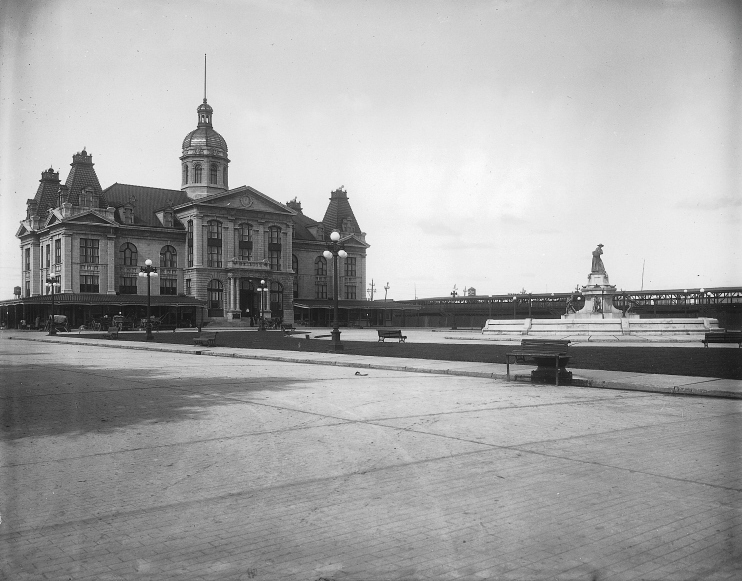
In 1916

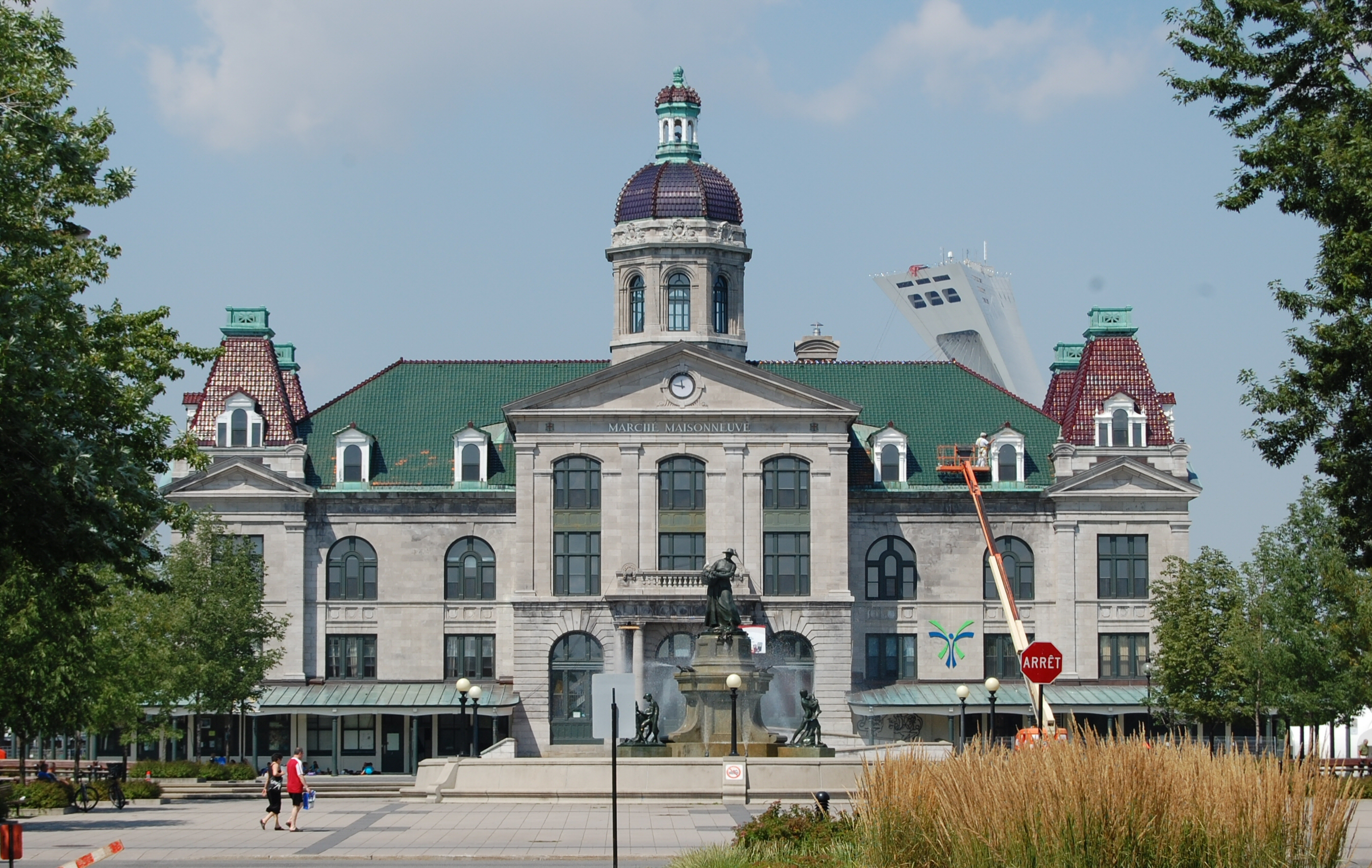

== Notes ==
- La Fermière
