= Hochelaga-Maisonneuve =

- Neighbourhood
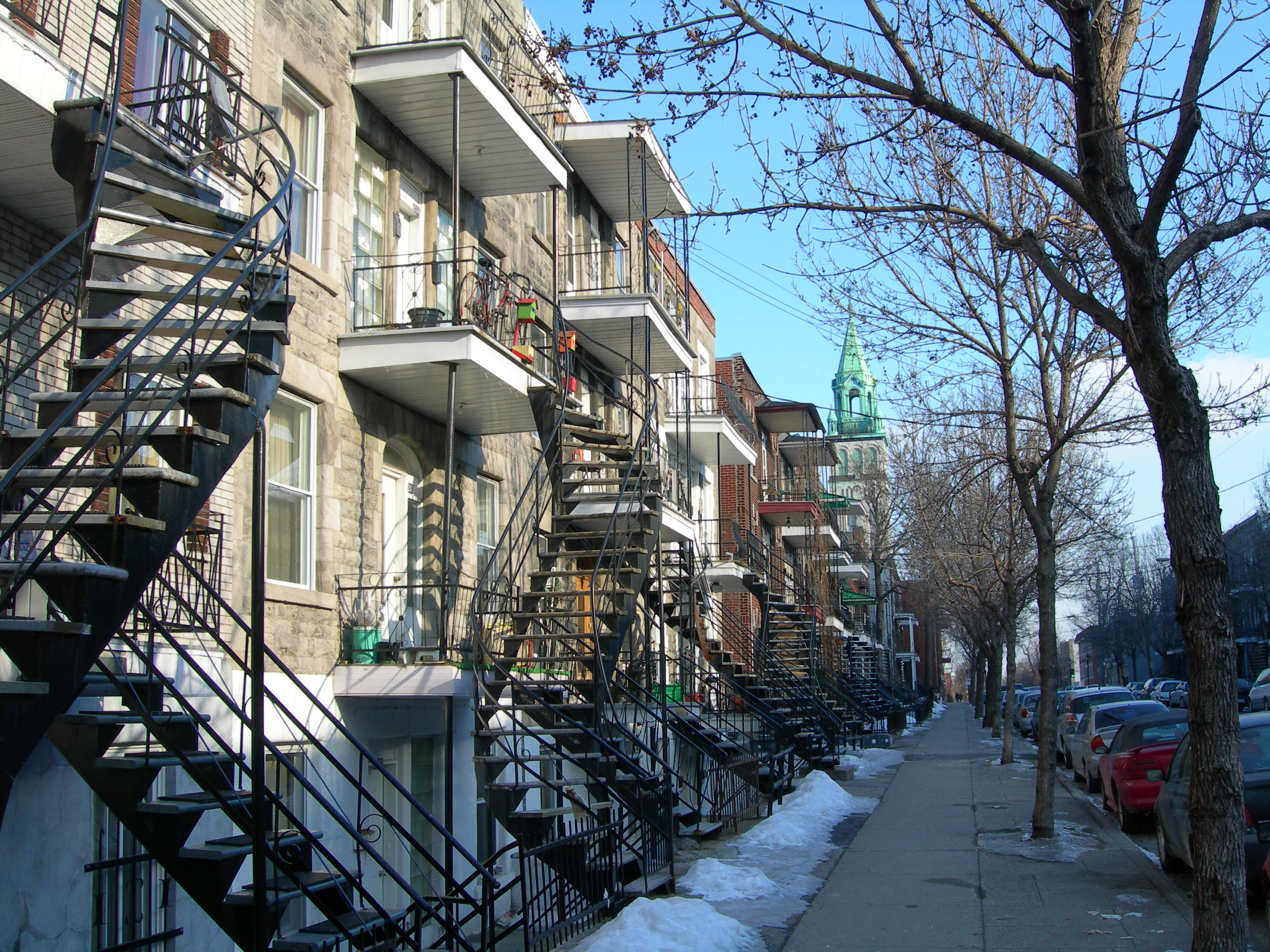
- Row houses on typical side street

- Nickname: HOMA
- Location of Hochelaga-Maisonneuve in Montreal
- Coordinates: 45.553°N 73.542°W
- Country: Canada
- Province: Quebec
- City: Montreal
- Borough: Mercier–Hochelaga-Maisonneuve
- Postal code(s): H1V, H1W
- Area codes: 514 and 438
- Website: https://montreal.ca/mercier-hochelaga-maisonneuve

Hochelaga-Maisonneuve (French pronunciation: [ɔʃlaɡa mɛzɔ̃nœv]) is a neighbourhood in Montreal, Canada, situated in the east end of the island, generally to the south of the city's Olympic Stadium and east of downtown.

Initially a 19th-century Anglophone settlement, Hochelaga-Maisonneuve transformed into a wealthy-Francophone industrial hub renowned for its Beaux-Arts architecture in the first half of the 20th-century. Following a decline triggered by post-1960s deindustrialization and highway construction, the working-class neighborhood transitioned toward a social economy. Today, Hochelaga-Maisonneuve is experiencing gentrification as its older, lower-income residents coexist with a younger, more affluent demographic.

== History ==
=== Early history ===
Hochelaga was named after the Iroquois village of the same name, first visited by explorer Jacques Cartier in 1534. The neighbourhood was at one time believed to be the location of the historic village, but modern historians and anthropologists have not reached agreement on the exact location.

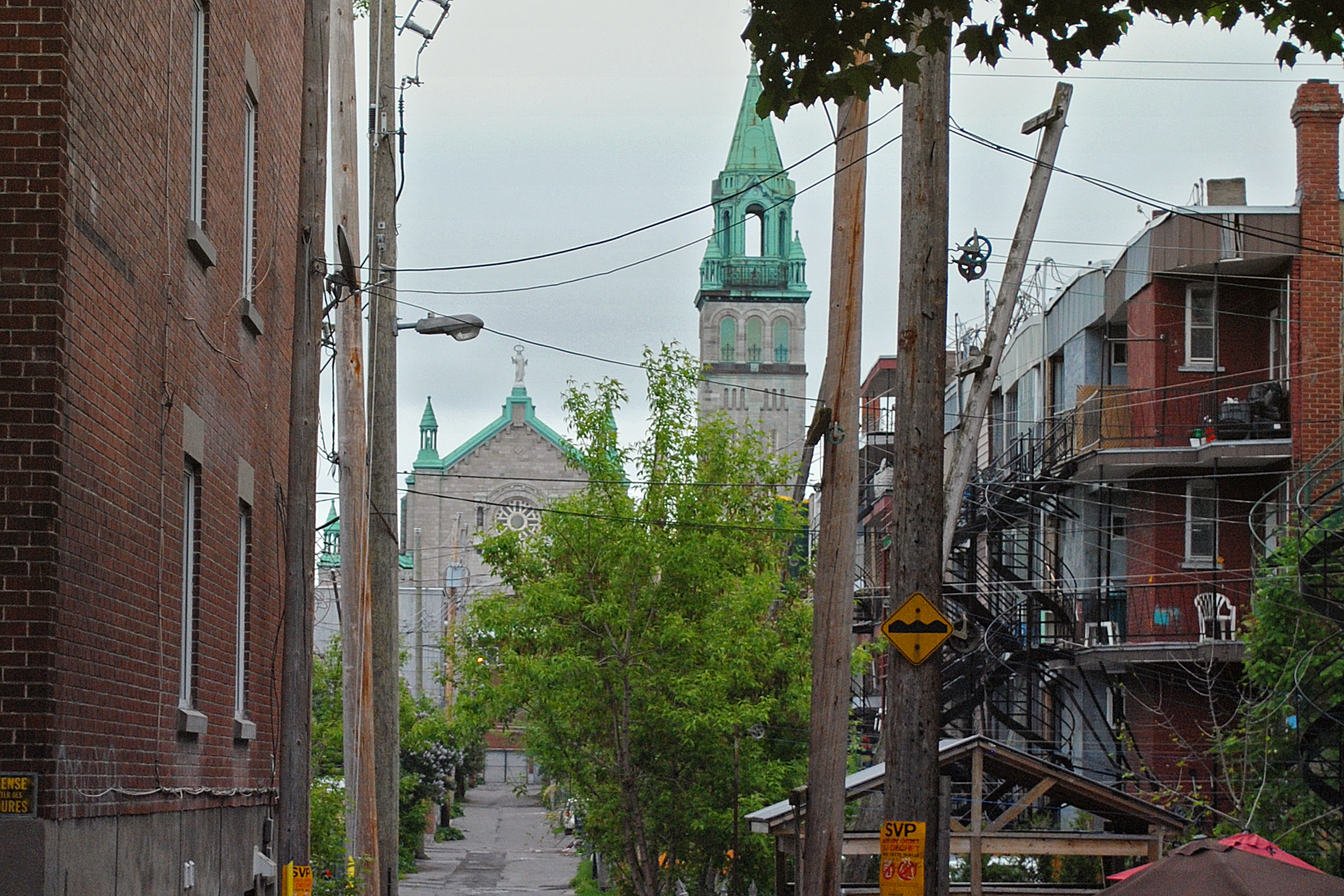
Unpaved side streets, or ruelles, are a common sight

Present-day Hochelaga was founded as a suburban village in 1863. Industry soon started moving in, including the Hudon and Sainte-Anne cotton mills and in 1876 the terminal and railway shops of the Quebec, Montreal, Ottawa and Occidental Railway.

=== Industrial Development ===
In 1883, Hochelaga was annexed to the city of Montreal against the demands of some of its landowners to the east. In response, they separated their territory to found the village of Maisonneuve.

Maisonneuve grew rapidly between 1896 and 1915 and became of one Canada's largest industrial suburbs, marketed as a model industrial city and the Pittsburgh of Canada during the first two decades of the 20th century These factories hired many workers, including immigrants and people from the surrounding countryside. They worked in the shoe, textile, tanning, slaughterhouse, tobacco, food, and shipbuilding industries.

=== Civic Projects & Beautification ===
The threat of annexation led the growing French bourgeoisie class in the town of Maisonneuve push to distinguish themselves,. Local councilors promoting government spending on 'civic beautification,' constructing the former Maisonneuve Town Hall (now Bibliothèque Maisonneuve), Maisonneuve Market, gymnasium and baths, and boulevards, including expansion of Pie-IX that established zoning in the area and barred factories and mill from being constructed,. The decision attracted wealthier French bourgeoisie class, which can be seen in the construction of Château Dufresne with its ornate design and decorated with stained glass from artisan Guido Nincheri. Nincheri would move his studio ontl Pie-IX boulevard in 1914.

In 1917, the town of Maisonneuve published an advertisement describing the town as the Garden of Montreal, a contradiction to its former industrial title. In 1910, there was the ambitious plan for Maisonneuve Park opened with to reinvigorate the declining real estate market, and remains one of the largest parks in Montreal, but it was fraught with scandals, being over budget and land speculation. Nonetheless, Maisonneuve Park succeeded with promoting cultural and athletic activities, and it continues to host the Montreal Botanical Garden beginning in 1930s, and later, the Maurice Richard Arena and Olympic stadium.

In 1918, the town of Maisonneuve was $18 million in debt. The combination of overambitious civic projects and scandals before the start of the World War I, Maisonneuve was forced to be annexed into Montreal, and consolidated into the neighbourhood as Hochelaga-Maisonneuve.

=== Decline ===
The construction of major transportation infrastructures such as Highway 25 in 1967, required the demolition of some 2,000 homes and institutional buildings. These changes, combined with the movement of capital and production to Toronto, hurt the neighbourhood's economy and vitality. Many factories left the area, along with numerous residents.

In 1976 the Olympic Stadium was opened, in time for the Summer Olympics.

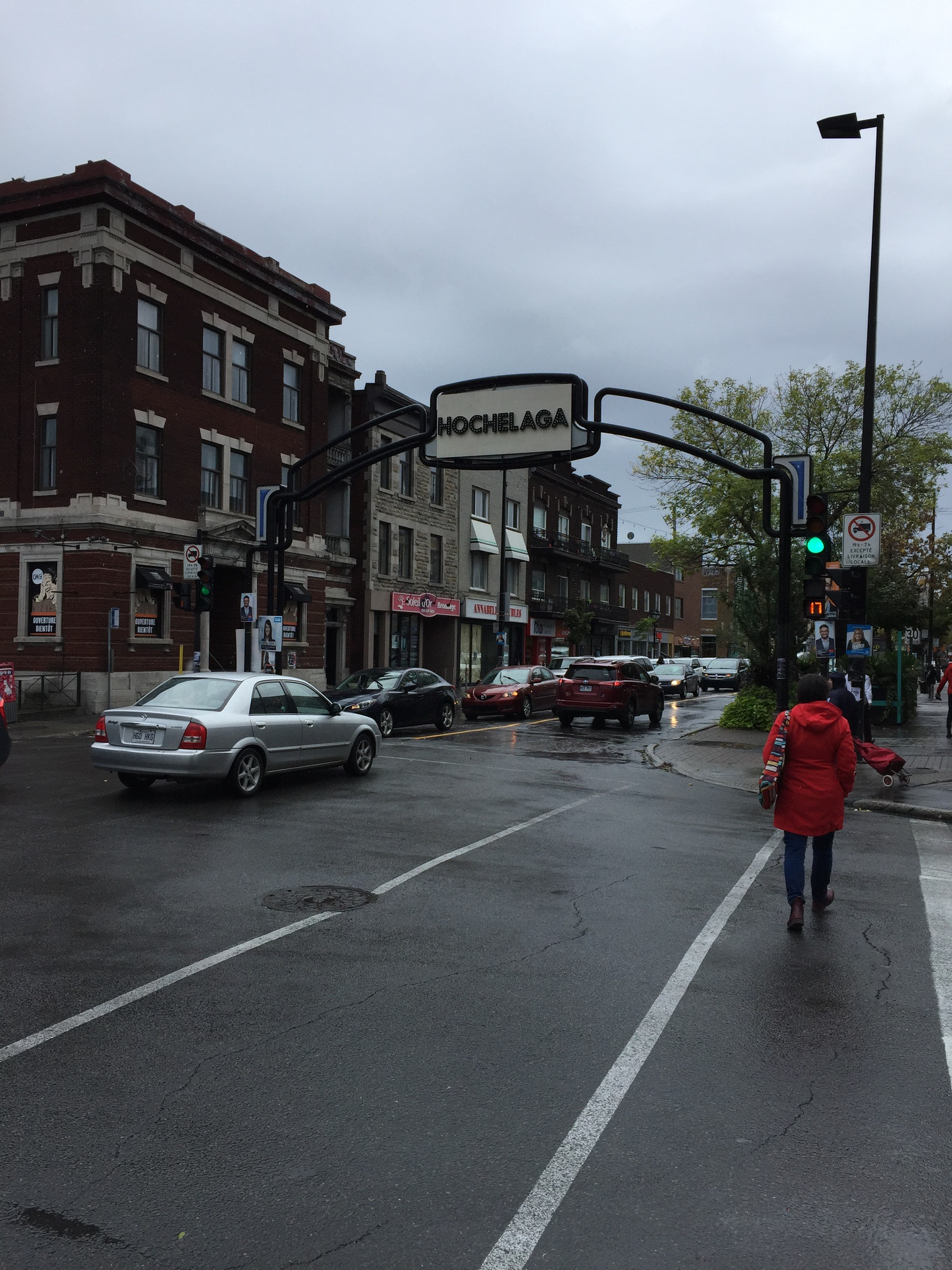
Promenade Ontario shopping area (developed c. 2020), corner Pie IX and Ontario

Beginning in the 1980s, factories started shutting down at an alarming rate, leaving the neighborhood ridden with poverty and a high concentration of welfare, especially in Hochelaga. This has led to a population exodus, relatively high crime rates, and a generally unfavorable view of the area.

The district became particularly notorious for prostitution, a contentious issue for many years.

During the Quebec Biker War, the Hells Angels had their clubhouse in Hochelaga-Maisonneuve, which worsened its reputation for criminality.

In the most notorious incident of the guerre des motards, on 9 August 1995, a drug dealer was killed by a bomb planted in his jeep while the shrapnel badly injured an 11-year boy, Daniel Desrochers, who died of his wounds four days later.

=== Present day ===
The 2010s were marked by increased gentrification, the arrival of students and professionals, and condo development leading to protests and some cases of vandalism of commerce. Notable areas that developed include the Promenade Ontario shopping street and the Place Simon Valois revitalized in 2017.

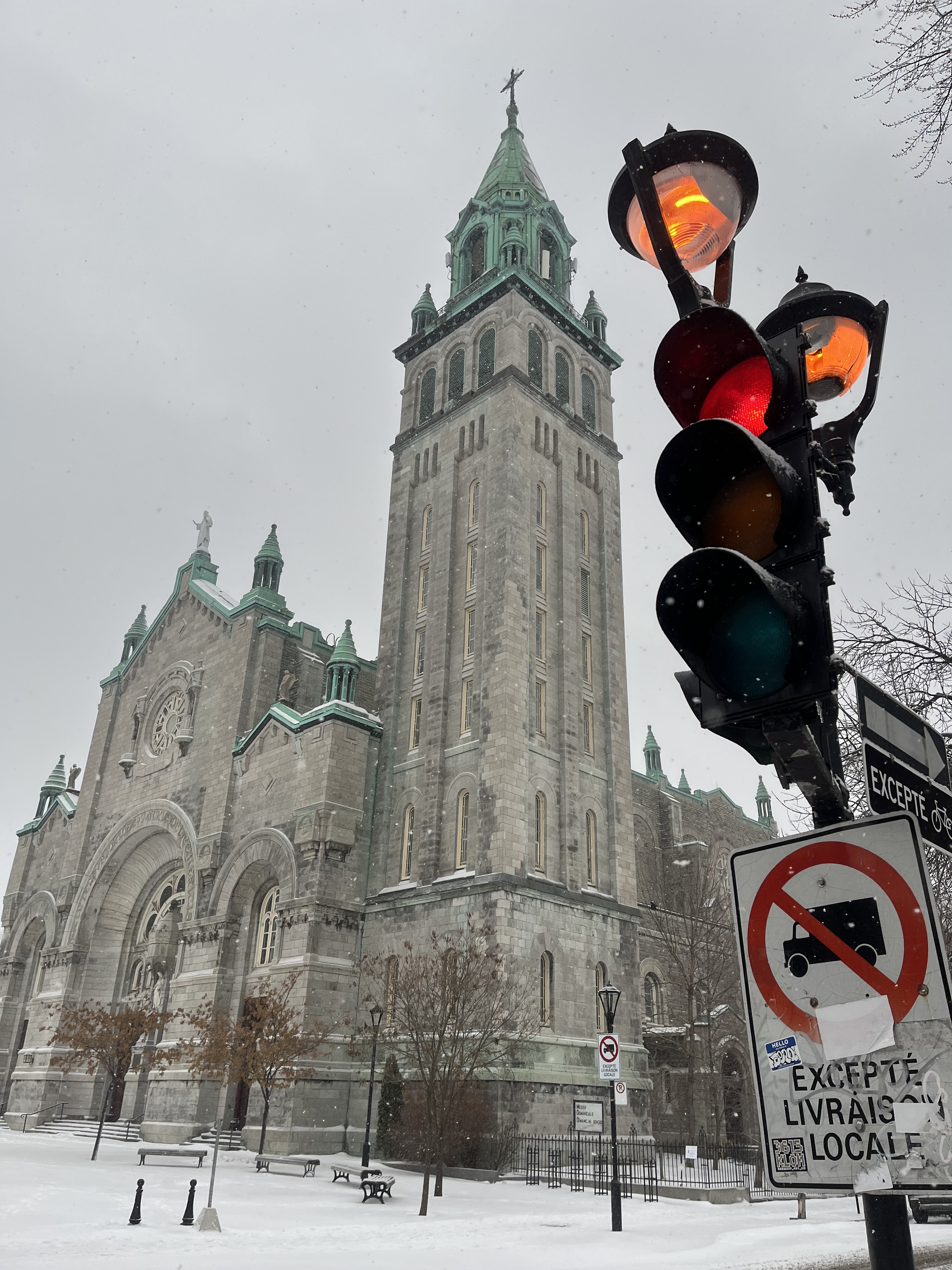
The Nativité-de-la-Sainte-Vierge Church on Ontario Street in the snow

Despite this, areas continue to struggle with poverty, prostitution and drug trafficking, particularly in the south-western corner of Hochelaga on Rue Sainte-Catherine Est.

In summer 2020, in the same area, a significant number of homeless people began camping along Rue Notre-Dame, creating something akin to a tent city. This was attributed in part to the ongoing housing crisis in Montreal, significantly heightened by unemployment due to the Covid-19 pandemic, as well as overcrowding of existing shelters.

In December 2020, the camp was shut down by the police, following a fire a few days earlier and hygiene concerns. This occurred despite promises from the mayor that they would not be forcibly relocated.

However, by the summer of 2022, many of the occupants had gradually returned, and were again removed by the SPVM in June, leading to an outcry from homeless advocates and certain opposition politicians.

== Features ==
A notable attraction is the Olympic Park, which contains the Stadium, Olympic Tower, Saputo Stadium, Biodome, Olympic Pool and Maurice Richard Arena. The Biodome was renovated between 2018 and 2020. It reopened to the public on August 31, 2020.

Part of Parc Maisonneuve is in the neighbourhood, as is the Marché Maisonneuve, one of the city's largest public markets.

Recent features to develop include Promenade Ontario, a shopping street that becomes pedestrian in the summer to host street fairs and street performers.

The revitalized Place Simon Valois, a public square on the corner of Ontario and Valois, is home to a variety of new commerces and attractions as well.

The borough operates the Hochelaga and Maisonneuve libraries.

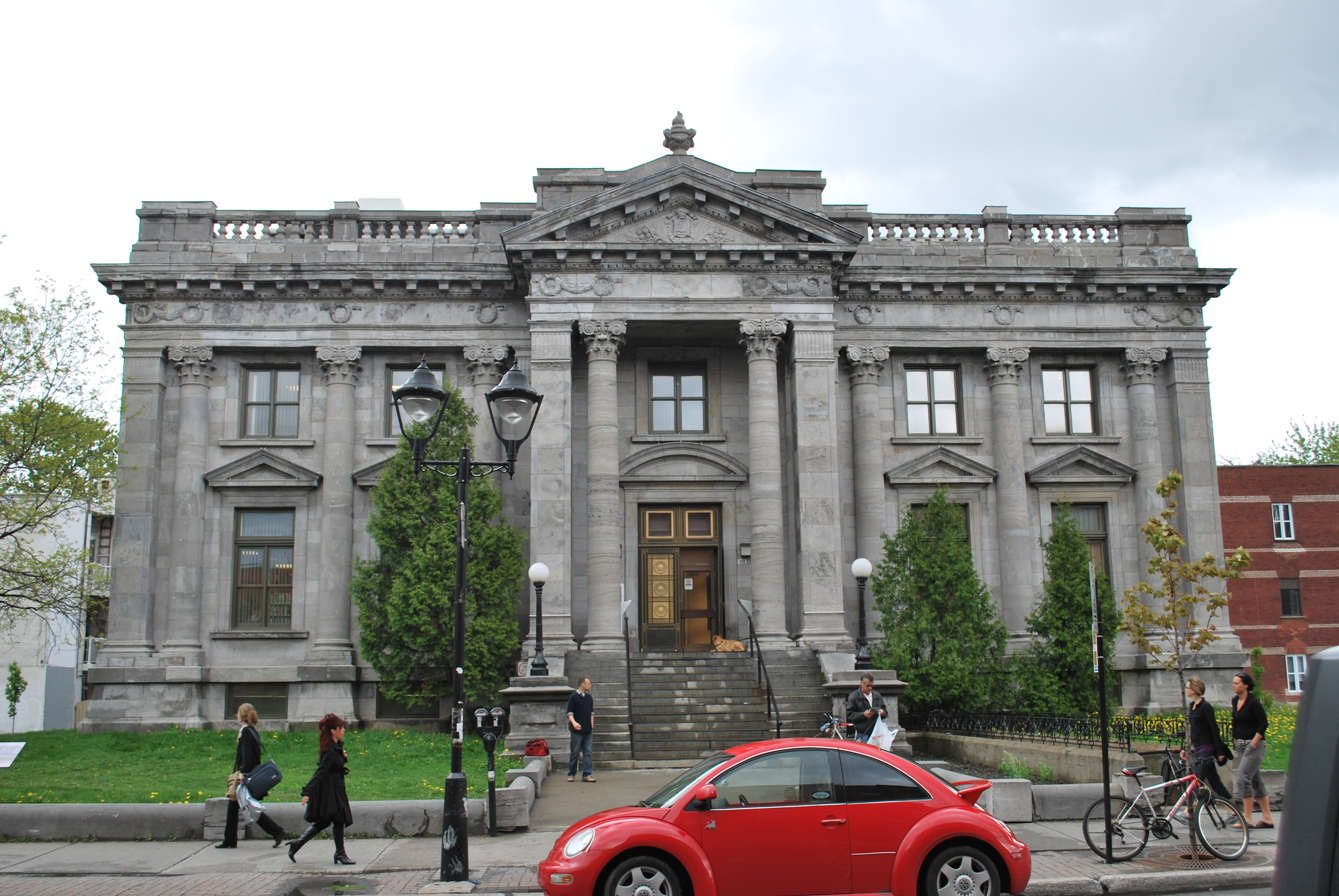
Maisonneuve library

== Geography ==
A part of the borough of Mercier–Hochelaga-Maisonneuve, its borders are roughly the CP rail line west of Rue Moreau to the west, Rue Sherbrooke to the north, the train tracks east of Rue Viau to the east, and the Saint Lawrence River to the south.

Boulevard Pie-IX is the traditional dividing point between Hochelaga and Maisonneuve.

It is bordered by Ville-Marie (Centre-Sud) to the west, Rosemont–La Petite-Patrie to the north, and Mercier to the east.

Its main commercial arteries running east to west are Rue Sainte-Catherine Est, Rue Ontario, Rue Hochelaga and Avenue Pierre de Coubertin.

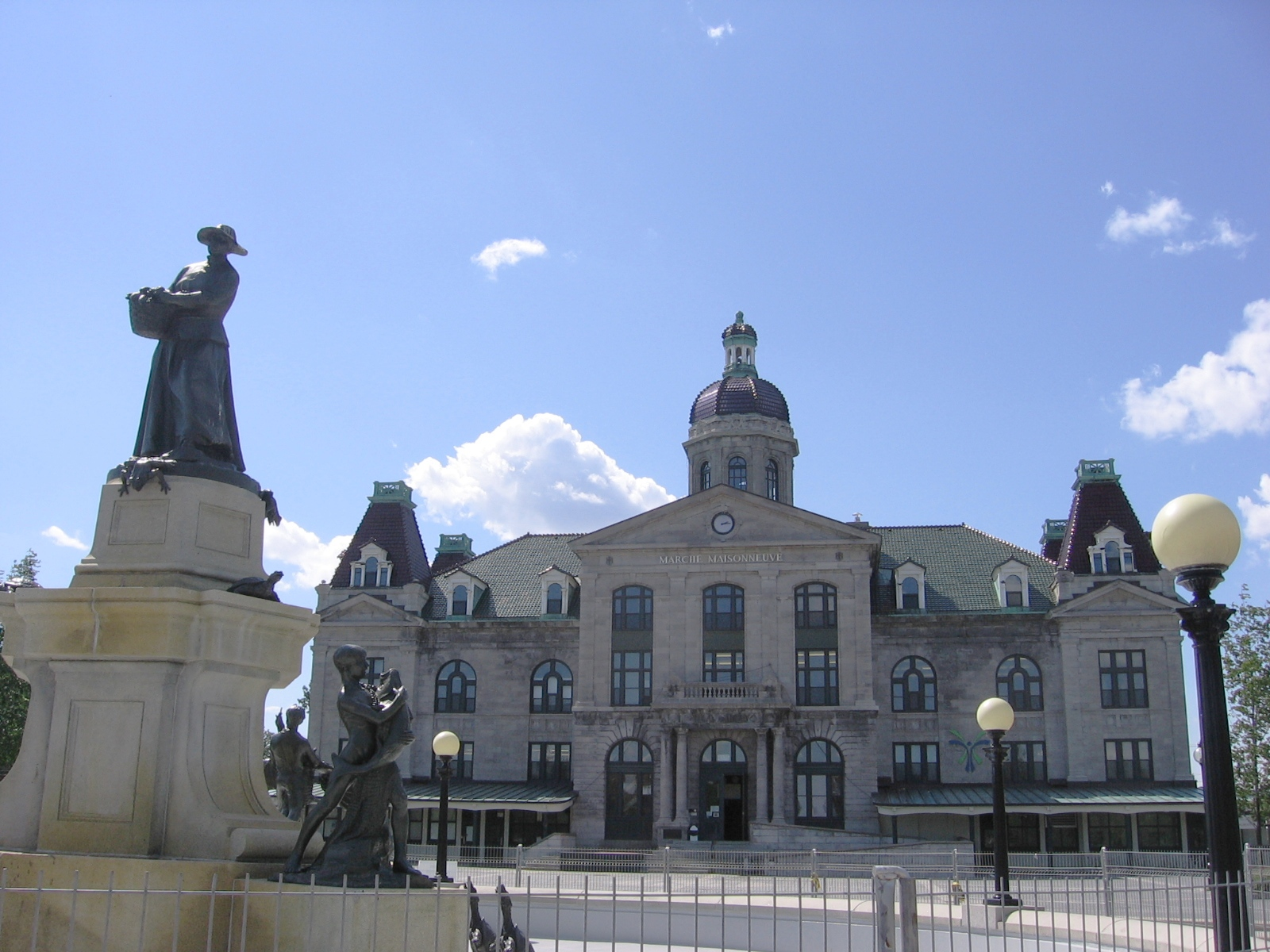
The Marché Maisonneuve

== Transportation ==
Hochelaga-Maisonneuve is served by the Préfontaine, Joliette, Pie-IX and Viau stations on the Green Line.

The following STM bus routes transit through the neighbourhood;

Société de transport de Montréal
No.	Route Name
34	Sainte-Catherine
85	Hochelaga
125	Ontario
136	Viau
139	Pie-IX
355 ☾	Pie-IX
362 ☾	Hochelaga/Notre-Dame
439	Express Pie-IX

== Popular culture ==
Hochelaga-Maisonneuve is prominently featured in Québécois culture and media.

Notable songs about the neighbourhood include Voyou by Les Cowboys Fringants, Hochelaga by Alexandre Poulin as well as La question à 100 piasses and Rue Ontario by Bernard Adamus.

The film Hochelaga directed by Michel Jetté and the documentary East End Forever are also about the neighbourhood.

== Politics ==
Hochelaga-Maisonneuve is located in the federal riding of Hochelaga, and represented by MP Marie-Gabrielle Ménard of the Liberal Party.

Provincially it's located in the riding of the same name, and represented by MNA Alexandre Leduc of Québec Solidaire.

Municipally it's part of Hochelaga and Maisonneuve–Longue-Pointe, represented by Éric Alan Caldwell and Laurence Lavigne-Lalonde of Projet Montréal at the Montreal City Council.

== Notable people ==
- Pierre Falardeau, film director, activist for Quebec independence
- Julien Poulin, film director and actor
- Bernard Adamus, singer-songwriter
- Robert Guy Scully, journalist, English-rights activist
- Maurice Boucher, outlaw biker, former Hells Angels president

== Education ==
The Commission scolaire de Montréal (CSDM) operates French-language public schools.

=== Elementary ===
- École Baril
- École Notre-Dame-de-L'Assomption
- École Maisonneuve
- École Saint-Clément
- École Saint-Jean-Baptiste-de-Lasalle

=== High school ===
- École Sécondaire Chomedey-De Maisonneuve

=== Specialized ===
- École des Métiers de la Construction de Montréal
- École pour Adultes Centre Hochelaga-Maisonneuve
- École Eulalie-Durocher (for intellectually disabled)

The English Montreal School Board (EMSB) operates English-language schools.

==== Elementary ====
- Edward Murphy Elementary School (in nearby Mercier)

==== High school ====
(for high school, students must go to nearby Vincent Massey Collegiate in Rosemont or F.A.C.E. School downtown)

== See also ==
- Centre-Sud, nearby neighbourhood with similar background and history
- Hochelaga, federal electoral district
- Hochelaga-Maisonneuve, provincial electoral district
