= Mercier–Hochelaga-Maisonneuve =

Coordinates: 45°34′03″N 73°31′32″W

- Borough of Montreal
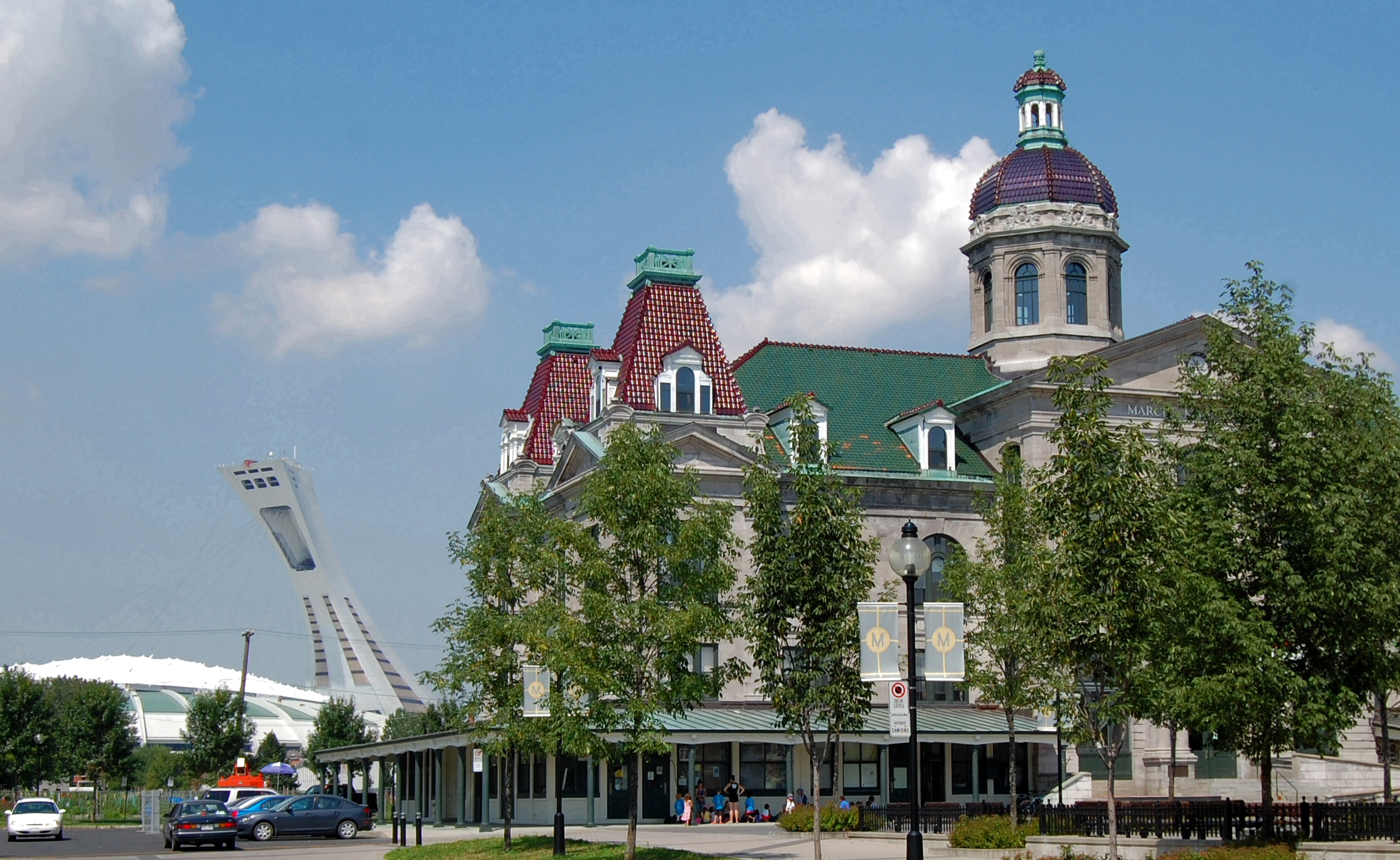
- Marché Maisonneuve, a major farmer's market, with the statue La Fermière by Alfred Laliberté in the foreground and the Olympic Stadium in the background.

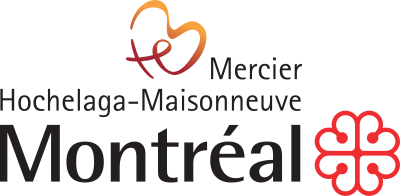

- Map of the island of Montreal, with Mercier–Hochelaga-Maisonneuve in red.
- Country: Canada
- Province: Quebec
- City: Montreal
- Electoral Districts Federal: Hochelaga; La Pointe-de-l'Île; Honoré-Mercier
- Provincial: Hochelaga-Maisonneuve; Camille-Laurin; Anjou–Louis-Riel

Government
  - Borough Mayor: Pierre Lessard-Blais (PM)
  - Federal MP(s): Soraya Martinez Ferrada (LPC); Mario Beaulieu (BQ); Pablo Rodríguez (LPC)
  - Quebec MNA(s): Alexandre Leduc (QS); Paul St-Pierre Plamondon (PQ); Karine Boivin Roy (CAQ)

Area
  - Total: 25.4 km^{2} (9.8 sq mi)

Population (2021)
  - Total: 140,627
  - Density: 5,536.5/km^{2} (14,339/sq mi)
  - Dwellings: 66,950
- Time zone: UTC-5 (EST)
  - Summer (DST): UTC-4 (EDT)
- Postal code(s): H1L, H1M, H1N, H1V, H1W
- Area codes: (514) and (438)
- Website: https://montreal.ca/mercier-hochelaga-maisonneuve

Mercier–Hochelaga-Maisonneuve (French pronunciation: [mɛʁsje ɔʃlaɡa mɛzɔ̃nœv]) is a borough of Montreal, Quebec, Canada located in the southeastern end of the island.

== History ==
See Mercier and Hochelaga-Maisonneuve articles for a more detailed histories of respective areas

Hochelaga was founded as a village in 1870, and annexed to Montreal in 1883. In response, dissatisfied landowners founded the village of Maisonneuve to the east.

Maisonneuve grew rapidly and became known as the Pittsburgh of Canada for its heavy industry, before finally being annexed to Montreal in 1918.

These factories hired many workers, including immigrants and people from the surrounding countryside. They worked in the shoe, textile, tanning, slaughterhouse, tobacco, food, and shipbuilding industries.

In 1920, many factories closed and moved east to Mercier. Mercier was an agglomeration of old villages: Beau-Rivage, Longue-Pointe and Tétreaultville. It was previously annexed to Montreal in 1910, before Maisonneuve.

In 1960, the construction of the Autoroute 25 saw the demolition of many residential buildings in Mercier and divided it into two districts: Mercier-Ouest and Mercier-Est.

Starting in the 1980s, Hochelaga-Maisonneuve suffered significant economic and social decline, gaining a bad reputation for poverty, unemployment and organized crime.

In recent years, Hochelaga-Maisonneuve, and to a much lesser extent Mercier, has experienced significant change and gentrification.

== Geography ==
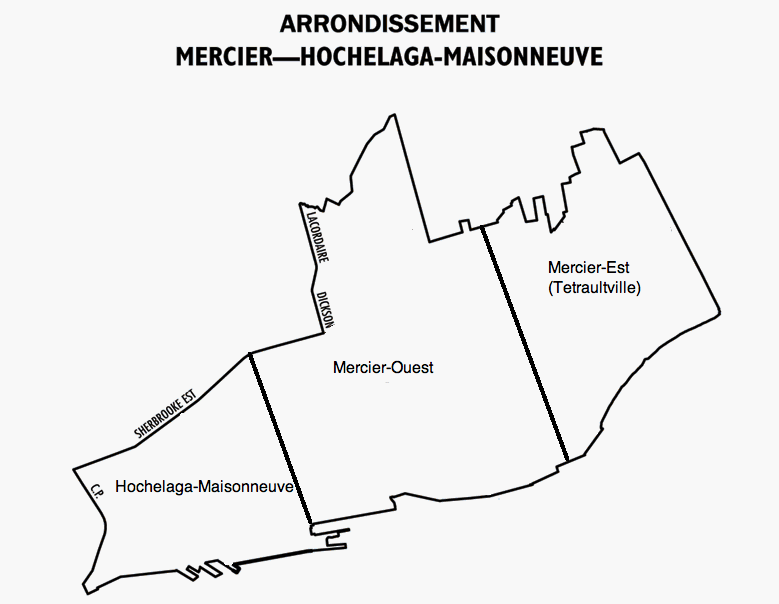
The three regions of the borough.

Located in the east end of the Island of Montreal, it was part of the City of Montreal prior to the 2002 municipal mergers. It is composed of the Hochelaga-Maisonneuve, Mercier-Ouest (Longue-Pointe) and Mercier-Est (Tétraultville) areas. Each area has roughly the same population, but they differ in their commercial and social characteristics.

The largely oblong borough is bordered to the west by Ville-Marie (Centre-Sud), northwest by the borough of Rosemont—La Petite-Patrie, on the northeast by Saint Leonard and Anjou, and to the east by Montréal-Est. To the south is the Saint Lawrence River.

Its main arteries running east to west are Rue Notre-Dame, Rue Sainte-Catherine Est, Rue Ontario, Rue Hochelaga, Avenue Pierre De Coubertin and Rue Sherbrooke.

It has an area of 25,4 km^{2} and the evolution of industry and transportation has profoundly transformed the borough.

== Demographics ==
Source: ^{,}

Historical populations
Year	Pop.	±%
1966	185,172	—
1971	179,085	−3.3%
1976	154,921	−13.5%
1981	141,571	−8.6%
1986	137,722	−2.7%
1991	130,589	−5.2%
1996	125,519	−3.9%
2001	128,463	+2.3%
2006	129,110	+0.5%
2011	131,483	+1.8%
2016	136,024	+3.5%
2021	140,627	+3.4%

Home language (2016)
Language	Population	Percentage (%)
French	105,885	85%
English	6,285	5%
Other languages	12,830	10%

Mother tongue (2016)
Language	Population	Percentage (%)
French	99,650	78%
English	4,400	4%
Other languages	24,645	19%

Visible Minorities (2016)
Ethnicity	Population	Percentage (%)
Not a visible minority	103,240	78.4%
Visible minorities	28,470	21.6%

== Employment ==
The borough is often cast in a negative light, mainly due to its economic planning and high poverty rate. However, it is often neglected to mention that the borough, despite a descriptive accent on its poverty, has large industrial zones and is commercially dynamic. It is often considered 'up and coming' with new revitalization plans for its residential zones.

According to 'Recensement des établissements et de l'emploi à Montréal (REEM 2000)' there's been an increase of 95% in professional and technical jobs in the borough. However, this can be attributed to gentrification in the area, specifically in the Hochelaga district.

The average family income in Mercier-Hochelaga-Maisonneuve is $48,544 and personal income of $29,919 are considerably below the Montreal average. Nearly 19% of the borough's population is considered low-income, and there are patches of poverty scattered throughout the borough and heavily concentrated in the Hochelaga-Maisonneuve district.

== Government ==
=== Borough council ===
District	Position	Name	Party
—	Borough mayor City councillor	Pierre Lessard-Blais	Projet Montréal
Hochelaga	City councillor	Éric Alan Caldwell	Projet Montréal
Louis-Riel	City councillor	Alba Zuñiga Ramos	Ensemble Montréal
Maisonneuve–Longue-Pointe	City councillor	Alia Hassan-Cournol	Projet Montréal
Tétreaultville	City councillor	Julien Hénault-Ratelle	Ensemble Montréal

=== Federal and provincial ===
The borough is divided among the following federal ridings:

- Hochelaga
- Honoré-Mercier
- La Pointe-de-l'Île

It is divided among the following provincial electoral districts:

- Hochelaga-Maisonneuve
- Camille-Laurin
- Anjou–Louis-Riel

== Features ==
The borough is bisected by Autoroute 25 and contains the Montreal entrance to the Louis Hippolyte Lafontaine Tunnel. It is served by the eastern end of the green line of the Montreal metro; the Honoré-Beaugrand and Radisson stations are connected to important bus termini.

Attractions in the area include the Olympic Stadium, Saputo Stadium and Montreal Biodome, the Montreal Botanical Garden, the Château Dufresne, Collège de Maisonneuve, the Marché Maisonneuve, the Théâtre Denise-Pelletier, the Hôpital Maisonneuve-Rosemont, and the Place Versailles shopping centre located at the intersection of Rue Sherbrooke Est and Autoroute 25.

The Canadian Armed Forces also have a base, CFB Montreal, in the east of the borough.

The borough is home to the Church of Nativité-de-la-Sainte-Vierge-d'Hochelaga.

The Montreal Public Libraries Network operates the Hochelaga, Langelier, Maisonneuve, and Mercier libraries.

== Education ==
The borough has one French language cégep, College de Maisonneuve.

The Commission scolaire de Montréal (CSDM) operates French-language public schools.

=== Elementary ===
- École Baril
- École Notre-Dame-de-L'Assomption
- École Maisonneuve
- École Saint-Clément
- École Saint-Jean-Baptiste-de-Lasalle
- École Notre-Dame-des-Victoires
- École Saint-Nom-de-Jésus
- École Louis Dupire
- École Saint-Fabien
- École Saint-Donat
- École Boucher-De La Bruère
- École Sainte-Louise-de-Marillac
- École Sainte-Claire
- École Saint-François-d'Assise
- École Saint-Justin
- École La Vérendrye
- École Irénée-Lussier
- École Armand-Lavergne
- École Philippe-Labarre

=== High school ===
- École Sécondaire Chomedey-De Maisonneuve
- École Sécondaire Marguerite-De Lajemmerais
- École Secondaire Édouard-Montpetit
- École Secondaire Académie Dunton
- École Sécondaire Louise-Trichet

=== Specialized ===
- École des Métiers de la Construction de Montréal
- École des Métiers de l'aérospatiale de Montréal
- École pour Adultes Centre Hochelaga-Maisonneuve
- École Eulalie-Durocher (for intellectually disabled)
- École de la Lancée (for boys with behavioural problems and in foster care)

The English Montreal School Board (EMSB) operates English-language schools.

==== Elementary ====
- Edward Murphy Elementary School

==== High school ====
(for high school, students must go to nearby Vincent Massey Collegiate in Rosemont)

== Gallery ==
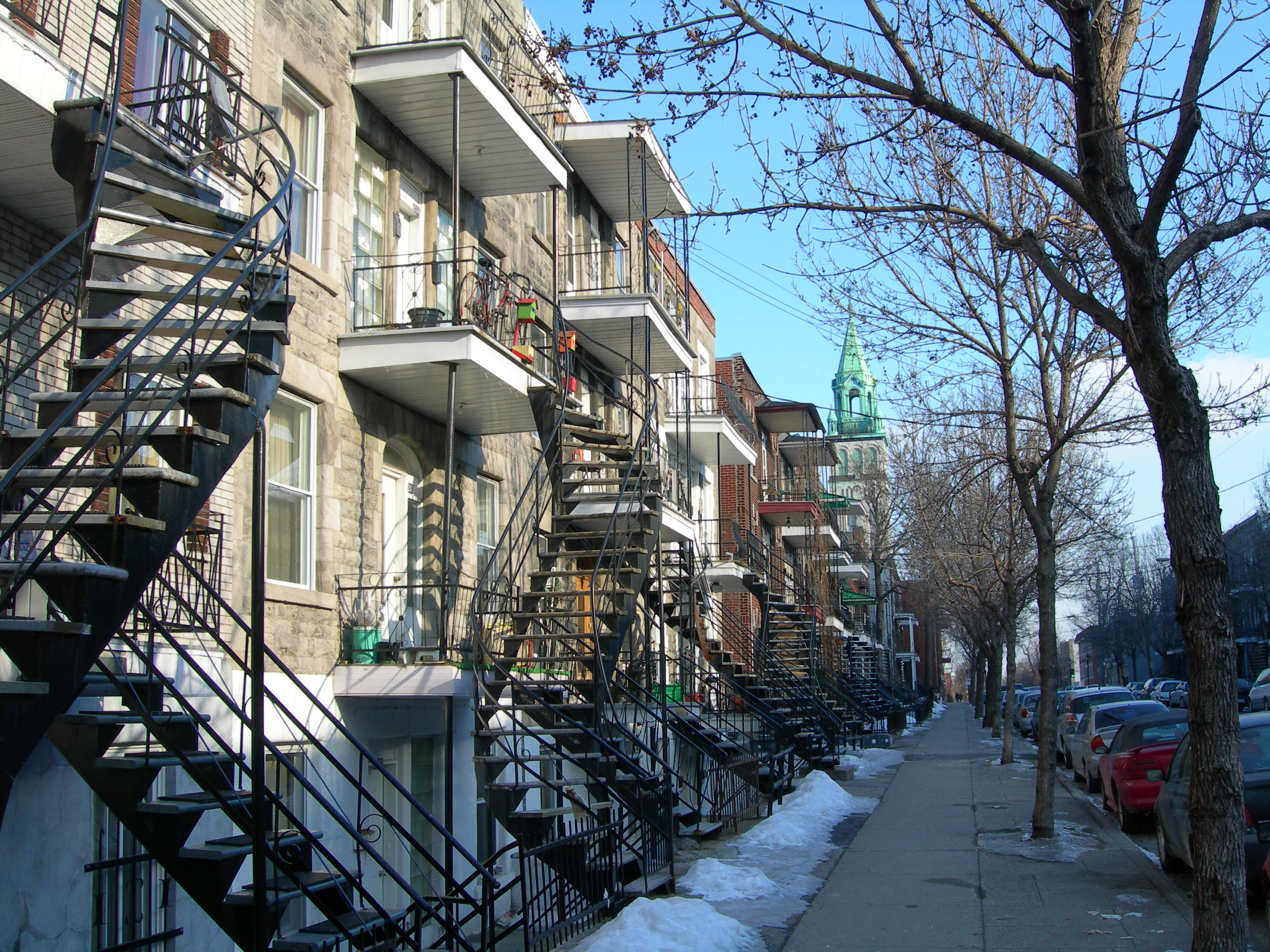
Rowhouses in Hochelaga-Maisonneuve

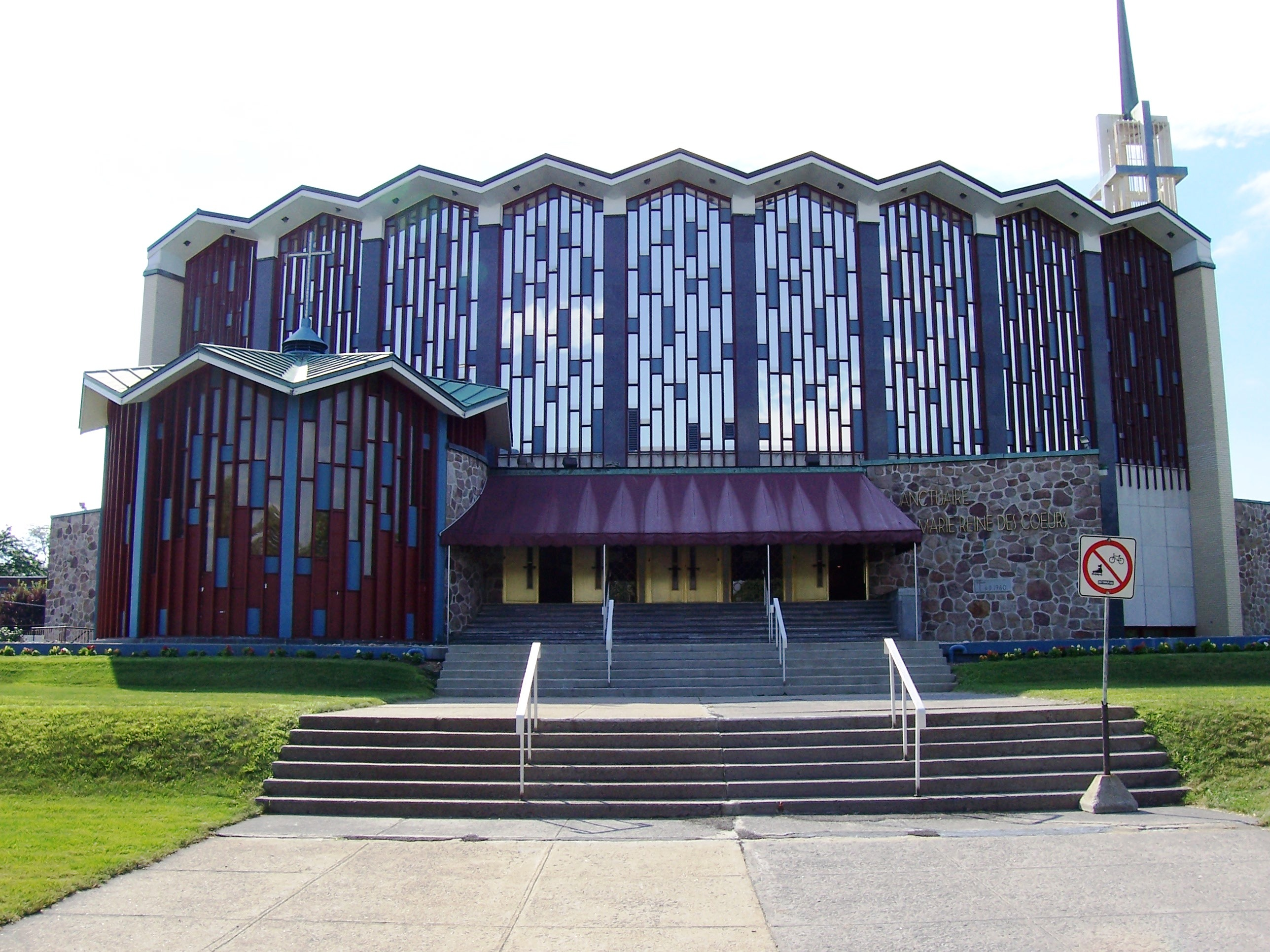
Sanctuaire Marie-Reine-des-Coeurs

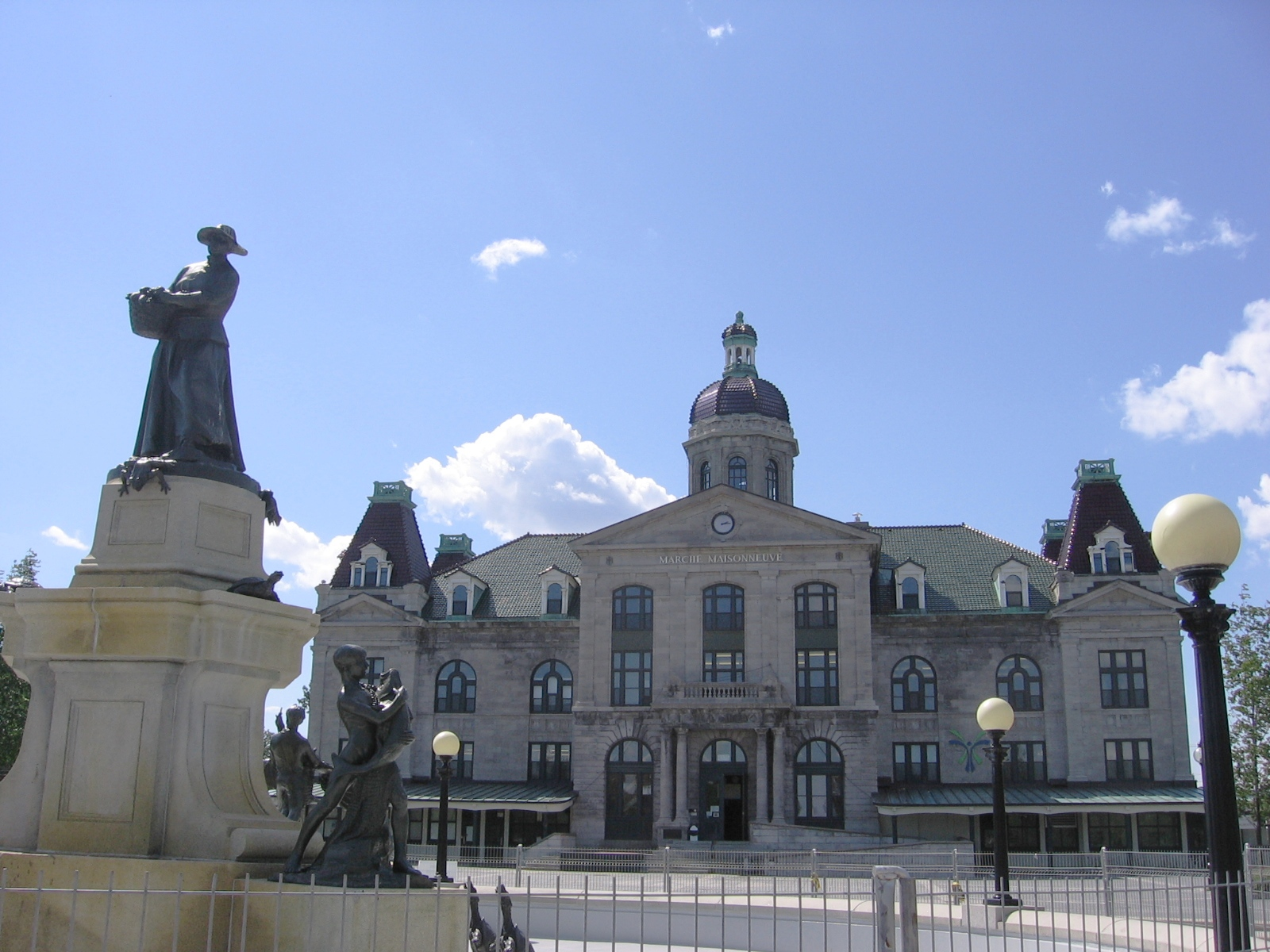
The Marché Maisonneuve

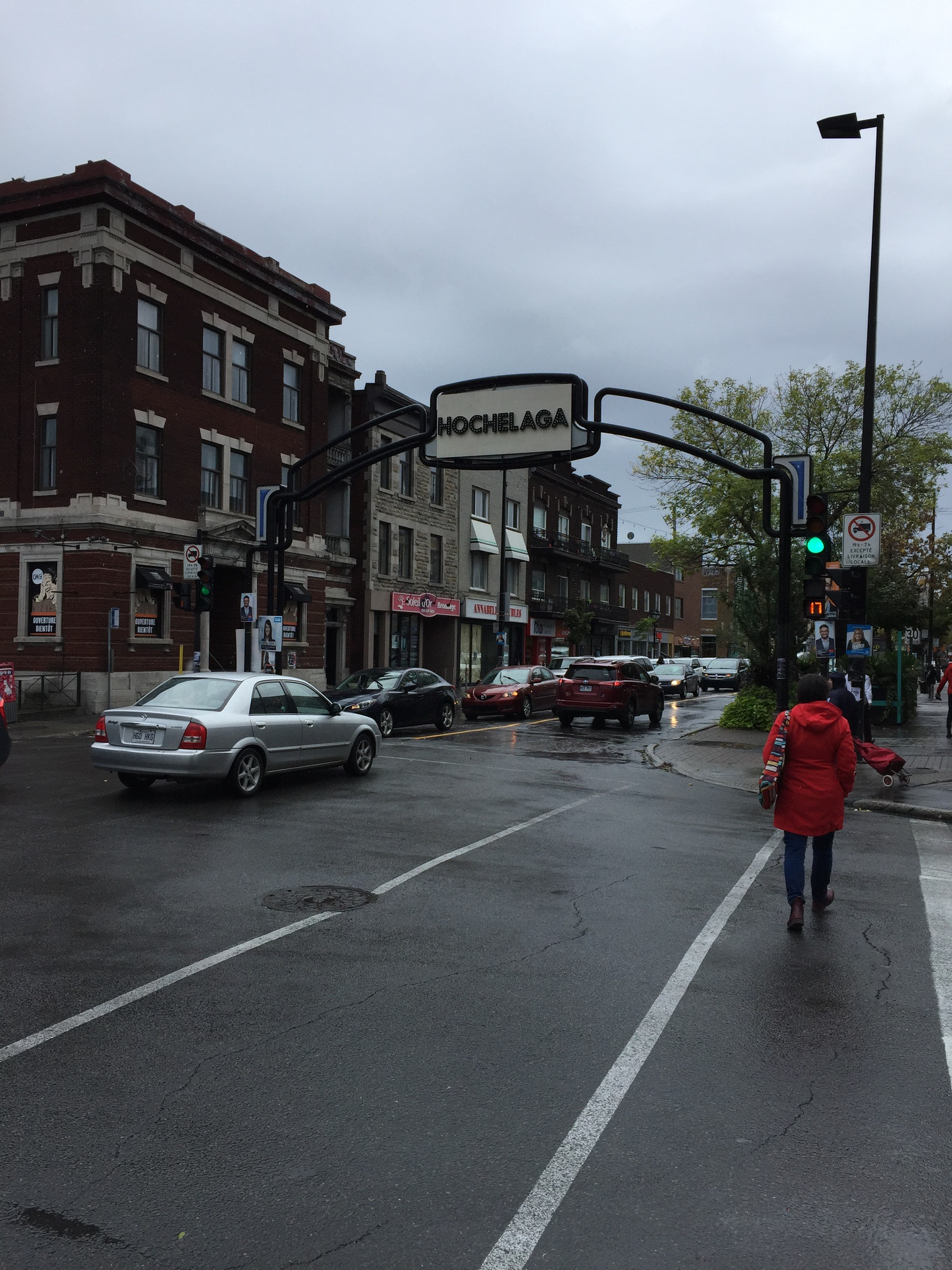
Promenade Ontario, corner of Pie-IX and Ontario

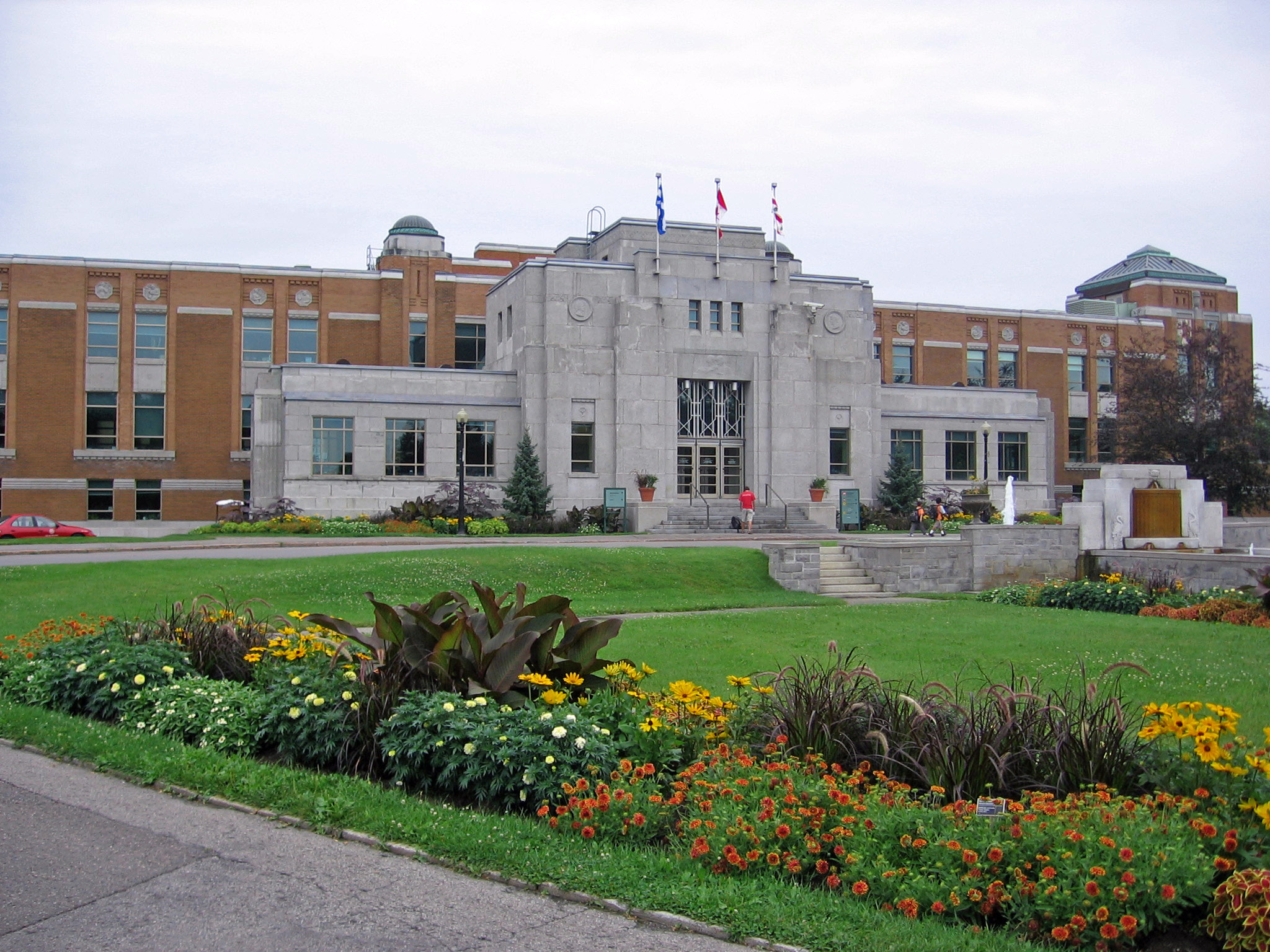
The Botanical Gardens

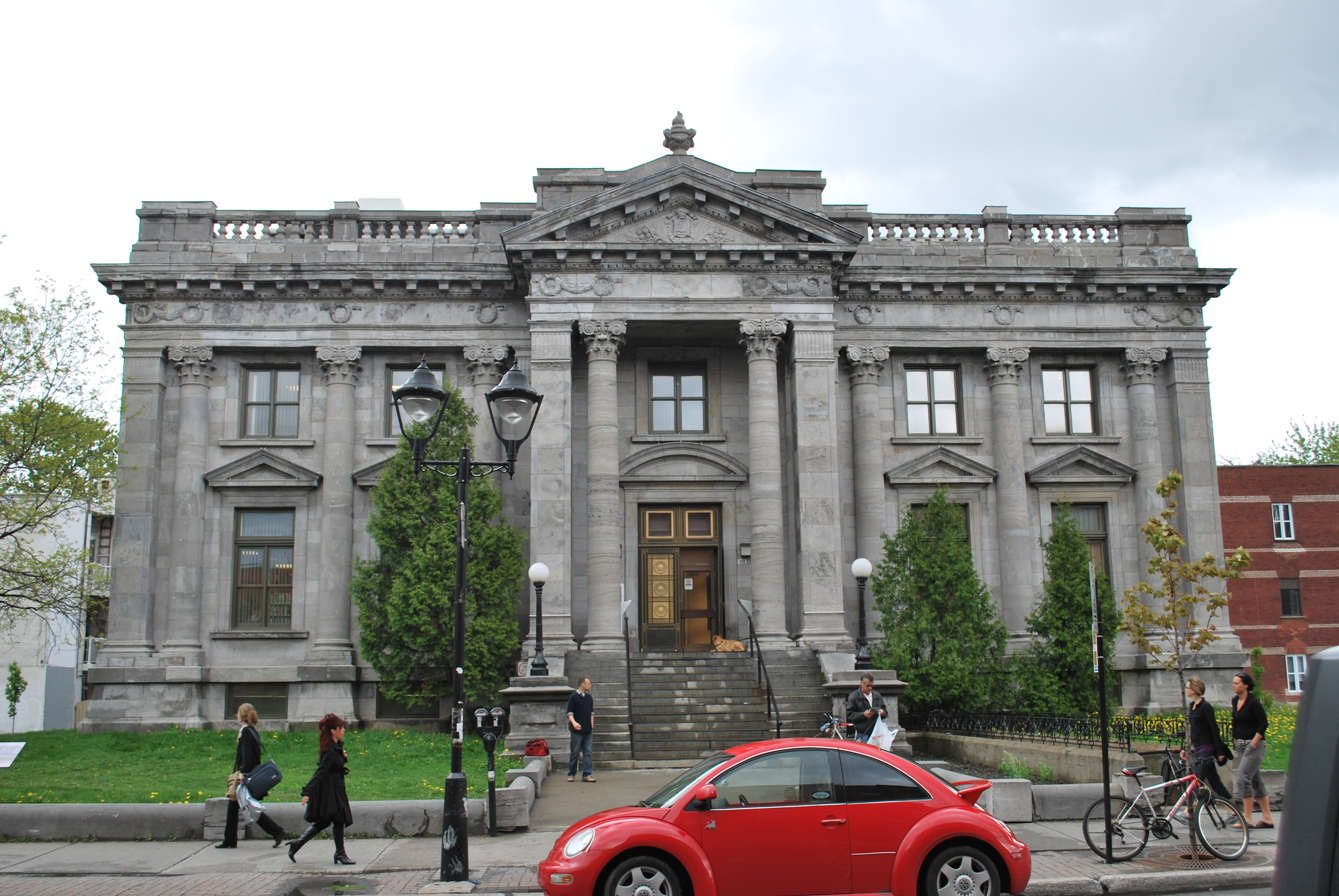
The Maisonneuve library

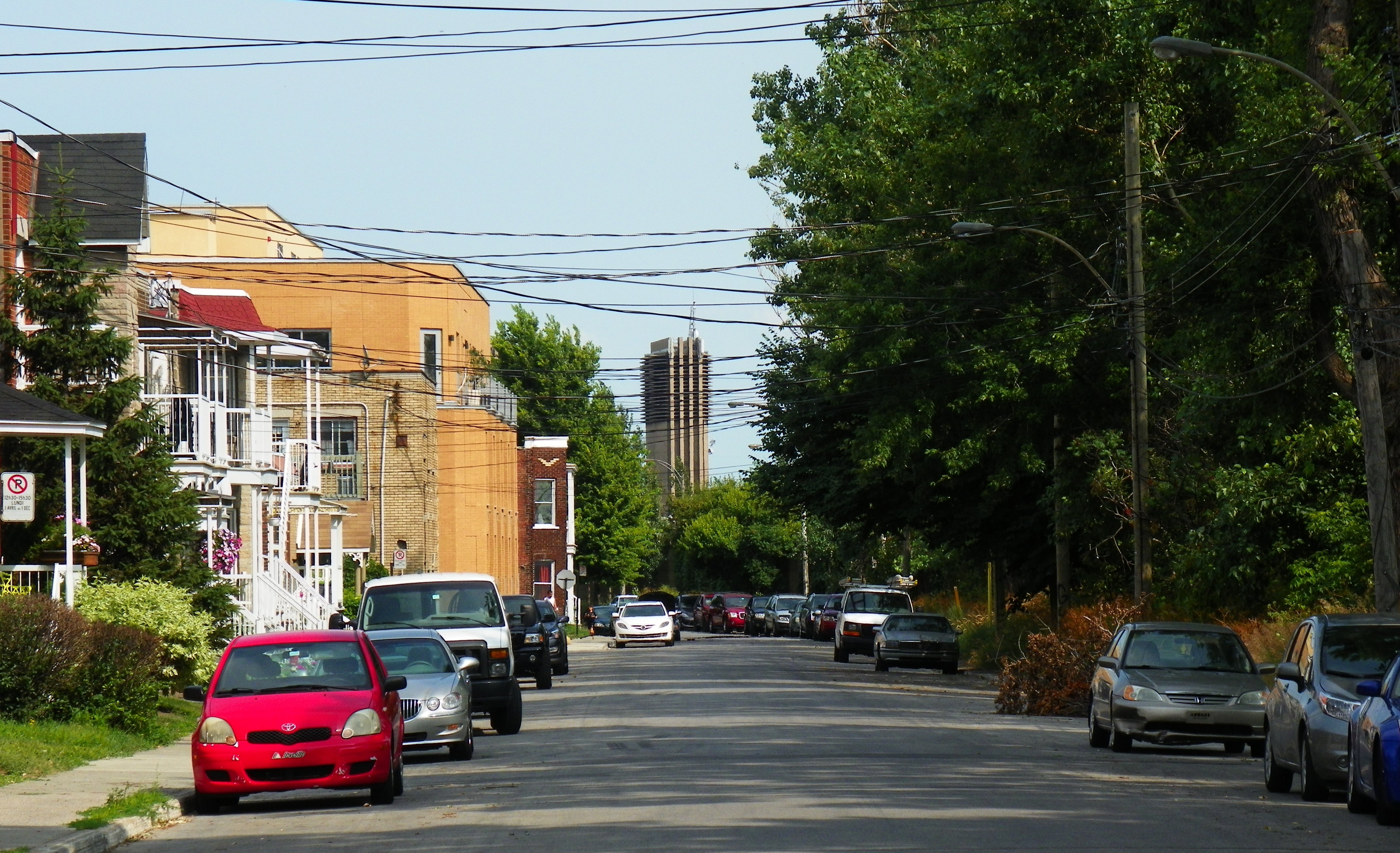
A suburban area of Tétraultville

== See also ==
- Boroughs of Montreal
- Districts of Montreal
- Municipal reorganization in Quebec
