= Louise Mauger =

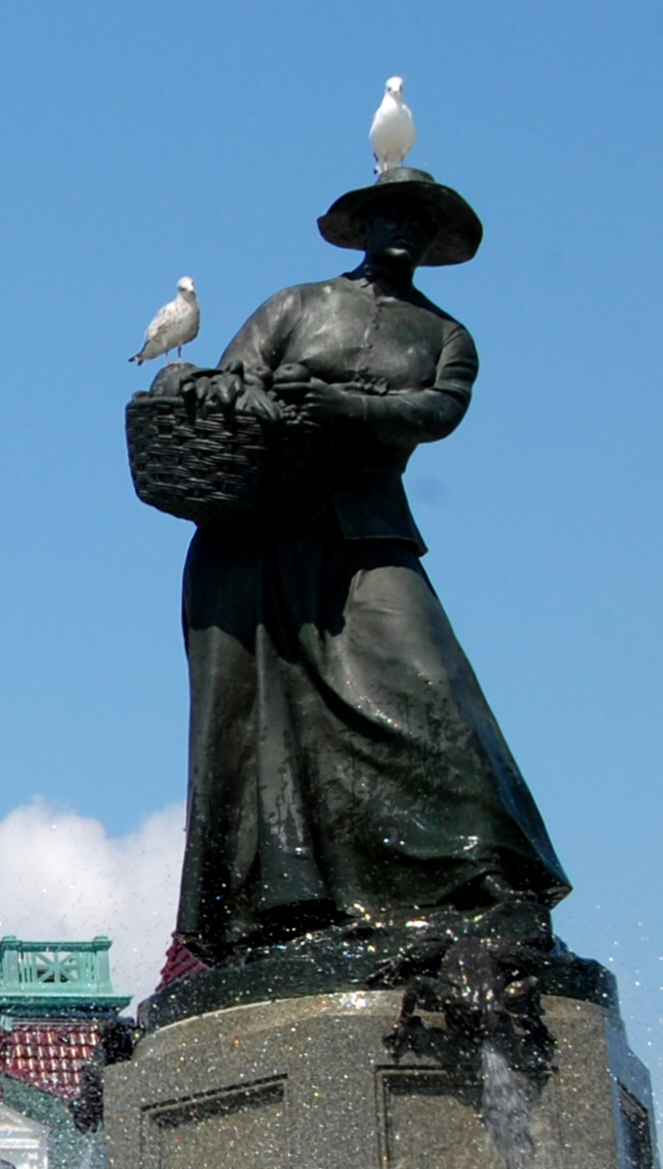
- Her statue at Maisonneuve Market
- Born: 1598; St-Martin d'Igé, ev. Sees, Perche, France
- Died: 1690 (aged 91–92); Montreal
- Occupation: farmer
- Spouse: Pierre Gadoys
- Children: Roberte (1621–1716); Pierre (1632–1714); Jean-Baptiste (1641–1728)

Louise Mauger (1598 – March 1690) was one of the pioneers in the French colonial settlement of Montreal in North America.

Mauger was born abt 1598 in St-Martin d'Igé, ev. Sees, Perche, France and married to Pierre Gadoys (1594–1667) before September 15, 1628 in France. Three of their children are known: Roberte (1621–1716) who in 1650 married the pioneer Louis Prud’homme: Pierre (1632–1714), born in France, died at Montreal; and Jean-Baptiste (1641–1728) born at Quebec City, died at Montreal; both the sons were gunsmiths. Their descendants have survived to the present day. Louise Mauger was buried on March 18, 1690 in Montreal.

Without naming her, the Fermière Monument in Montreal is an homage to Louise Mauger. She is depicted as a market gardener of the 17th century.

== Gallery ==
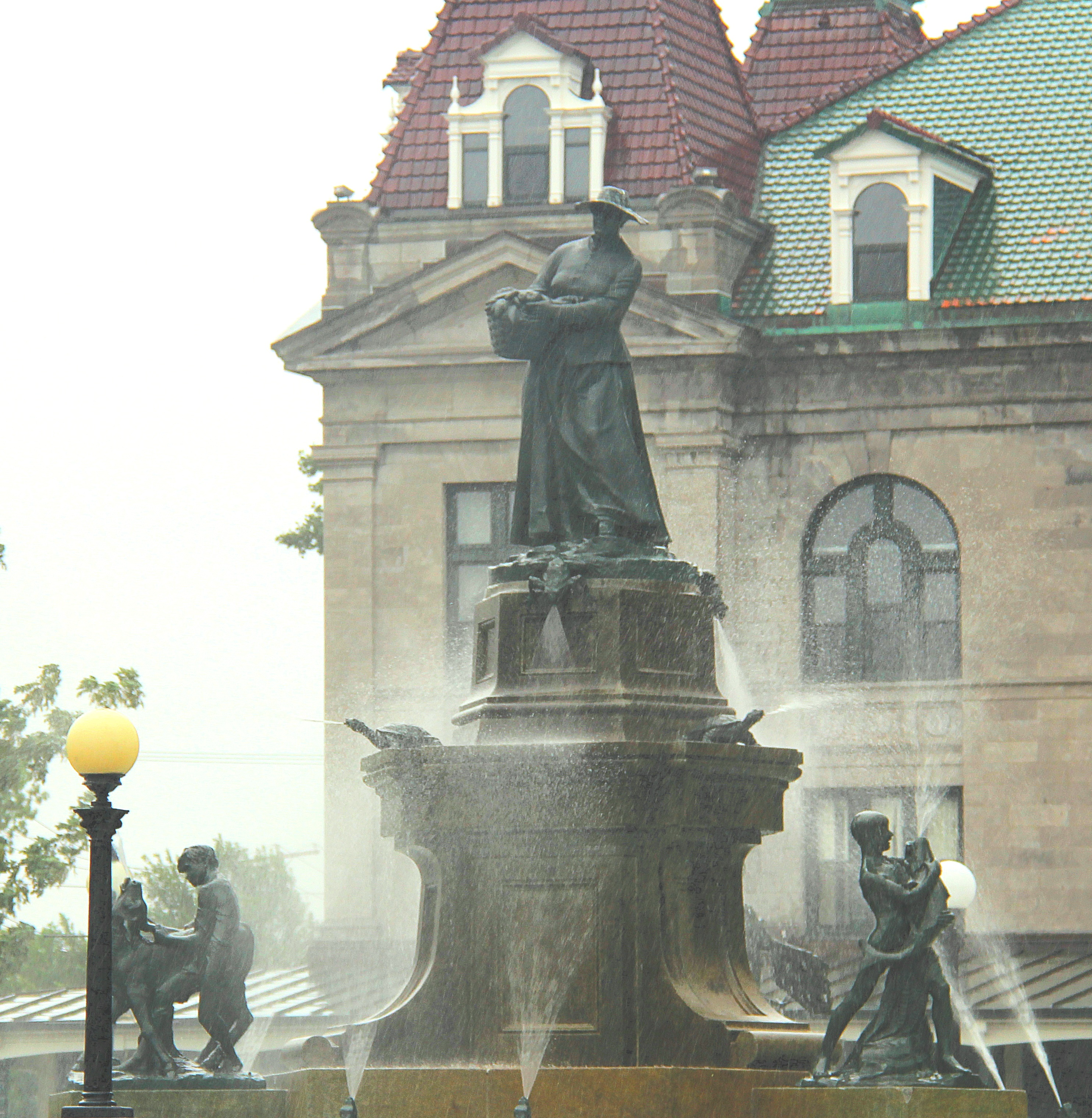
La Fermière by Alfred Laliberté

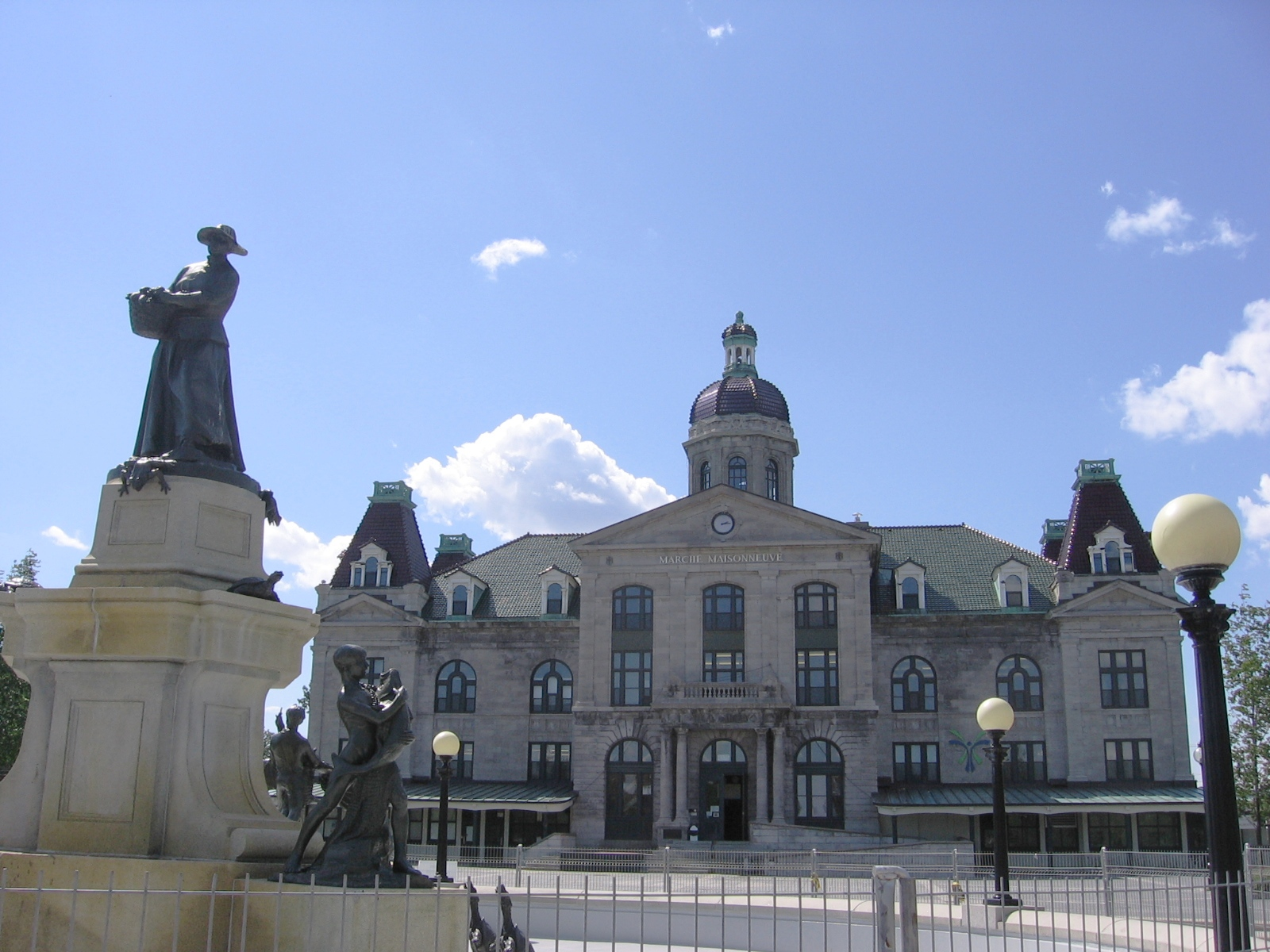

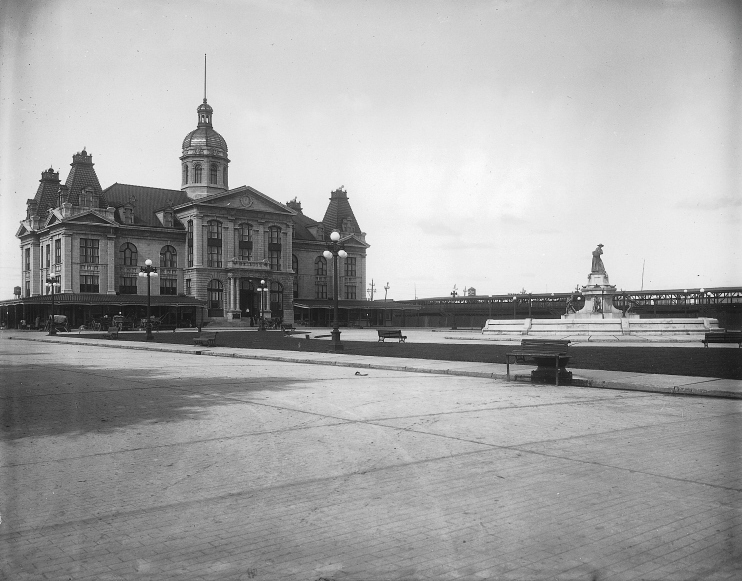
In 1916

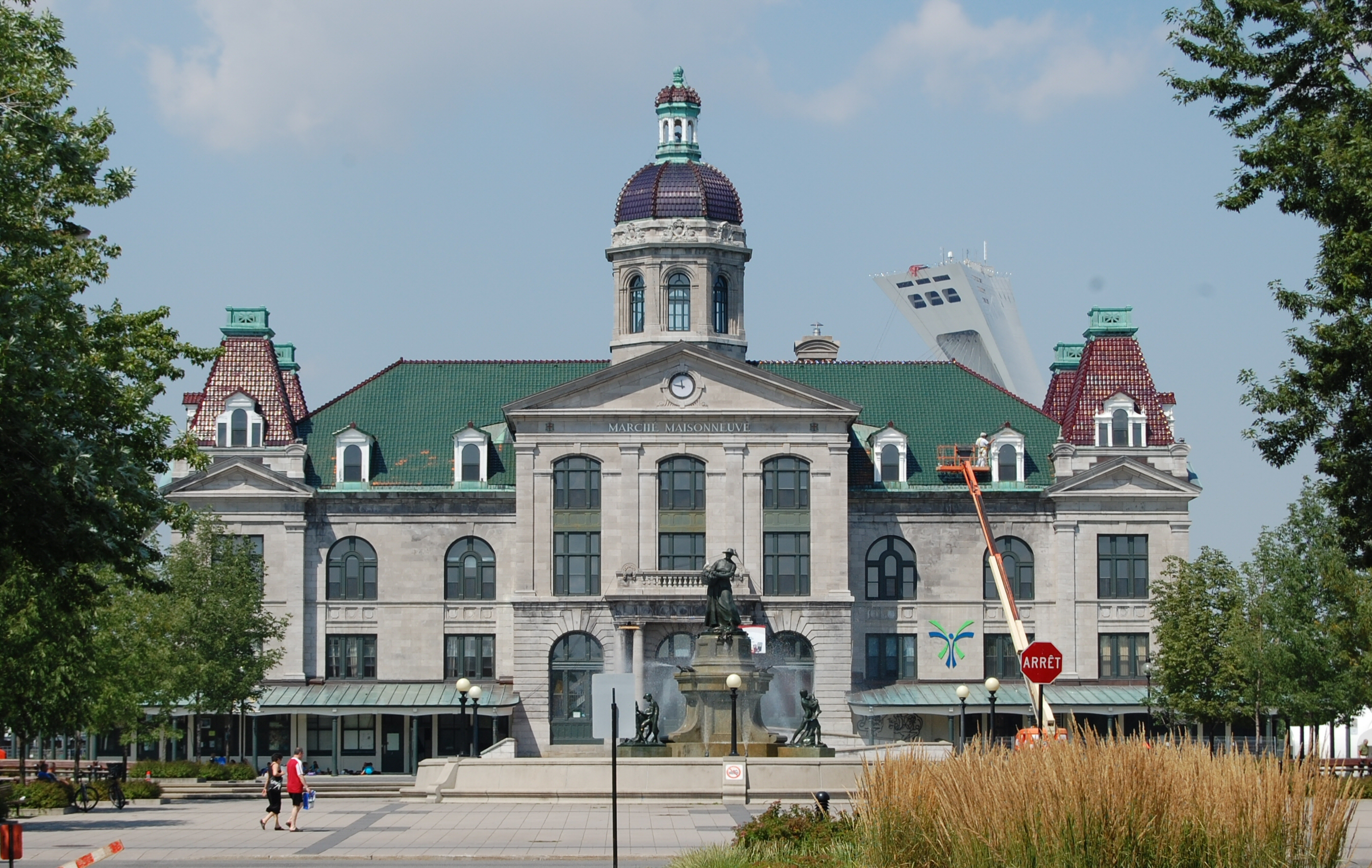

== Notes ==
- Dictionary of Canadian Biography Online - Pierre Gadoys
