= Pierre Gadois =

Pierre Gadois (1632 – 8 May 1714) came to New France with his parents, Pierre Gadoys and Louise Mauger. He was a farmer as part of his father's holdings and also a gunsmith.

Pierre's son, Jacques Gadois became a notable figure in Canadian history.
