= Tour Intact =

Coordinates: 45°30′15″N 73°34′20″W

2020 Robert-Bourassa
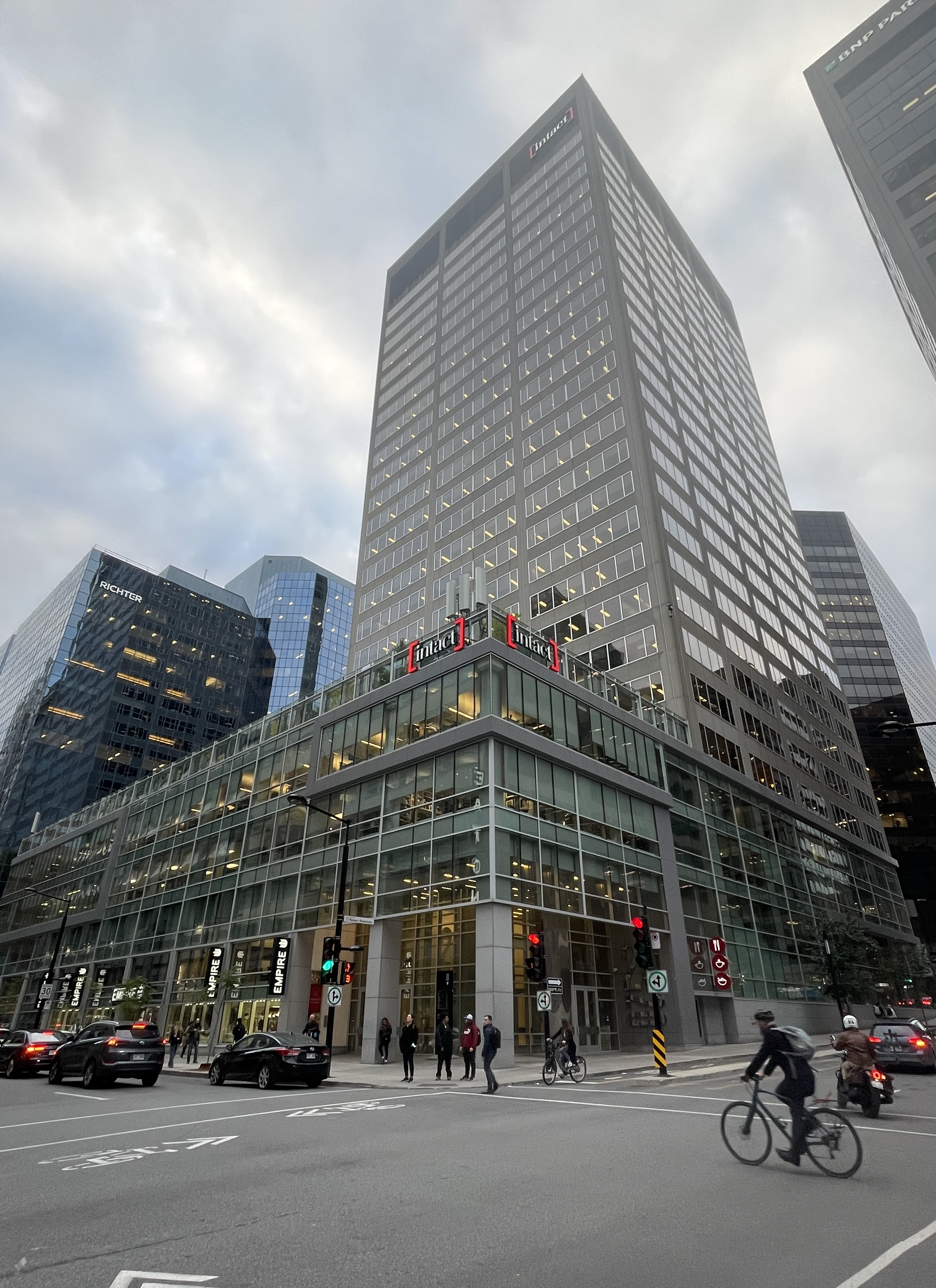
- Interactive map of the 2020 Robert-Bourassa area
- Former names: AXA Center

General information
- Type: Offices
- Location: 2020 Robert-Bourassa Boulevard; Montréal, Quebec
- Construction started: 1973
- Completed: 1974
- Owner: iA Financial Group
- Operator: Canderel

Height
- Roof: 104.0 m (341.2 ft)

Technical details
- Floor count: 26
- Lifts/elevators: 16

2020 Robert-Bourassa, currently branded as Tour Intact (Intact Tower), is a 104.0 m tall skyscraper located in Montreal, Quebec, Canada.

It was built in 1974 and hosts a number of tenants, including Home Trust, Income Access, Intact Financial, and Monster.ca. The building previously served as the headquarters for Axa Canada, which comprised a number of subsidiaries of the French-based insurance company Axa, and was acquired by Intact in 2011.

The building is located at 2020 Robert-Bourassa Boulevard between De Maisonneuve Boulevard & President Kennedy Ave, in Downtown Montreal. It is directly connected to the McGill Station of the Montreal Metro's Green Line.

== See also ==
- List of tallest buildings in Montreal
