= Ontario Street (Montreal) =

Thoroughfare in Montreal, Quebec

Coordinates: 45.5116°N 73.5666°W

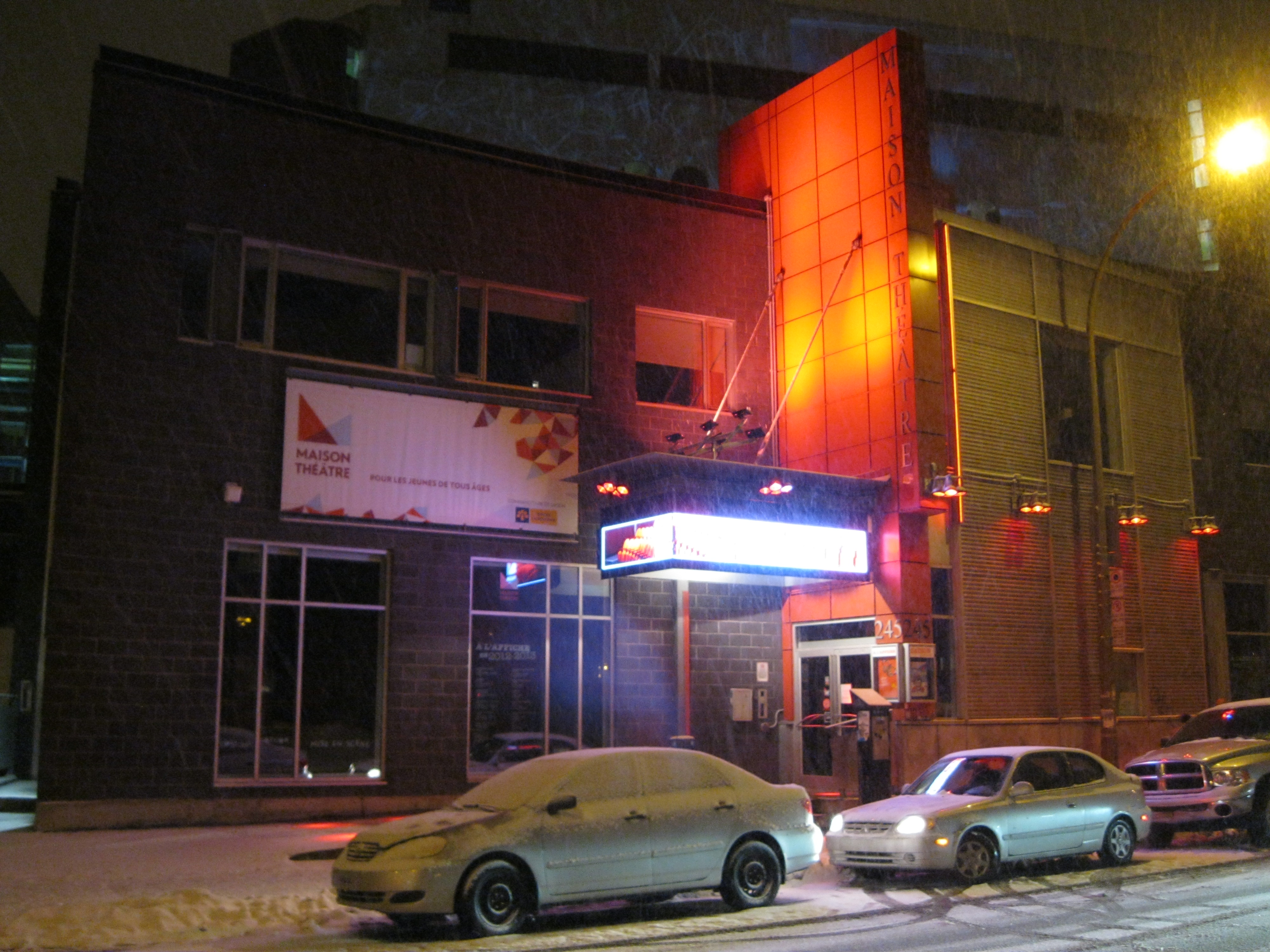
- Rue Ontario
- Interactive map of Ontario Street
- Native name: Rue Ontario (French)
- Part of: Ville-Marie, Mercier–Hochelaga-Maisonneuve
- Length: 6.1 km (3.8 mi)
- Location: Between Sherbrooke Street and Sainte-Catherine Street
- From: Saint-Urbain
- Major junctions: R-335
- To: Rue Ida-Steinberg (slightly east of Rue Viau)

Ontario Street (officially in French: rue Ontario) is an east-west artery in Montreal, Quebec, Canada. It crosses the boroughs of Ville-Marie and Mercier–Hochelaga-Maisonneuve. In the latter borough, the street becomes a mix of residential and commercial and is known as Promenade Ontario.

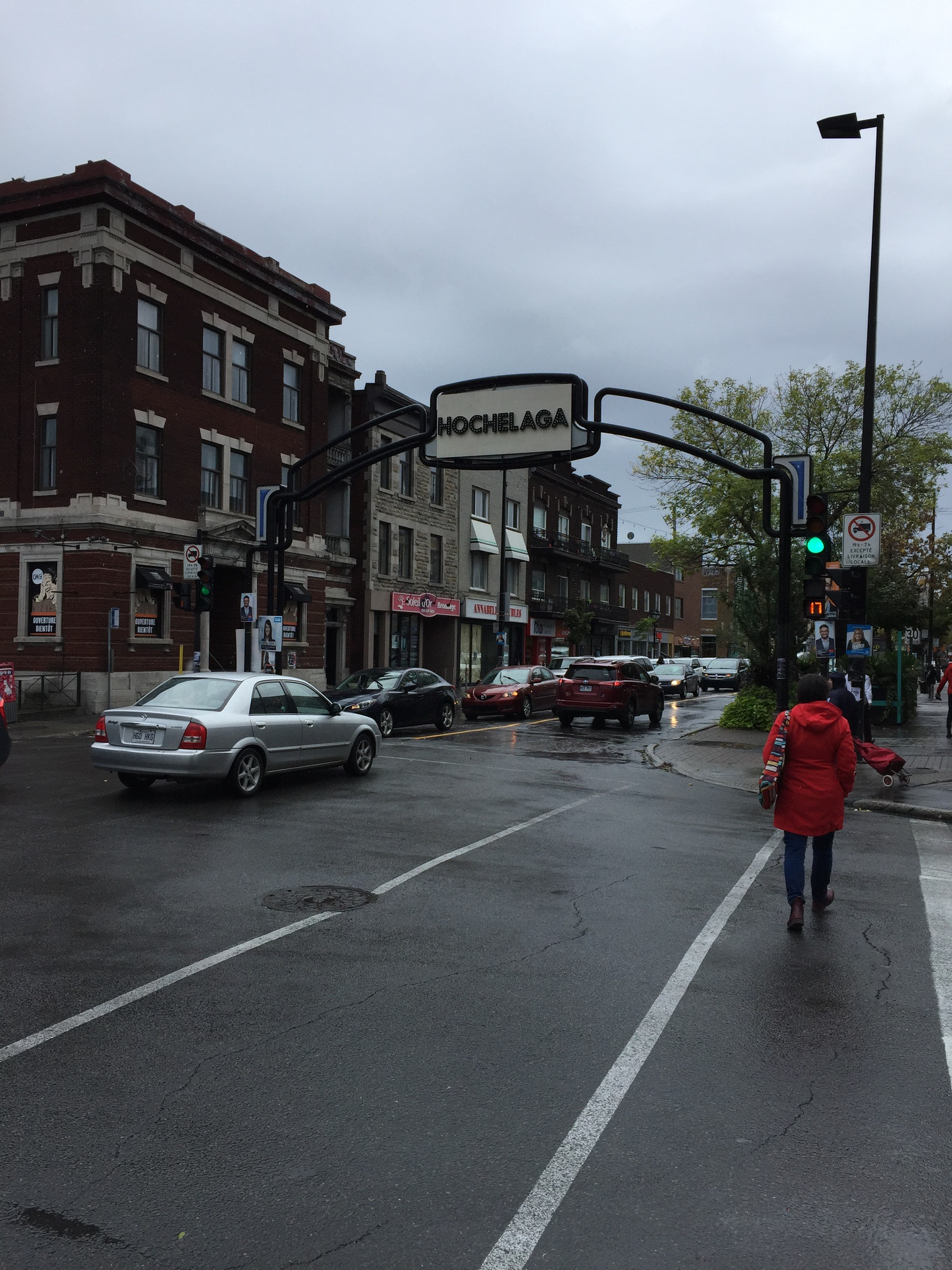
Promenade Ontario shopping area in Hochelaga

== History ==
John Solomon Cartwright (1802-1869), a banker (Bank of Upper Canada) from Kingston, Ontario, and James Bell Forsyth (1804-1845), a local merchant with family owned Forsyth, Richardson and Company, purchased and subdivided the farm of Sir John Johnson in the northern part of Faubourg Quebec. They gave the three new streets the names of three different Great Lakes: Erie, Huron, and Ontario. Ontario Street was later 1845) extended in stages toward both the east and the west. Until 1948, it was believed that the street was named after the Province of Ontario, but the discovery of the subdivision documents by a city of Montreal historian corrected that inaccuracy. Although it had been known as Ontario Street since 1842, the name was made official only in 1867.

The neighbourhoods that the street crosses, Centre-Sud and Hochelaga-Maisonneuve, fell into economic decline by the 1980s, which led to many closed businesses and a reputation for poverty and crime.

The street has long been notorious for prostitution, particularly in its eastern segment.

Since the 2010s, the street has gentrified considerably, in part from the expansion of the village on the downtown section of the street and the Promenade Ontario shopping area in Hochelaga-Maisonneuve, which becomes pedestrian in the summer.

== Geography ==
The main portion of Ontario Street runs from Saint-Urban Street in the west (in the Quartier des Spectacles) to slightly east of Rue Viau in Hochelaga-Maisonneuve. However, there are also small sections in Montreal-East and Pointe-aux-Trembles.

The downtown portion of the street is more urban and commercial, and the Hochelaga-Maisonneuve segment is partly residential and becomes pedestrian in the summer.

West of Saint-Urbain Street, it is known as President Kennedy Avenue (French: avenue du Président-Kennedy) and is home to various hotels and condominiums. This portion of the street is named after the 35th U.S. President, John F. Kennedy, and continues as far west as Mansfield Street.

Three green line metro stations are located on Ontario Street: Place des Arts, McGill, and Frontenac. The STM runs the 125 bus on the length of the street as well.

== In popular culture ==
It is the subject of Bernard Adamus's Rue Ontario, a 2010 single that portrays the street generally unfavorably.

The street is also the focus of Richard Beaulieu’s Chroniques du Centre-Sud, a 2014 graphic novel.

== Points of interest ==
=== Ontario Street ===
- Church of Nativité-de-la-Sainte-Vierge-d'Hochelaga
- JTI-Macdonald
- Faubourgs Park
- Église Notre-Dame-de-Guadalupe de Montréal
- Église du Sacré-Cœur-de-Jésus de Montréal
- Gare d'autocars de Montréal
- Habitations Jeanne-Mance

=== President Kennedy Avenue ===
- Church of St. John the Evangelist
- Université du Québec à Montréal - Pavillon President Kennedy
- Tour Intact
- 1981 McGill College
- 2000 McGill College

== See also ==
- List of memorials to John F. Kennedy
- List of buildings and monuments honoring presidents of the United States in other countries
