= Collège de Maisonneuve =

Public college in Montreal, Quebec

Coordinates: 45°33′02″N 73°33′13″W

- Type: public
- Established: 1929
- Affiliations: ACCC, CCAA, QSSF
- Students: 6,700 students
- Undergraduates: pre-university students; technical
- Location: Montreal, Quebec, Canada
- Campus: Urban
- Sports teams: Vikings
- Colours: Black and Purple
- Website: www.cmaisonneuve.qc.ca/

Collège de Maisonneuve (French pronunciation: [kɔlɛʒ də mɛzɔ̃nœv]; or Cégep de Maisonneuve) is a francophone public pre-university and technical college located in Montreal, Quebec, Canada.

== Partnerships ==
The College is affiliated with the ACCC, and CCAA.

== History ==
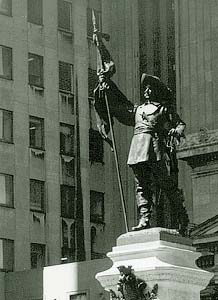
Paul Chomedey de Maisonneuve

In 1967, several institutions were merged and became public ones, when the Quebec system of public colleges was created. Collège de Maisonneuve was named after Paul Chomedey de Maisonneuve.

On the 5 of May 1973 the Société Générale des Étudiants et Étudiantes du Collège de Maisonneuve (SoGÉÉCoM) was created. It is still the association of Maisonneuve students.

== Programs ==
The college offers two types of programs: pre-university and technical. The pre-university programs, which take two years to complete, cover the subject matters which roughly correspond to the additional year of high school given elsewhere in Canada, as well as an introductory specialization that generally happens in freshman year, in preparation for a chosen field in university. The technical programs, which take three years to complete, applies to students who wish to pursue a skilled trade. In addition, continuing education and services to business are provided.

== See also ==
- List of colleges in Quebec
- Higher education in Quebec
