= Church of Nativité-de-la-Sainte-Vierge-d'Hochelaga =

Church in Montreal, Quebec, Canada

Coordinates: 45°32′28″N 73°32′47″W

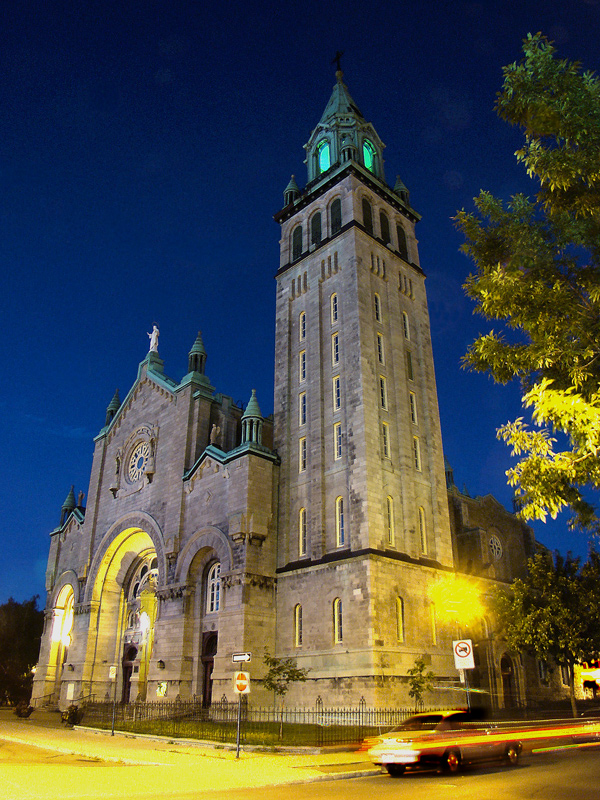
Church of Nativité-de-la-Sainte-Vierge-d'Hochelaga

Church of Nativité-de-la-Sainte-Vierge-d'Hochelaga (French: Église Nativité-de-la-Sainte-Vierge-d'Hochelaga) is a Roman Catholic church in the borough of Mercier–Hochelaga-Maisonneuve in Montreal, Quebec, Canada. Its address is 1855 Dézery Street. Its construction was completed in 1924.

== History ==
While the parish was founded in 1867, the first building only opened in 1877. It was destroyed by fire in 1921. The same year, Father Georges-Marie LePailleur rebuilt the parish church on the same site, using the facade and the bell tower that had been recovered. The bell tower, dating from 1906, is over 80 meters. Surmounted by an arrow, it contains five bells, of which the heaviest weighs about 2500 kg.

Father LePailleur cherished the dream of establishing an independent bishopric in the diocese of Montreal. He asked Dalbé Viau and Alphonse Venne, the same architects who designed Saint Joseph's Oratory, to perform the reconstruction. He requested it to be elevated to ensure that his church would have the necessary stature to become a cathedral. While the church never became a cathedral, it is large enough.

== Interior decoration ==
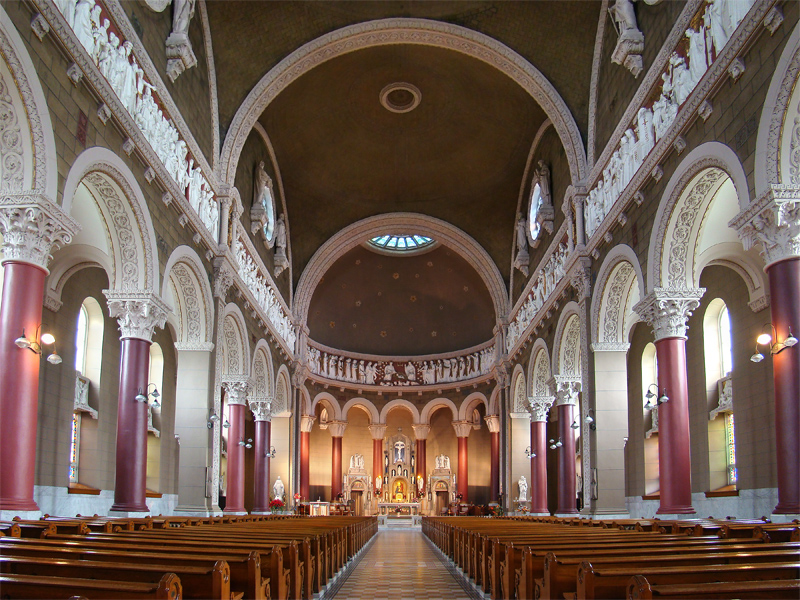
The interior

The interior decoration was entrusted in 1921 to Montreal artists Alexander Carli and Nicholas Petrucci who enjoyed an excellent reputation for statuary. In addition to the stone and marble high altar, they also made both side altars, the balustrade of the choir, the Stations of the Cross in stone from Caen coated with plaster, and above the frieze, the statues of the Twelve Apostles.

The most spectacular work of Carli Petrucci is unquestionably the monumental frieze of The Apotheosis of the Virgin Mary, installed in 1927. It presents 27 paintings depicting the life of the Blessed Virgin, religious institutions and the bishops of Montreal as well as the founders of this city.

The frieze contains depictions of 320 people, life size, made of plaster or marble dust dissolved in the adhesive. Its dimensions are impressive: it measures 2.14 meters high and spans the entire perimeter of the church, just below the ceiling.

Devoted to the Virgin, the 14 windows, made in 1964-1965, are the work of the master Guido Nincheri.

== The monumental frieze in pictures ==
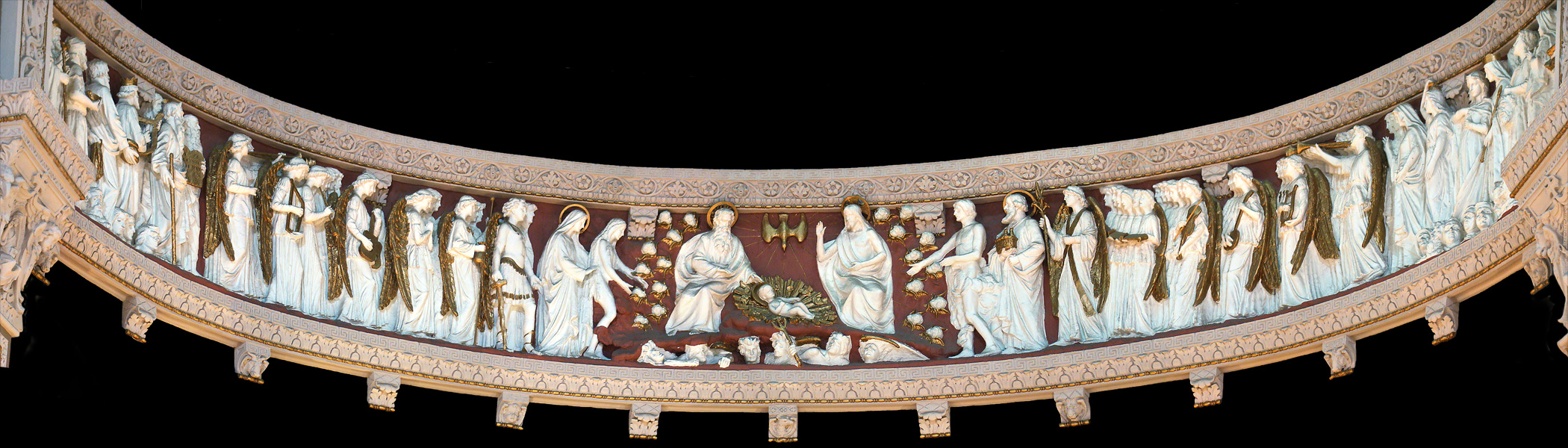
Above the choir

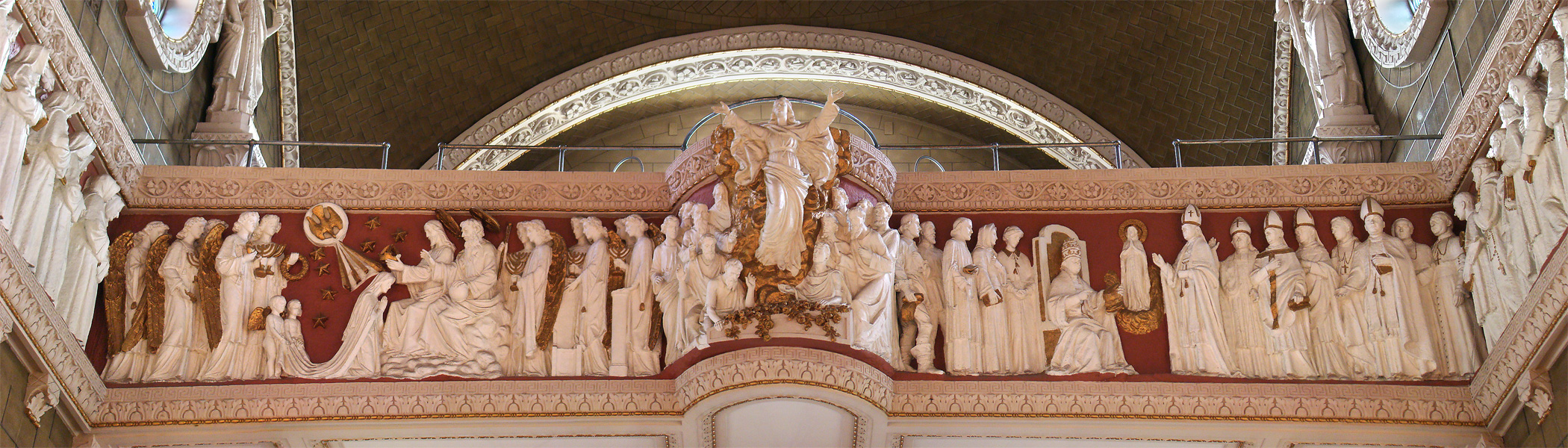
Above the main entrance

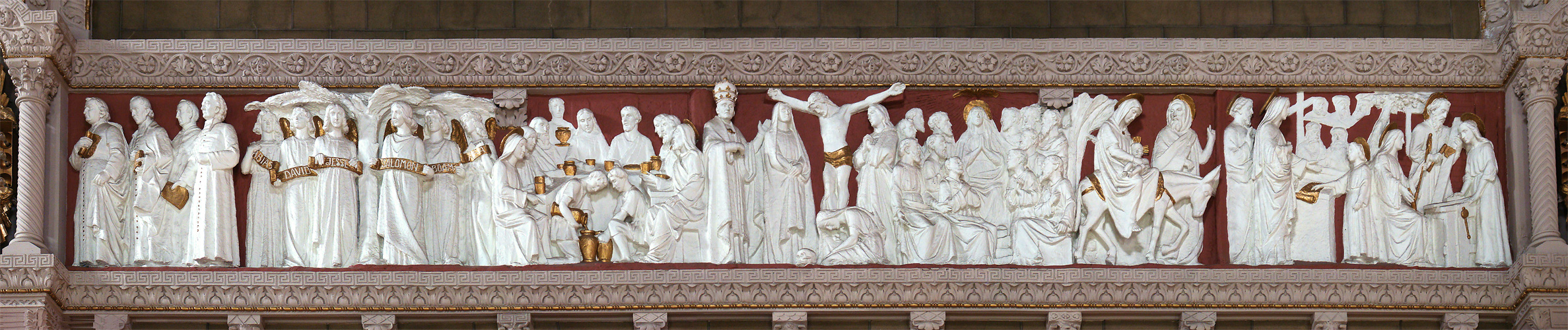
Nave north side

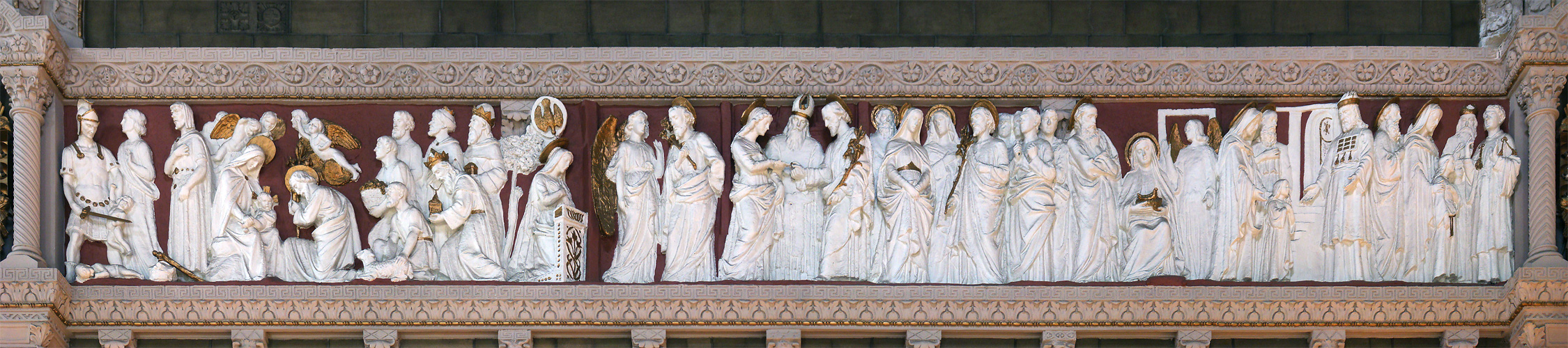
Nave north side

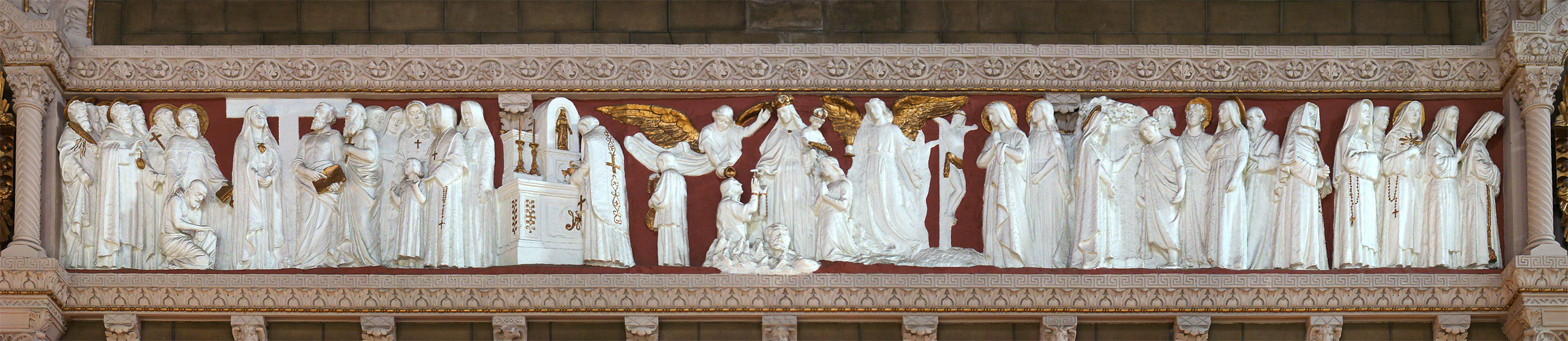
Nave south side
