= Pierre Gadoys =

Pierre Gadoys (c. 1594 – October 1667) is recognized as the first farmer at Montreal.

Gadoys first came to New France as part of a settlement initiative by Robert Giffard de Moncel who was heavily involved in the colonization of the emerging colonies at the time. Records have him living in the colony at Quebec in 1636 employed by the Société Notre-Dame de Montréal at Sainte-Foy from 1643 to 1645.

Gadoys and his family moved to Montreal shortly after this time since in 1648, the governor, Paul de Chomedey de Maisonneuve made the first land grant in Ville Marie to him. François Dollier de Casson, the author of the Histoire du Montréal, referred to him as the first farmer of Ville Marie.

In 1661, he fought with Charles le Moyne against the Iroquois. After his death Saint-Pierre street was named in his honour.

Pierre Gadoys was married to Louise Mauger in the 1620s and they had three children who are known to historians. One, Pierre Gadois, gained notability in Canadian history.
