= Maisonneuve Market =

Public market in Montreal

Coordinates: 45.5541°N 73.5393°W

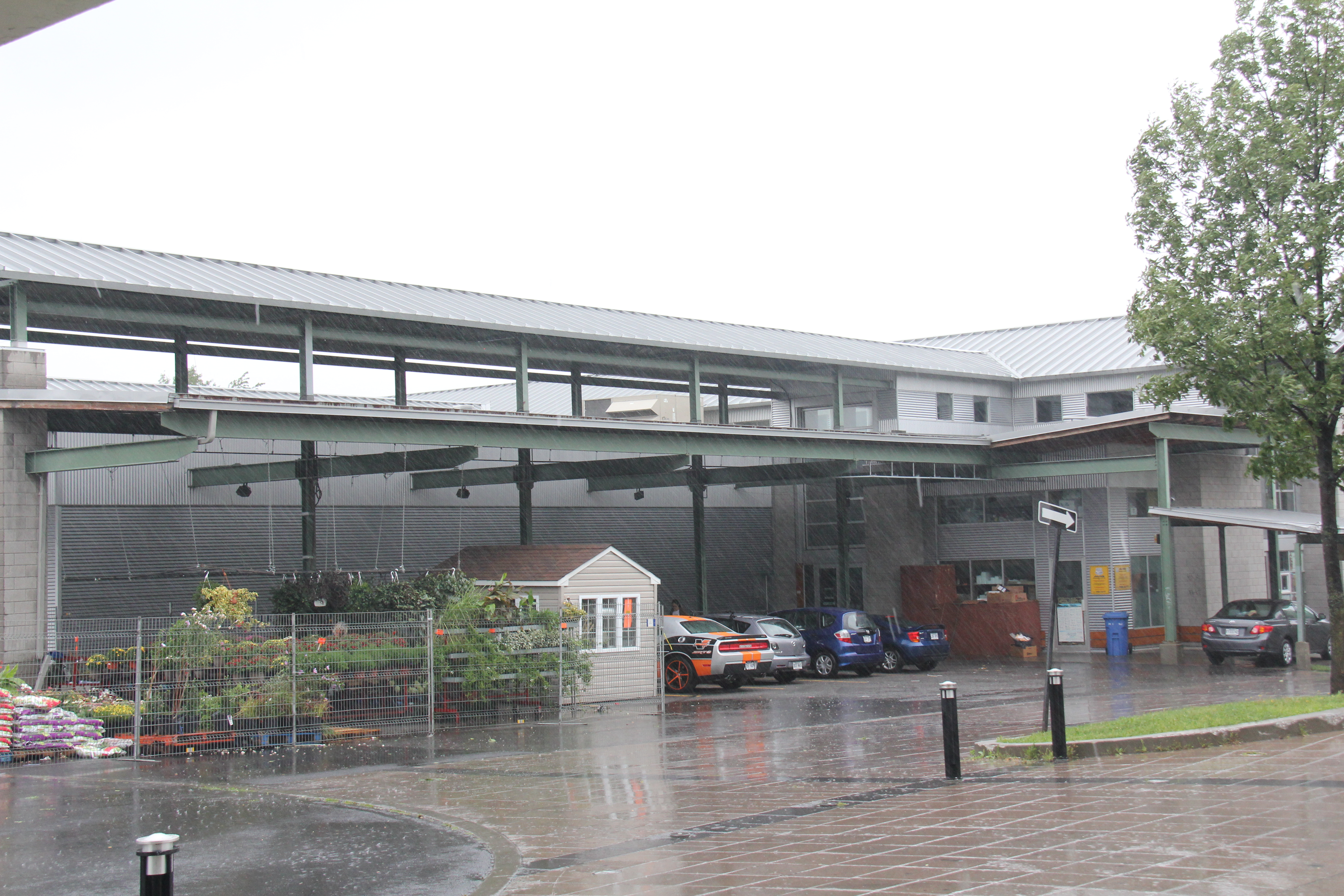
The modern market buildings

Maisonneuve Market (French: Marché Maisonneuve) is a public market in Montreal, Quebec, Canada. It is located at 4445 Ontario Street East in the borough of Mercier–Hochelaga-Maisonneuve.

It is bordered by Ontario Street to the south, William-David Street to the east, Place Gennevilliers Laliberté to the west and north. It can be reached from Pie-IX and Viau stations on the Montreal Metro's Green Line.

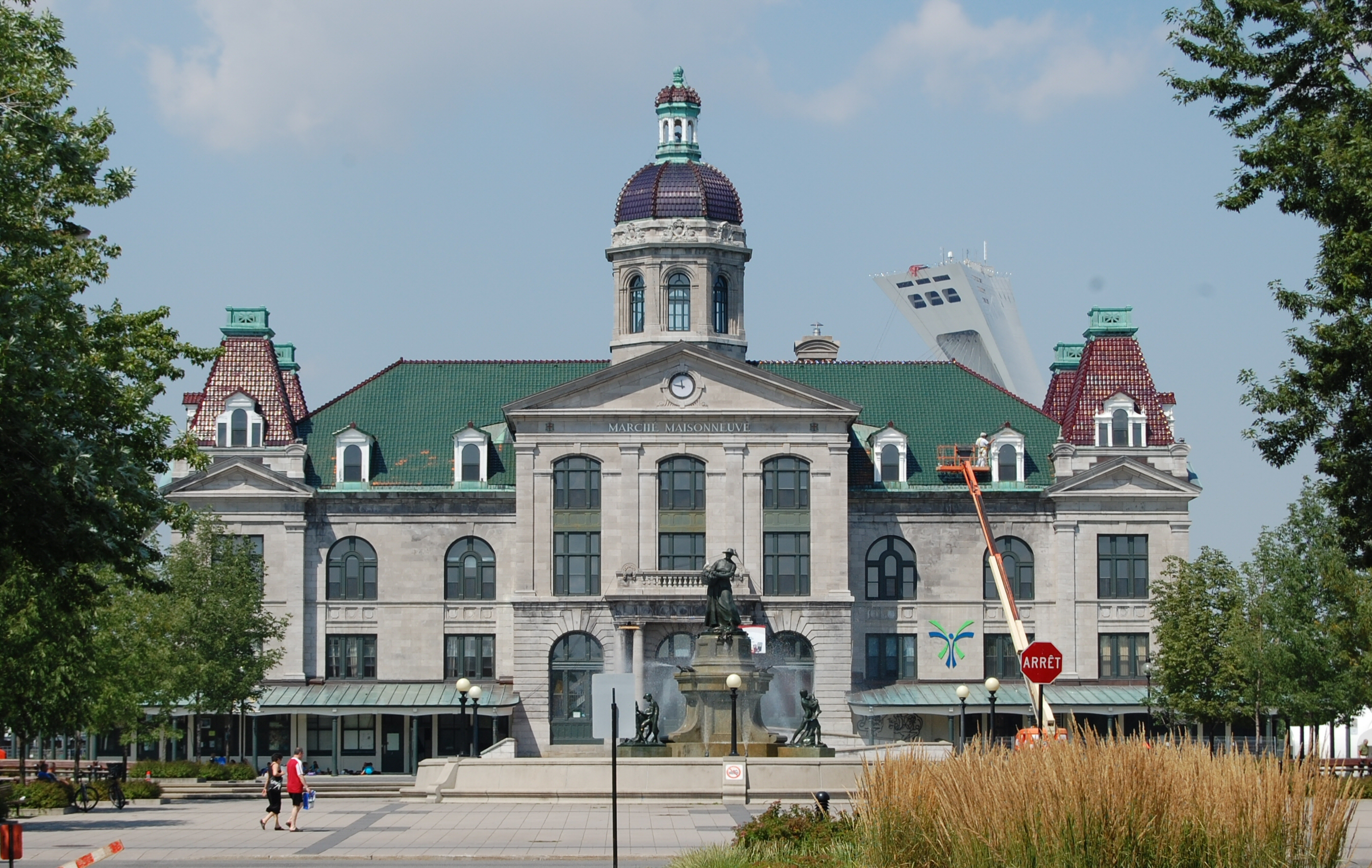
The original Maisonneuve Market building constructed in 1912.

The original market was built in 1912 according to plans by architect Marius Dufresne. The present building opened in 1995, replacing umbrella shelters installed in 1980.
