= Olympic Park (Montreal) =

Sports and entertainment precinct in Montreal

Coordinates: 45°33′35″N 73°33′03″W

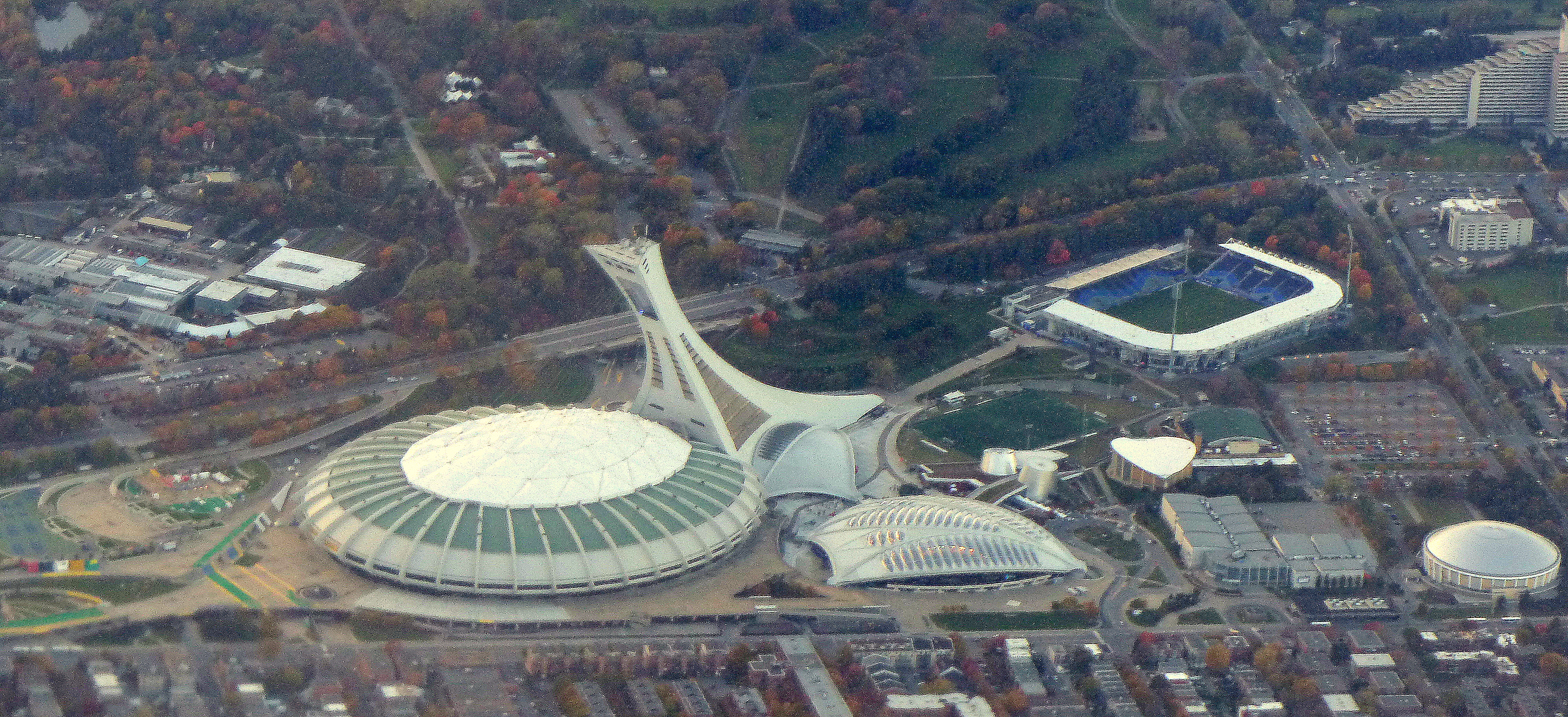

1	The Esplanade
2	Olympic Stadium
3	Montreal Tower
4	Olympic Pool

5	Biodome
6	Planetarium
7	Saputo Stadium
8	Centre Charbonneau

9	StarCité Montreal
10	Richard Arena

The Montreal Olympic Park (French: Parc olympique de Montréal) is a sports and entertainment precinct located in the Hochelaga-Maisonneuve neighbourhood of Montreal, Quebec. It is separated from Maisonneuve Park and the Montreal Botanical Garden by Sherbrooke Street on its northern end (in Montreal's cardinal regime), and bordered by Viau Street to its east, Pierre de Coubertin Avenue to its south, and Pie-IX Boulevard to its west.

Built in the mid-1970s on land that was previously part of Maisonneuve Park's golf course, the precinct housed the central cluster of venues of the 1976 Summer Olympics, consisting the Olympic Stadium, Olympic Pool, Olympic Velodrome, Maurice Richard Arena, and Centre Pierre Charbonneau. Saputo Stadium would be added to the precinct in the mid-2000s. Following the Olympics, facilities other than sports venues were also built in the precinct, including the Montreal Tower, Biodome, Planetarium, and a multiplex cinema.

== Olympic Stadium ==
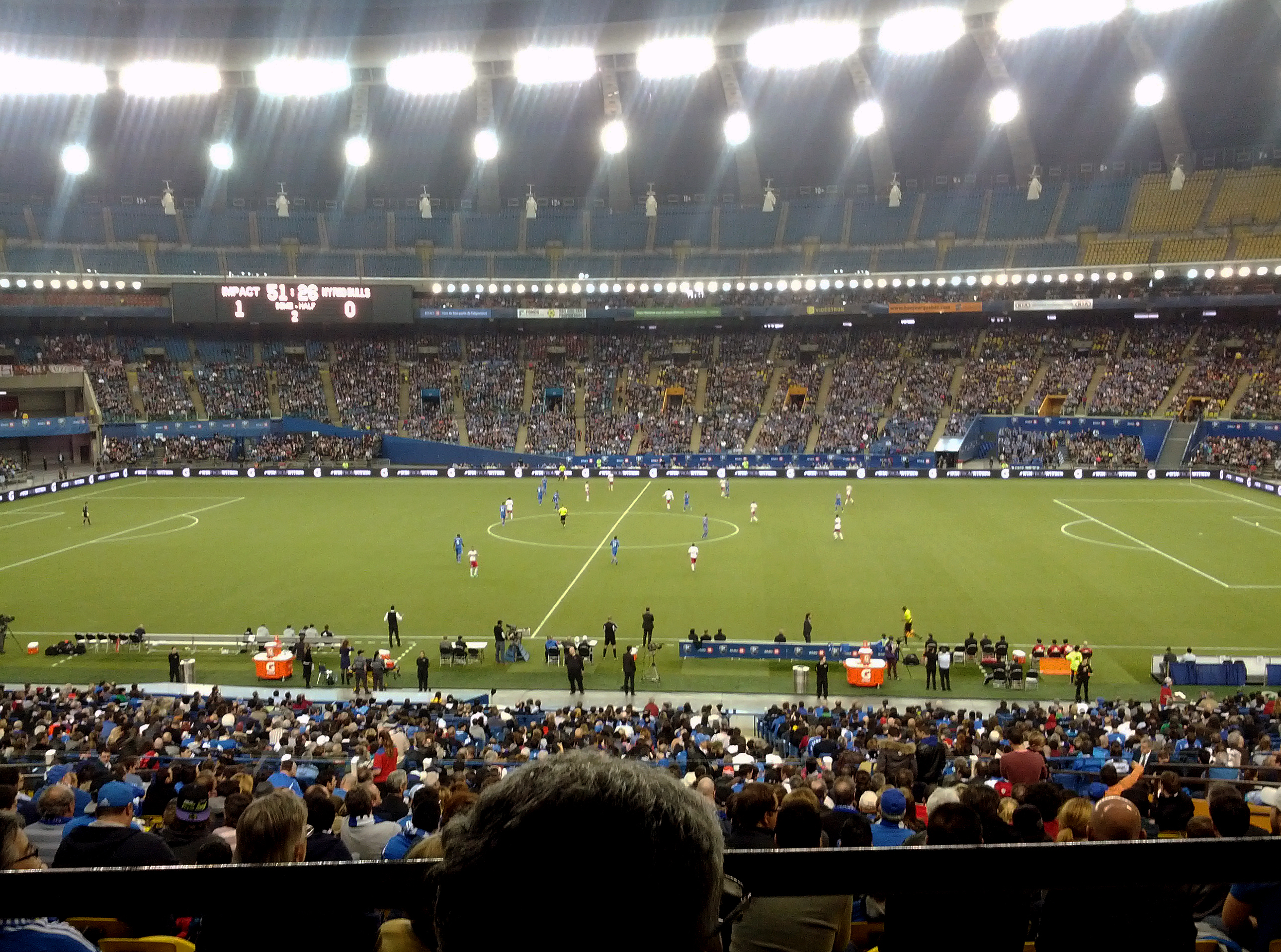
View inside the Olympic Stadium.

The Olympic Stadium is a multi-purpose stadium built in the mid-1970s as the main venue for the 1976 Summer Olympics, it is nicknamed "The Big O", a reference to both its name and to the doughnut shape of the permanent component of the stadium's roof.

The stadium is the largest by seating capacity in Canada. After the Olympics, artificial turf was installed and was used by the Expos, Montreal's professional baseball team, the Montreal Alouettes, Montreal's professional football team and CF Montréal, Montreal's professional soccer team. The stadium currently serves as a multipurpose facility for special events (e.g. concerts, trade shows) with a permanent seating capacity of 56,040.

== Montreal Tower ==
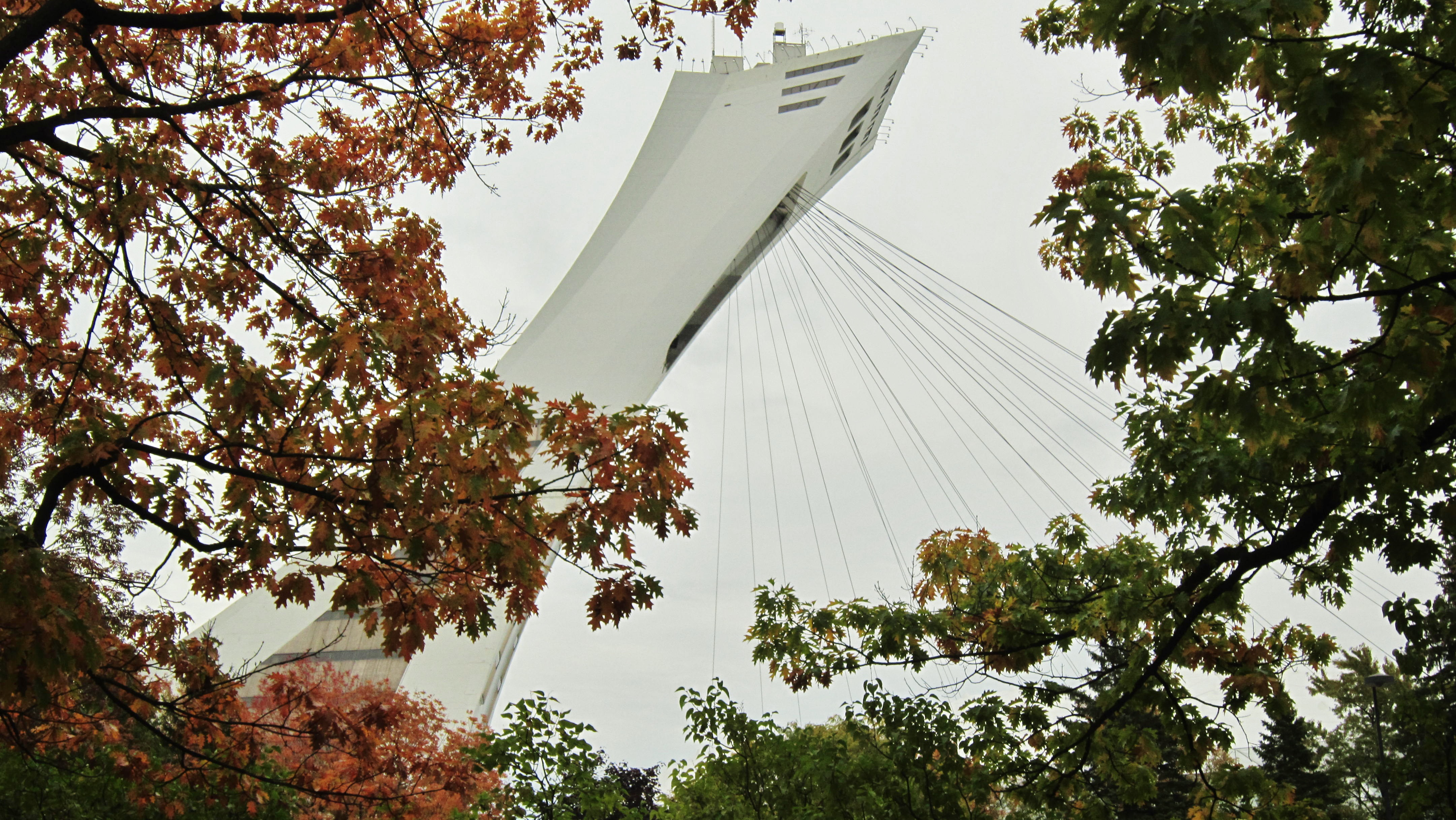
View of Montreal Tower from the Montreal Botanical Garden.

The Montreal Tower, part of the city's Olympic Stadium and Olympic Park and formerly known as the Olympic Tower, is the tallest inclined structure in the world at 165-metre (541 ft), and the tenth tallest structure in Montreal. It was designed by architect Roger Taillibert and leans at an angle of 45°, much larger than that of the Leaning Tower of Pisa (less than 4°).

== Biodome ==
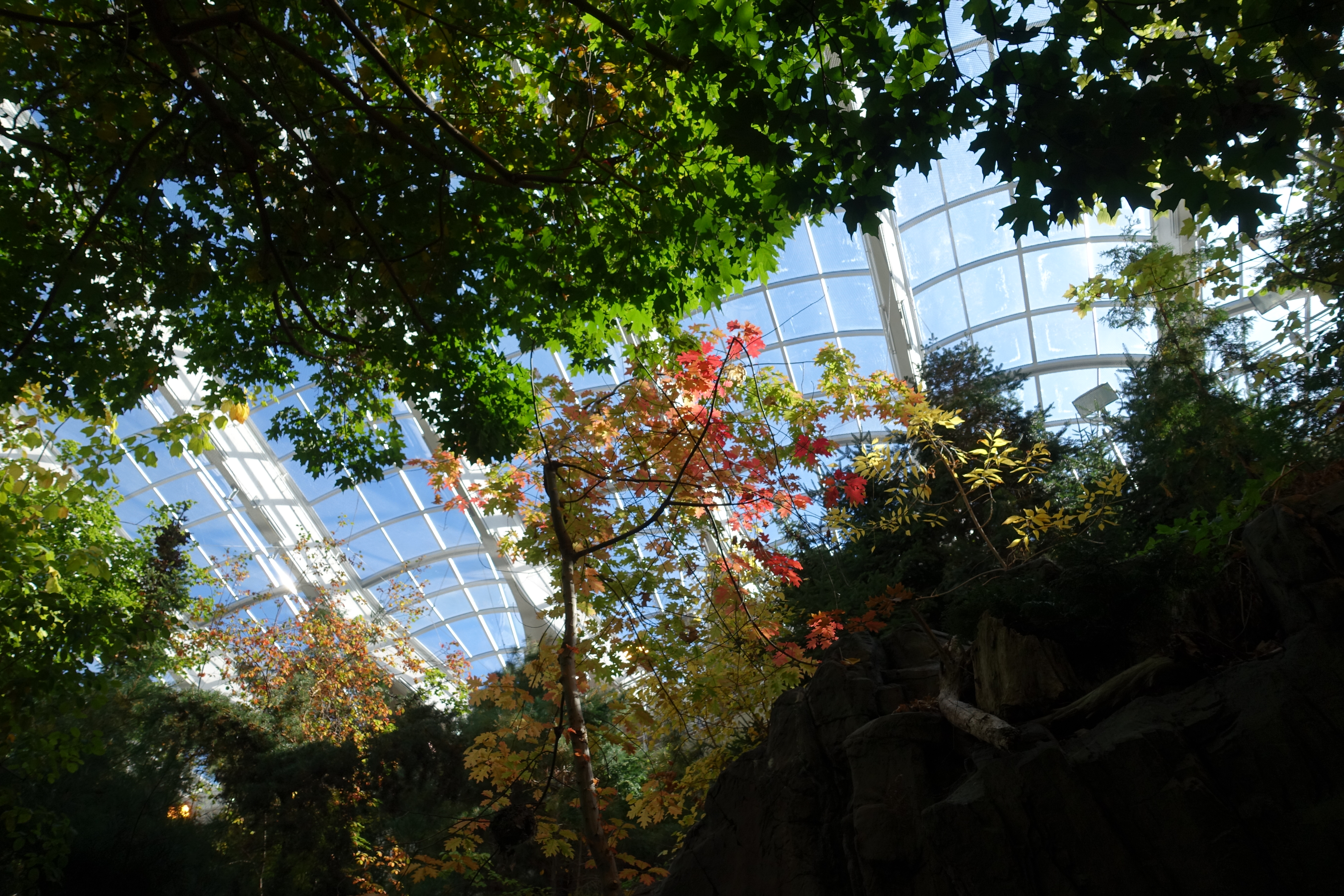
A scene inside the Biodome, depicting a maple forest in the Laurentian Mountains.

The Montreal Biodome is a facility that allows visitors to walk through replicas of four ecosystems found in the Americas. These ecosystems are the Tropical Forest, the Laurentian Forest, the Saint Lawrence Marine Eco-system and the Sub-Polar Region. The building was originally constructed for the 1976 Olympic Games as a velodrome with 2,600 seats. It hosted both track cycling and judo events. Renovations on the building began in 1989 and in 1992 the indoor nature exhibit was opened. It is part of the Espace pour la Vie district of museums centered around life and nature.

== Rio Tinto Alcan Planetarium ==
View of the Planetarium from the Montreal Tower's inclined elevator.

The Planetarium, also known as the Rio Tinto Alcan Planetarium, is one of the newer additions to Olympic Park. It started its operations in 2013, replacing Montreal's previous planetarium, which closed in 2011. The planetarium features a number of films and expositions centered around astronomy and outer space. It is part of the Espace pour la Vie district of museums centered around life and nature.

== Saputo Stadium ==
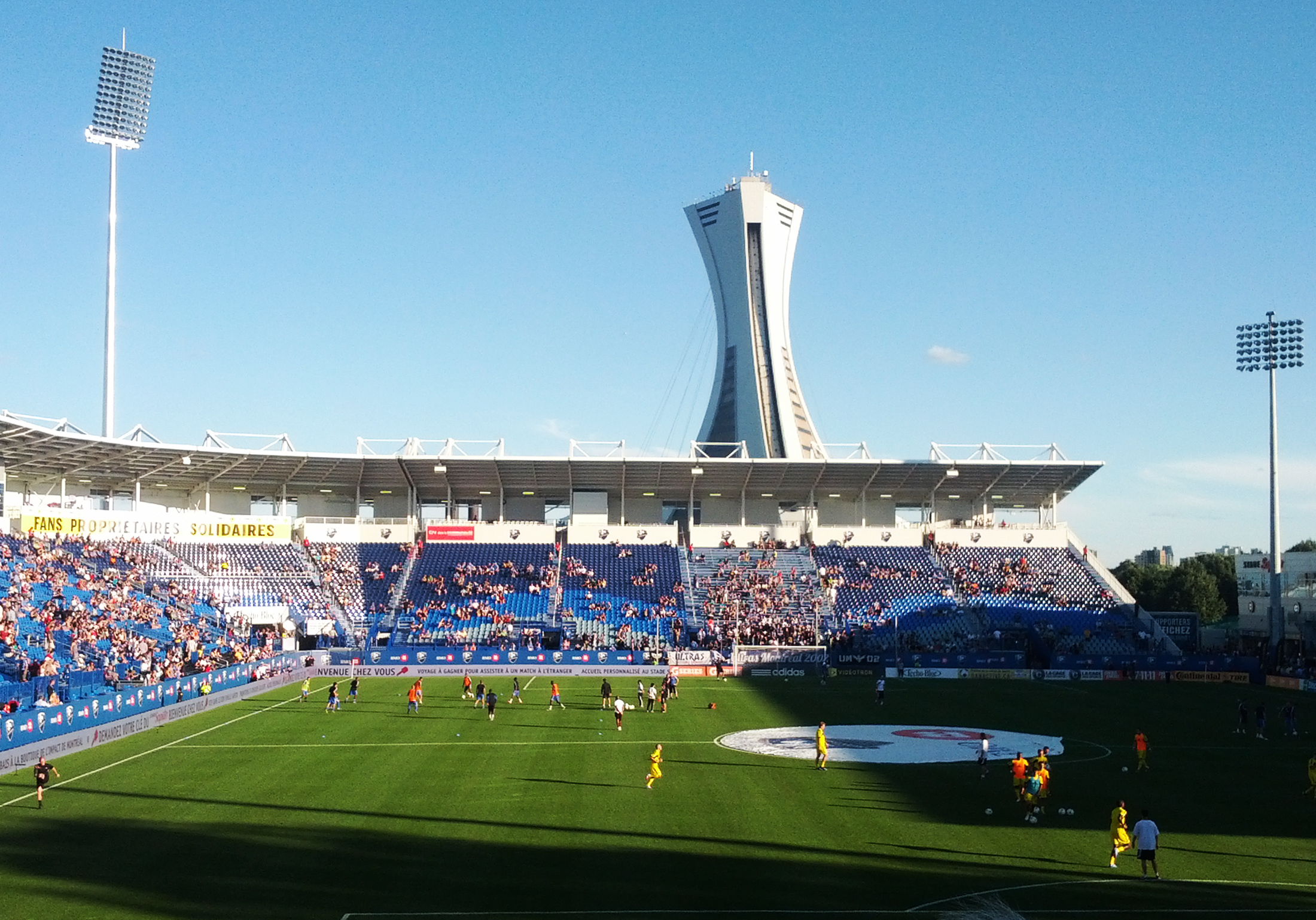
View inside Saputo Stadium, with the Montreal Tower visible in the background.

The Saputo Stadium is a soccer-specific stadium and is home to the CF Montréal (formerly the Montreal Impact). It became the CF Montréal's home stadium in 2008 when they moved there from Complexe sportif Claude-Robillard. It is Canada's second largest soccer-specific stadium.

== Other facilities ==
- Olympic Athletes' Village
- Maurice Richard Arena (Olympic host of boxing and wrestling events)
- Pierre Charbonneau Centre (Olympic host of wrestling)
- Olympic Pool (Olympic host of swimming events)
- Additionally: Famous Players' Starcité theater, and the Montreal Metro stations Pie-IX and Viau

The area west of Olympic Stadium, home to various outdoor events, is known as the Esplanade. Adjacent to the park across Sherbrooke Street is Maisonneuve Park, which contains the Montreal Botanical Garden (Olympic host of Athletics (20 km walk) and Modern pentathlon) and Montreal Insectarium.

In October 2017, an area in the park that was once referred to as "The Place des Vainqueurs" was renamed "Place Nadia Comaneci" in honour of the Romanian gymnast.
