= D'Coque =

Sports and cultural centre in Luxembourg City, Luxembourg

Coque
- Centre National Sportif et Culturel Coque
- Coque in June 2019
- Interactive map of Coque
- Full name: National Sports and Cultural Centre Coque
- Address: 2, rue Léon Hengen L-1745
- Location: Kirchberg, Luxembourg City
- Coordinates: 49°37′25″N 06°09′15″E
- Owner: Public Building Administration, Luxembourg Government
- Capacity: 8,300 (indoor arena)
- Type: Olympic-sized swimming pool, indoor arena, sports centre, hotel and conference centre
- Public transit: Coque tram stop, Luxtram RGTR bus stops: Europe; Erasme-d'Coque; Antoine de St Exupéry; AVL bus stops: Léon Hengen; Antoine de St Exupéry

Construction
- Opened: 14 April 1982
- Expanded: 15 December 1997 – 8 June 2002
- Architect: Roger Taillibert

Website
- coque.lu
- Building details

Other information
- Number of rooms: 36 double rooms (2 beds)

Website
- coque.lu/en/coque-hotel

The National Sports and Culture Centre d'Coque (French: Centre National Sportif et Culturel d'Coque), better known simply as d'Coque, (English: The Hull or The Shell) is a sporting and cultural venue with an indoor arena and Olympic-sized swimming pool, amongst other facilities, in Kirchberg, a district of Luxembourg City, in Luxembourg. More recently it has expanded into providing onsite hotel services, and acting as a conference venue.

== History ==
=== Planning ===
Plans for an ambitious national sports venue, as part of wider national sports programme in Luxembourg began in the 1960s with a stated aim of the government of the time being to compete in the international arena, where it was believed it could make a name for itself. On 12 July 1969, the then Minister of Physical Education and Sports, Gaston Thorn, organised a roundtable with stakeholders, where the most preeminent view was that modern sports facilities should be available and easily accessible to athletes and civil society in Luxembourg of all levels and ages.

In February 1974, French architect Roger Taillibert presented his bold plans for futuristic swimming pool and sporting arena, which captured the spirit of the Luxembourg state's desire to construct a public landmark dedicated to its national sporting ambitions and open to civil society at large. State planners decided to construct the venue on the Kirchberg plateau, which at the time was largely undeveloped former farmland. Amongst other reasons for the decision, was the cheap and readily available land, the desire for urban development of the area, and an ambition to keep and further attract the European Communities (now European Union) institutions located there. The sporting complex was divided into an Olympic-sized swimming pool, and an indoor arena. Most strikingly, the venues, wrought of glass, pre-stressed concrete and wood, were to be encased in and connected via six giant shell or upside-down-hull copper roof structures from which the French name, d'Coque derived. Tallibert's designs were heavily informed by his then ongoing works on the Montreal Olympic Park, for the 1976 Summer Olympics. Similarities in design, materials and architectural style are particularly visible when comparing d'Coque with his work on Montreal's Olympic pool, stadium and velodrome (since refurbished as a biodome).

=== Construction ===
The project was divided into two stages, with priority given to the swimming pool, on which construction began in 1974. Initial construction work was dogged by a rumour in the national press that the olympic pool did not meet the international requirements for a length of 50 metres owing to miscalculations in the planning stage. Though this later proved to be untrue, significant delays were incurred with the swimming pool inaugurated behind schedule on 14 April 1982. However, the controversy was short-lived with residents, sports professional and amateurs alike enthralled with the quality of the facilities.

Throughout the 80's, owing to the economic climate, state funds were not readily available for work on the second phase of the project. In addition, residents, politicians and planners had expressed a desire for amendments to the plans to be made to permit the indoor athletics arena to be utilised not only as a sporting arena, but a cultural venue as well.

Following a turnaround in Luxembourg's finances, the Chamber of Deputies approved the allocation of some 2.5 billion francs, (62 million euros) for the second phase. Work began in earnest in 1997, with then Minister of Public Works, Robert Goebbels and Minister of Sports, Georges Wohlfart taking part in the breaking ground ceremony. In 2000, the now officially named "National Sports and Culture Centre d'Coque" was given legal personality as a public body requisite to complete its objectives. The new building, which included renovations to the swimming pool and existing structures, to allow their seamless integration, was completed in 2002. It included, aside from the additional athletics and cultural venue, spa, physiotherapy and catering facilities, as well as lodgings for competing athletes.

=== FondsKirchberg ===
Works on the second phase coincided with other developments on the Kirchberg, promoted by the FondsKirchberg (English: Kirchberg Fund), an urban development body. This included the development of the N51 expressway, which bordered the south of the sports centre into the beautified Avenue John F. Kennedy, with two separated bus lanes (one later converted into a tram lane) and wide pedestrian sidewalks providing easy public access to the venue. The relocation of the European School of Luxembourg to a new Kirchberg site was also underway, and the decision was made to landscape the territory in between d'Coque and the new campus to provide a public park, with an artificial lake and water features, and a small open-air amphitheatre.

== Venue ==
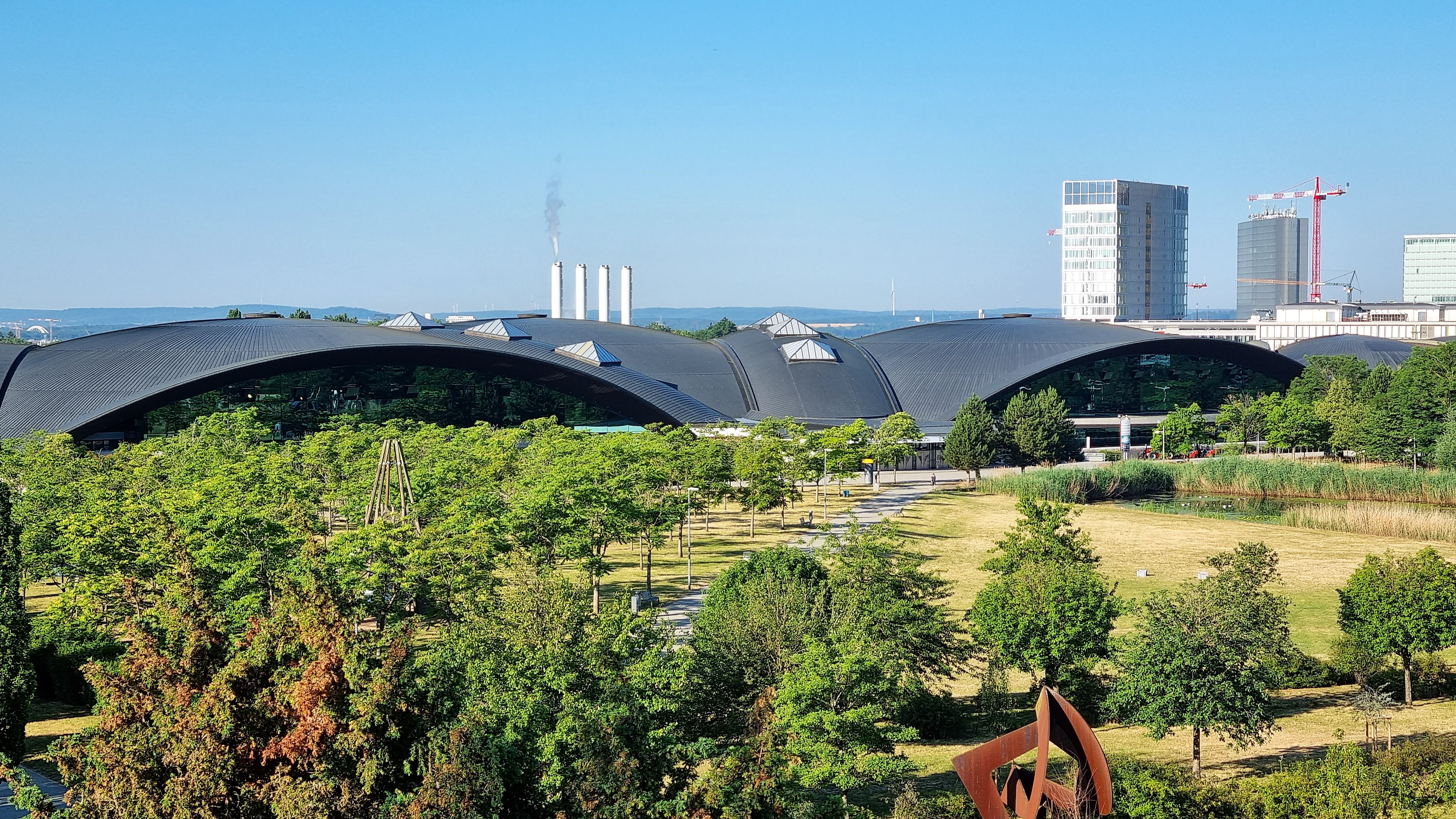
The venue in June 2023

=== Cultural events ===
The d'Coque indoor arena can be converted into a cultural venue, with retractable seating that can be extended over the athletics floor to permit audiences closer access to the stage. The complex has played host to a number of notable figures including the Dalai Lama's official visit to Luxembourg, and Elton John.

=== Sports events ===
In 2013, Games of the Small States of Europe (GSSE) which saw athletes from the nine member countries of the GSSE compete in eleven disciplines.
