= Claude Provencher =

Canadian architect (1949–2022)

- Born: June 11, 1949; Plessisville, Quebec
- Died: May 6, 2022 (aged 72)
- Occupation: Architect
- Practice: Provencher_Roy
- Projects: World Trade Centre Montreal, Montreal Tower, Ilôt Balmoral

Claude Provencher OAQ, OAA, AAPPQ, ARAC (RCA), FRIAC (Plessisville, June 11, 1949 – May 6, 2022) was a Canadian architect. In 1983, together with Michel Roy he founded the architecture firm Provencher_Roy in Montréal. He is considered one of the pioneers of modern urban architecture.

== Biography ==
Claude Provencher was born in Plessisvile, Québec in June, 1949. He graduated in Architecture from the University of Montréal in 1974. He went on to work for the architecture firm Papineau, Gérin-Lajoie, Leblanc Architectes, where he met his would-be partner Michel Roy. After 10 years in this firm, the two founded Provencher_Roy in 1983. Provencher led the practice as senior designer for four decades, taking it through a considerable number of architectural and urban design projects, and being recognized by more than 70 prizes and mentions.

In 2011, he contributed to the creation of the Conseil du patrimoine culturel du Québec (formerly the Commission of Cultural Property of Quebec). He also sat on the Advisory Committee on Planning, Design and Realty of the National Capital Commission in Ottawa (1996-2011), was a member of the Board of Directors of the Canadian Conference of the Arts; and of Heritage Montreal. He was also involved in numerous university committees and organizations dedicated to the promotion of excellence in architecture.

== Relevant work ==
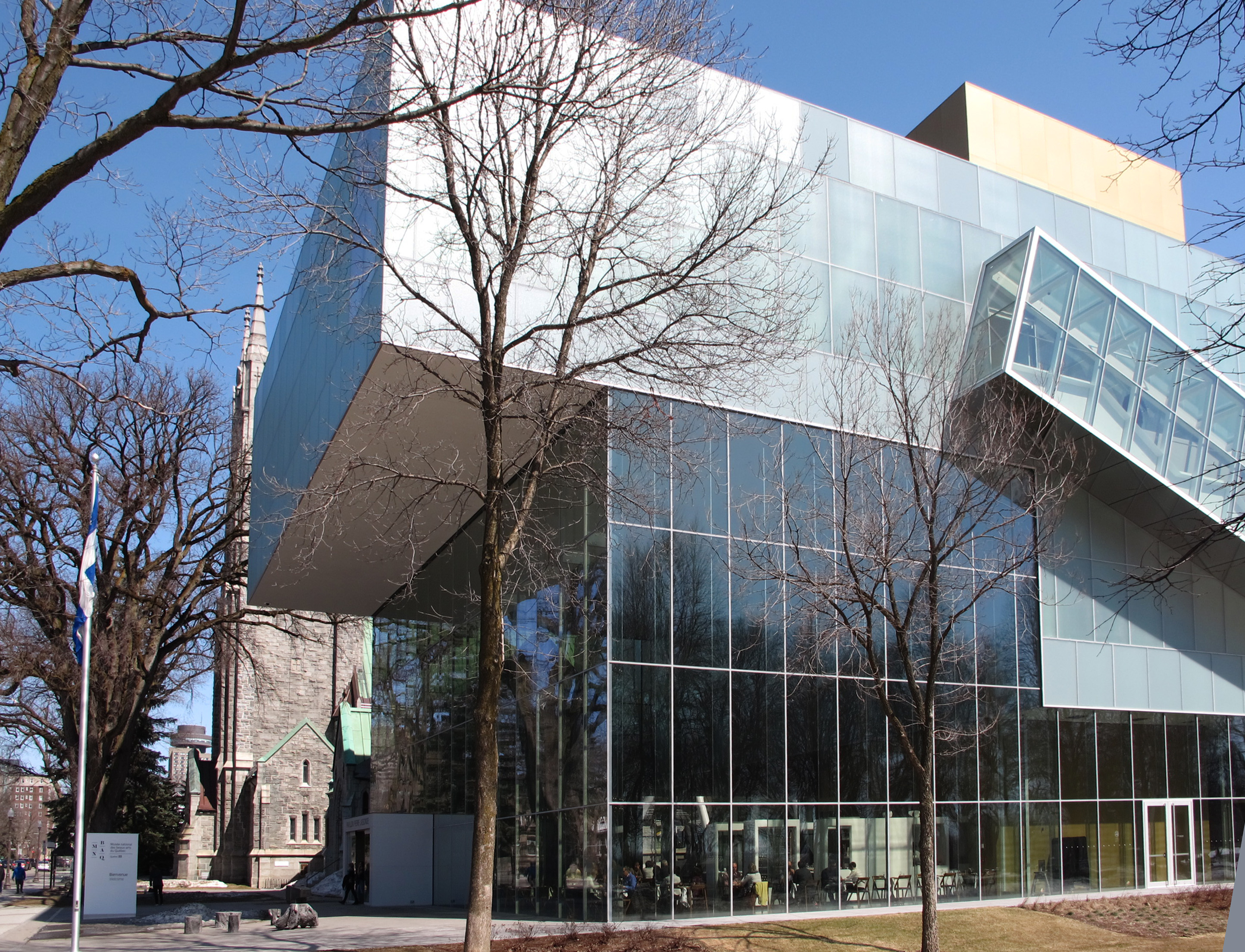
Pierre-Lassonde Pavillion in Quebec City

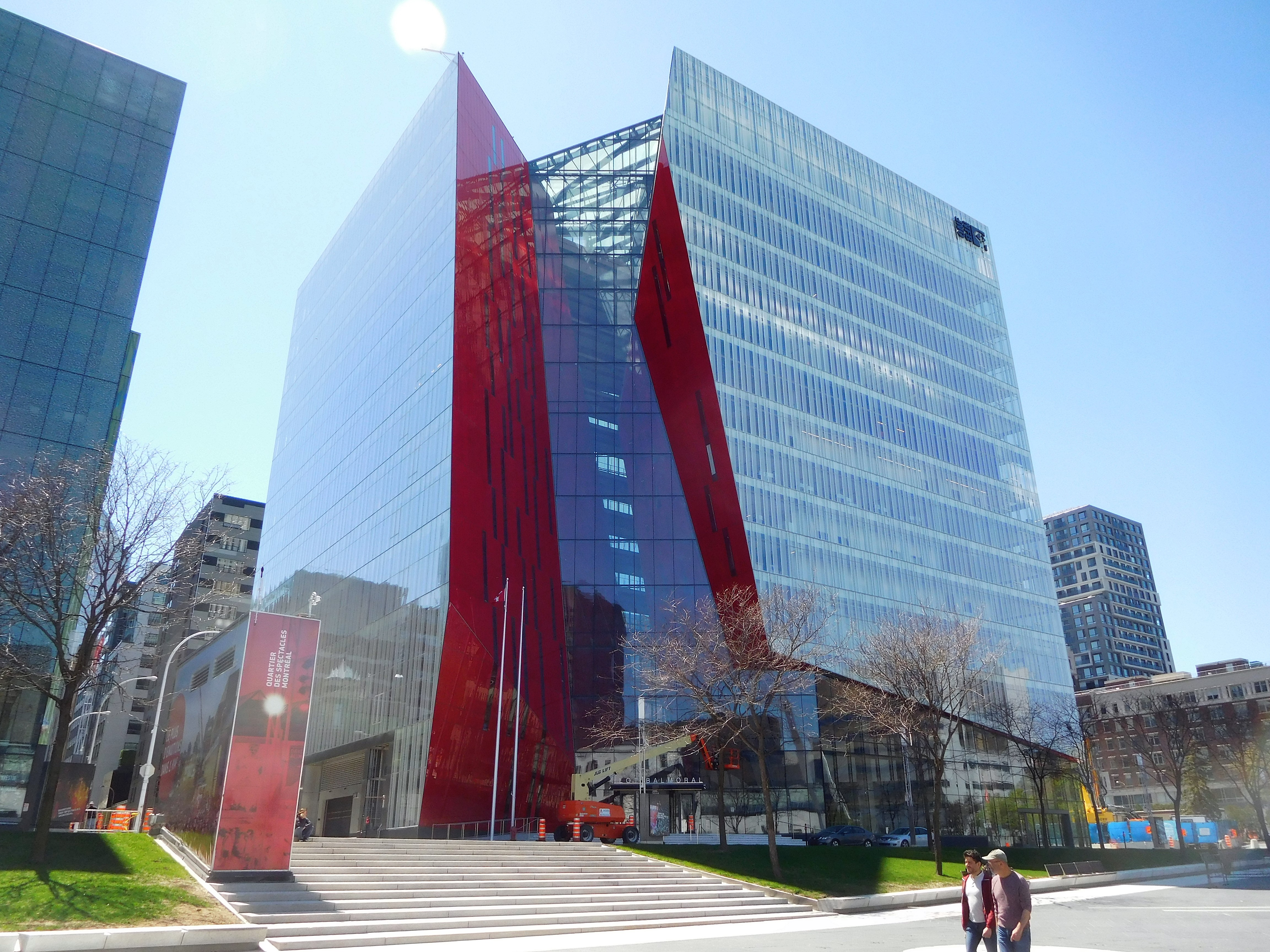
Ilôt Balmoral building in Montreal

He became known in the architecture world through the urban renewal project of the World Trade Centre Montreal. From there, his firm grew thanks to projects such as the J.- A. Desève Pavilion for the Université du Québec à Montréal (1998), the renovation of the Aéroport International Pierre-Elliott-Trudeau de Montréal (1999-2005), the Pavillon Joseph-Armand Bombardier (2004), the rehabilitation of the Montreal Tower (2015-2019), the Pavillon Pierre-Lassonde (2016), Îlot Balmoral (édifice) (2019), amongst many others. Under his influence, Provencher_Roy won the title of best firm of the year in architecture in Canada, awarded by the Royal Architectural Institute of Canada in 2015, as well as awards of excellence from the Governor General, the Canadian Architect and the Order of Architects of Quebec. In 2022, the Reception Pavilion of the Quebec National Assembly which he helped design won the Governor General's Medal in Architecture.

== Distinctions ==
- 2000 Fellow of the Royal Architectural Institute of Canada
- 2014 Fellow of the Royal Canadian Academy of Arts
- 2021 Knight of the National Order of Quebec
- 2023 Medal of Merit of the Ordre des architectes du Québec
- 2023 Gold Medal of the Royal Architectural Institute of Canada
