= Montreal Olympic pool =

Swimming venue in Montreal, Canada

Coordinates: 45°33′34″N 73°33′7″W

Olympic Pool
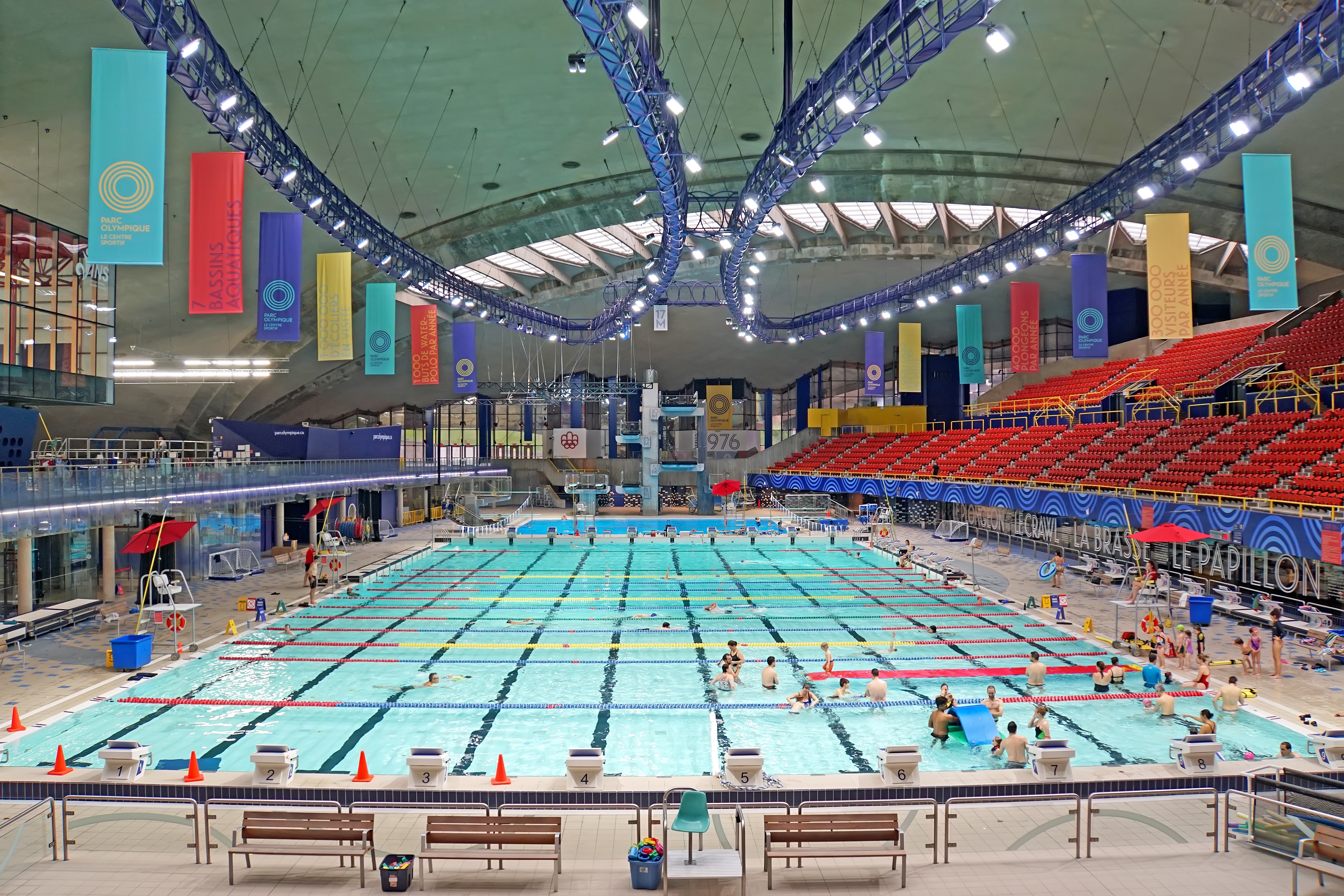
- Montreal's Olympic swimming pool
- Interactive map of Olympic Pool
- Full name: Olympic Pool
- Address: Montreal, Quebec, Canada
- Capacity: 3,012

Construction
- Architect: Roger Taillibert

The Montreal Olympic Pool was constructed for the 1976 Summer Olympics as part of the Montreal Olympic Park. The Olympic Pool is part of the larger swimming centre, located in the base of the inclined Montreal Tower. The centre has a spectator capacity of 3,012 seats.

At the 1976 Olympics, the venue hosted swimming, diving, water polo, and the swimming part of the modern pentathlon events. It had a capacity of 10,000 seats at the time (6,988 temporary seats were installed).

The pool was used as a filming venue for the Olympic-themed film Nadia, Butterfly.

== Construction ==
The building was designed by French architect Roger Taillibert, who also designed the Olympic Stadium and Olympic Village. The structure, along with the accompanying velodrome, inspired Taillibert's later designs for Luxembourg's National Sports and Culture Centre.

Outside of the actual aquatic complex, inside the tower, a small museum exists, commemorating the 1976 Games as well as Games past, with posters and displays in French and English.

== Renovation ==
During renovations in 2015, platforms at the heights of 15 metres and 18 metres were installed in the catwalks attached to the roof of the building. Two years after this, an additional platform was constructed at 20 metres. Diving from these platforms is restricted to individuals who are properly trained to dive at such heights. The 20 metre platform is believed to be one of the tallest indoor diving platforms in North America, if not the world.

== Gallery ==
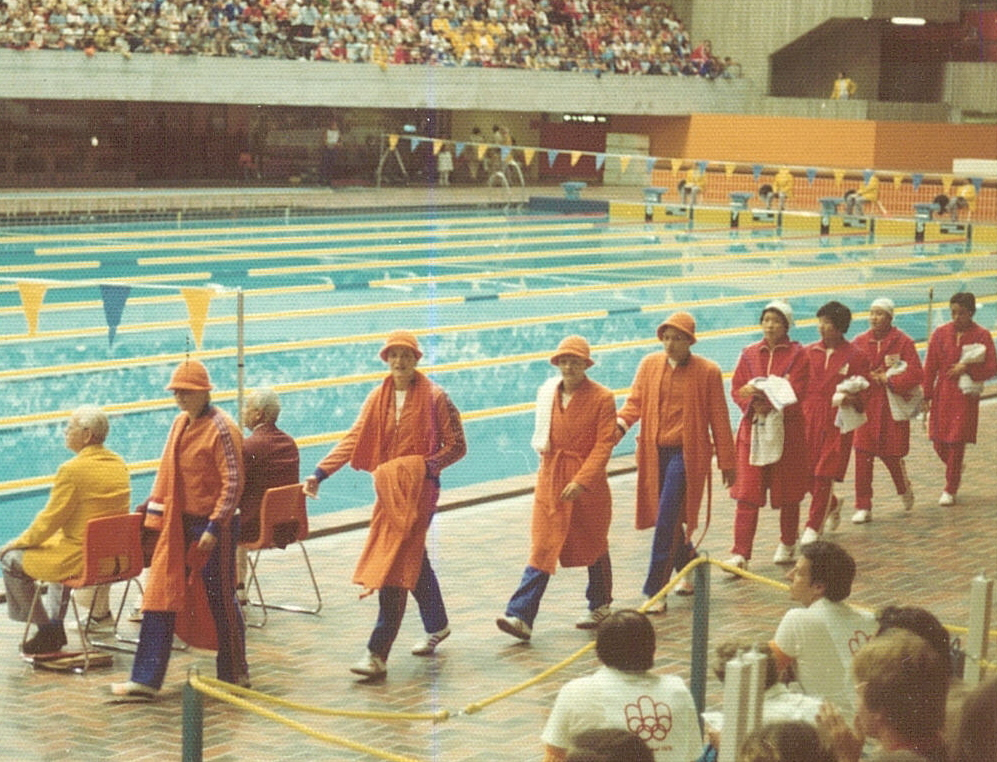
Inside the aquatics center during the 1976 Summer Olympics

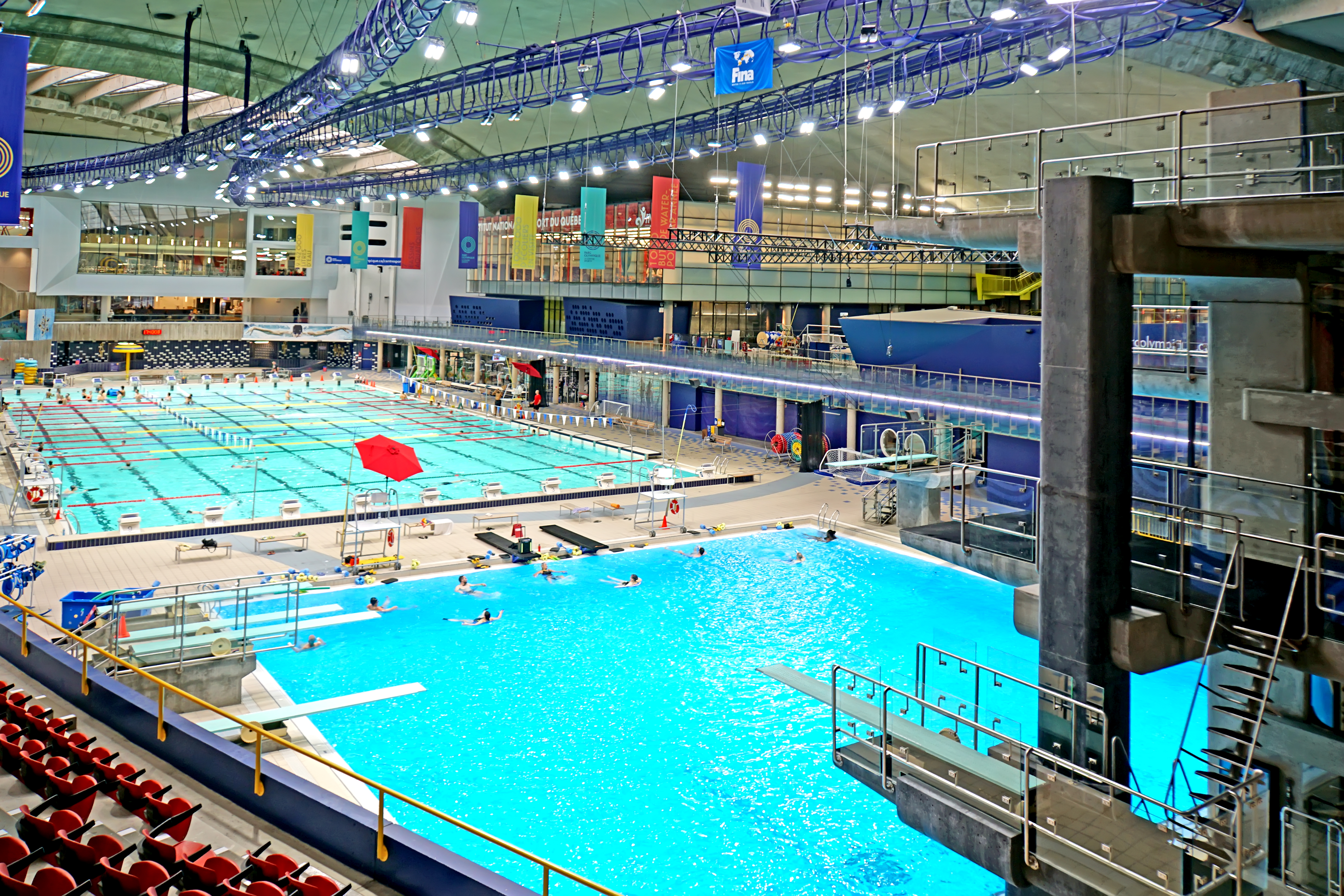
View of the diving and competition pool

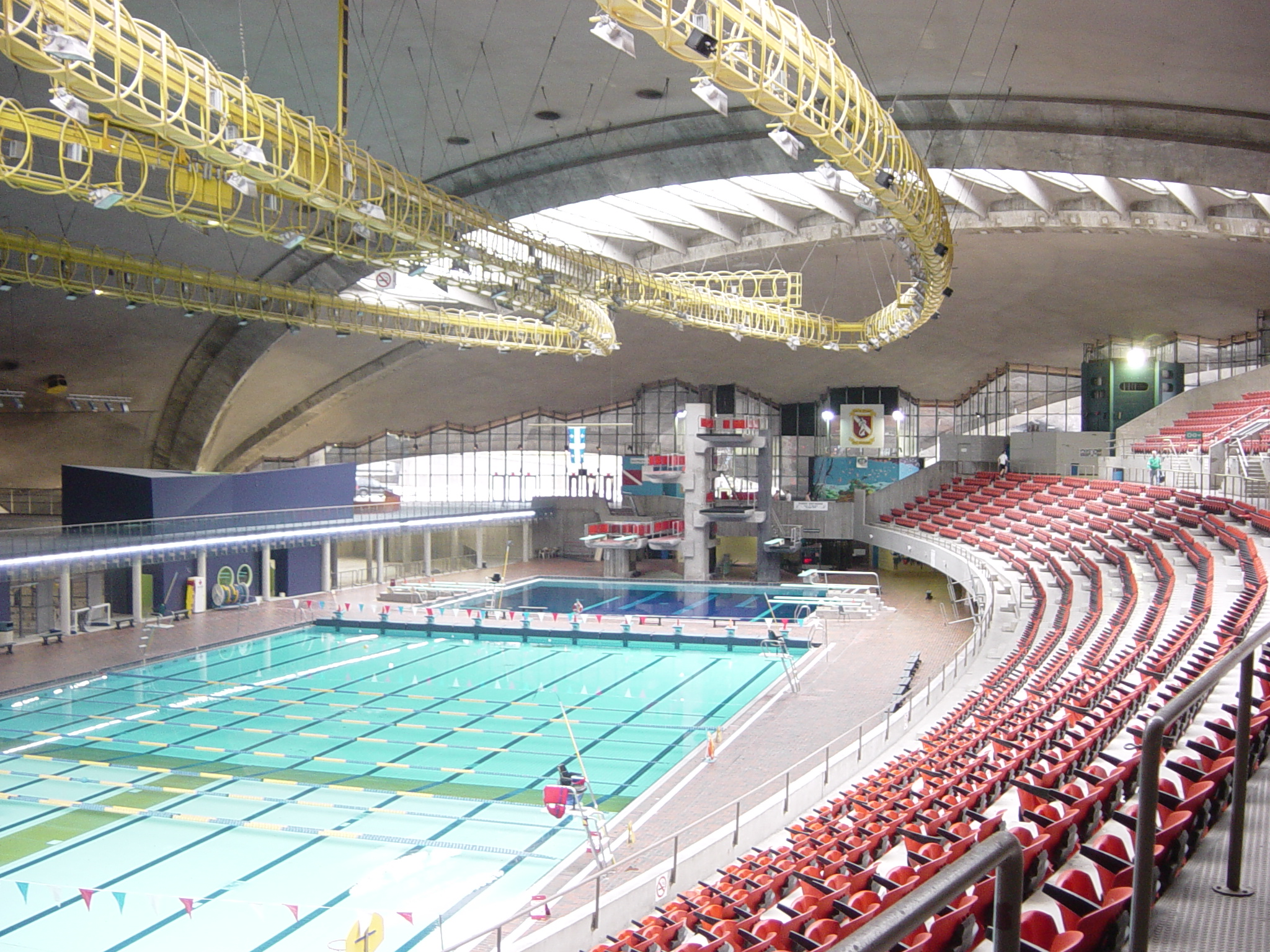
View from the stands

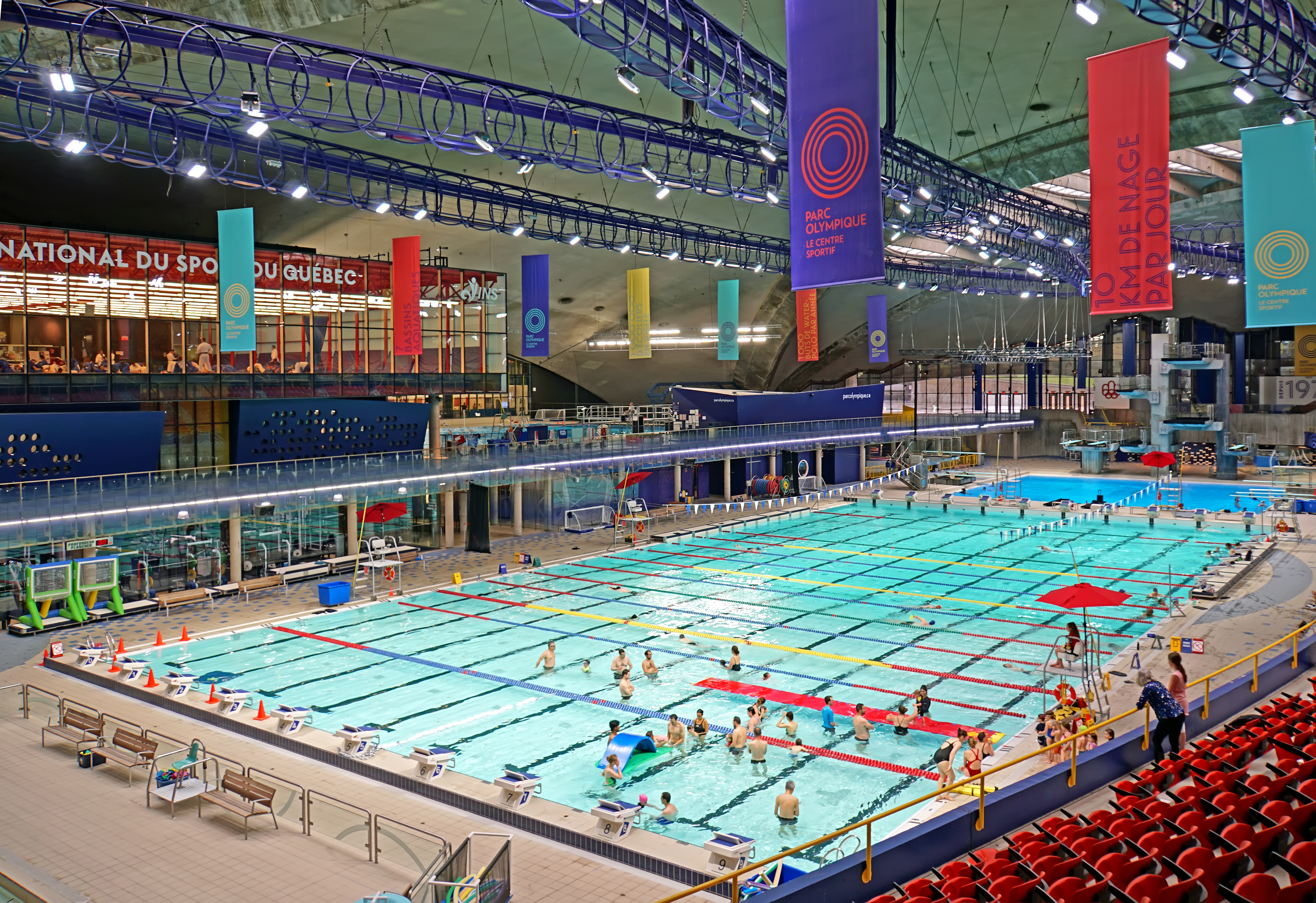
Inside the aquatics center in 2019

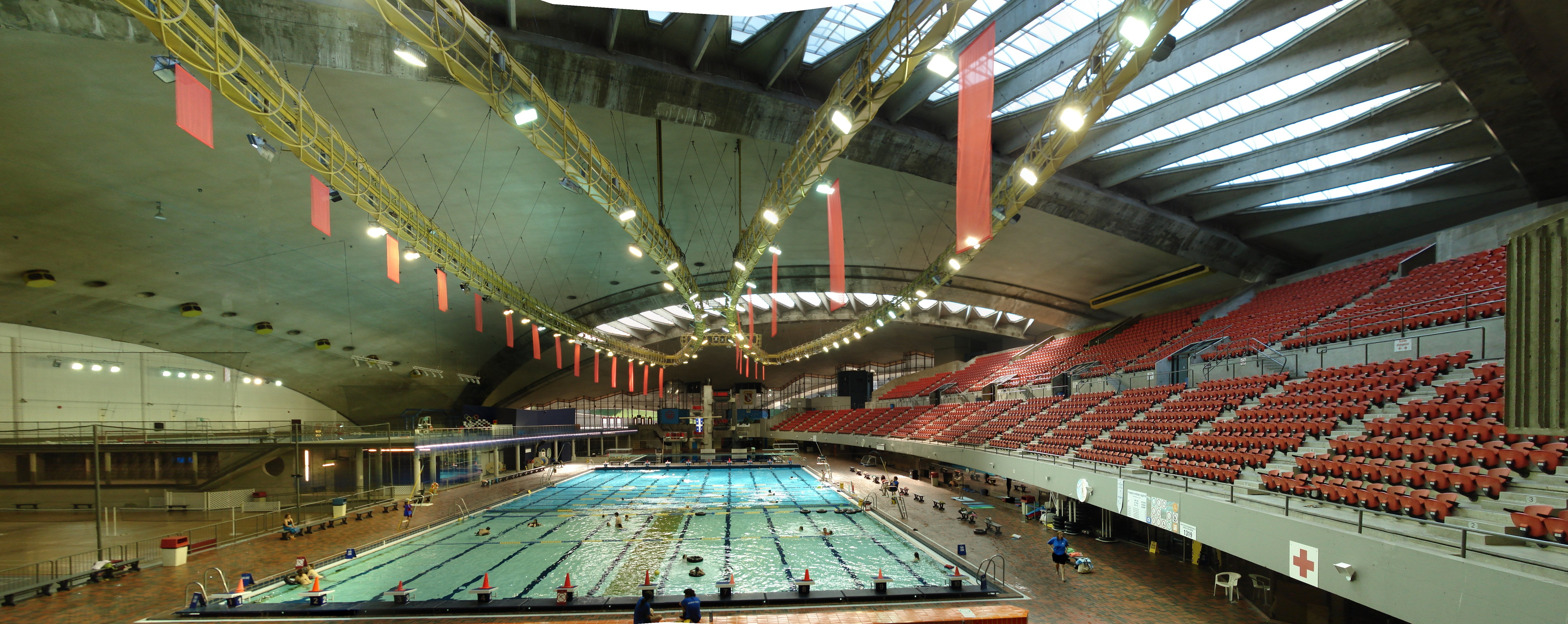
Panorama view of the pool

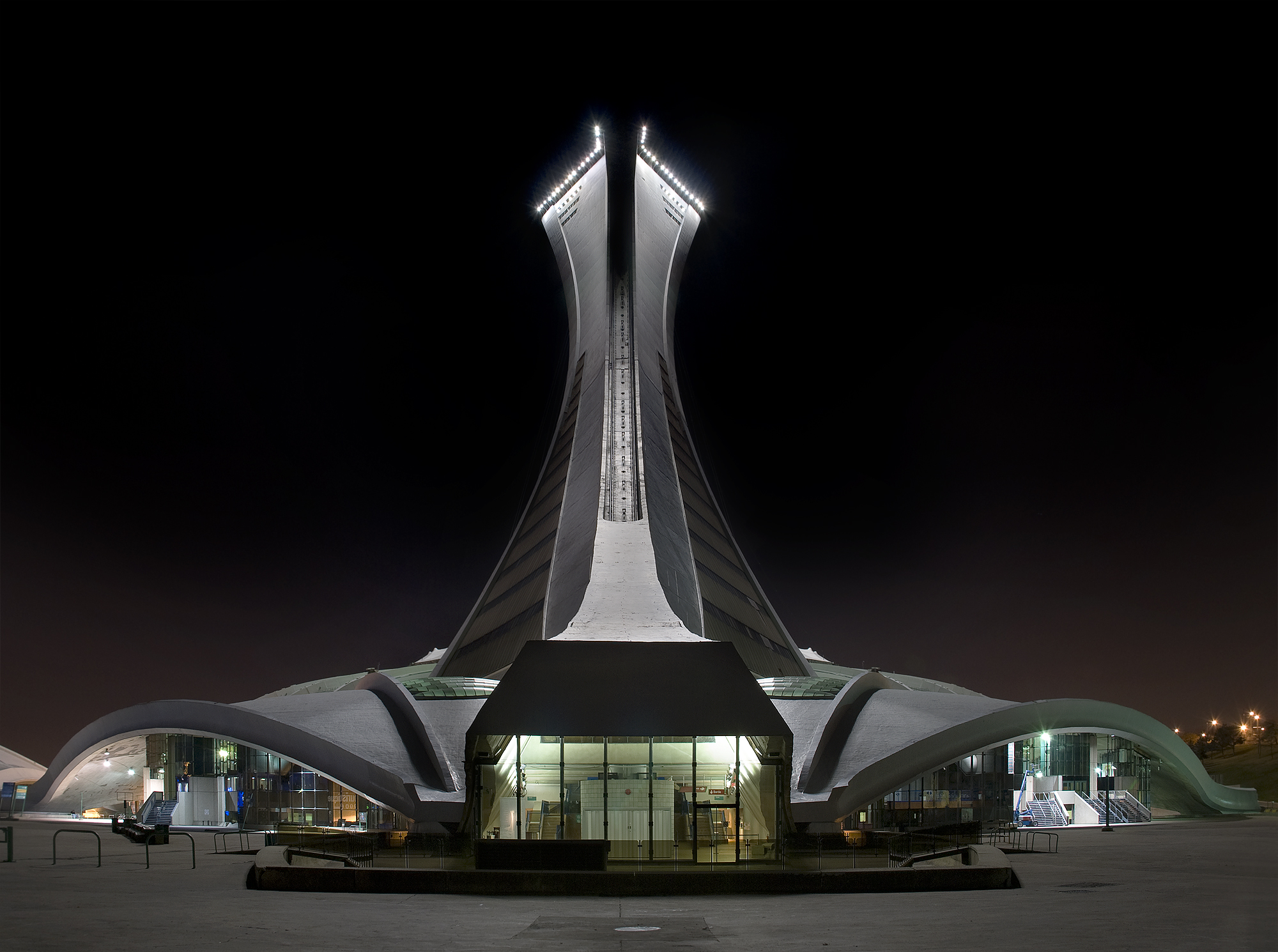
Entrance to the aquatics center at night
