= Provencher Roy =

Canadian architectural firm

Provencher_Roy
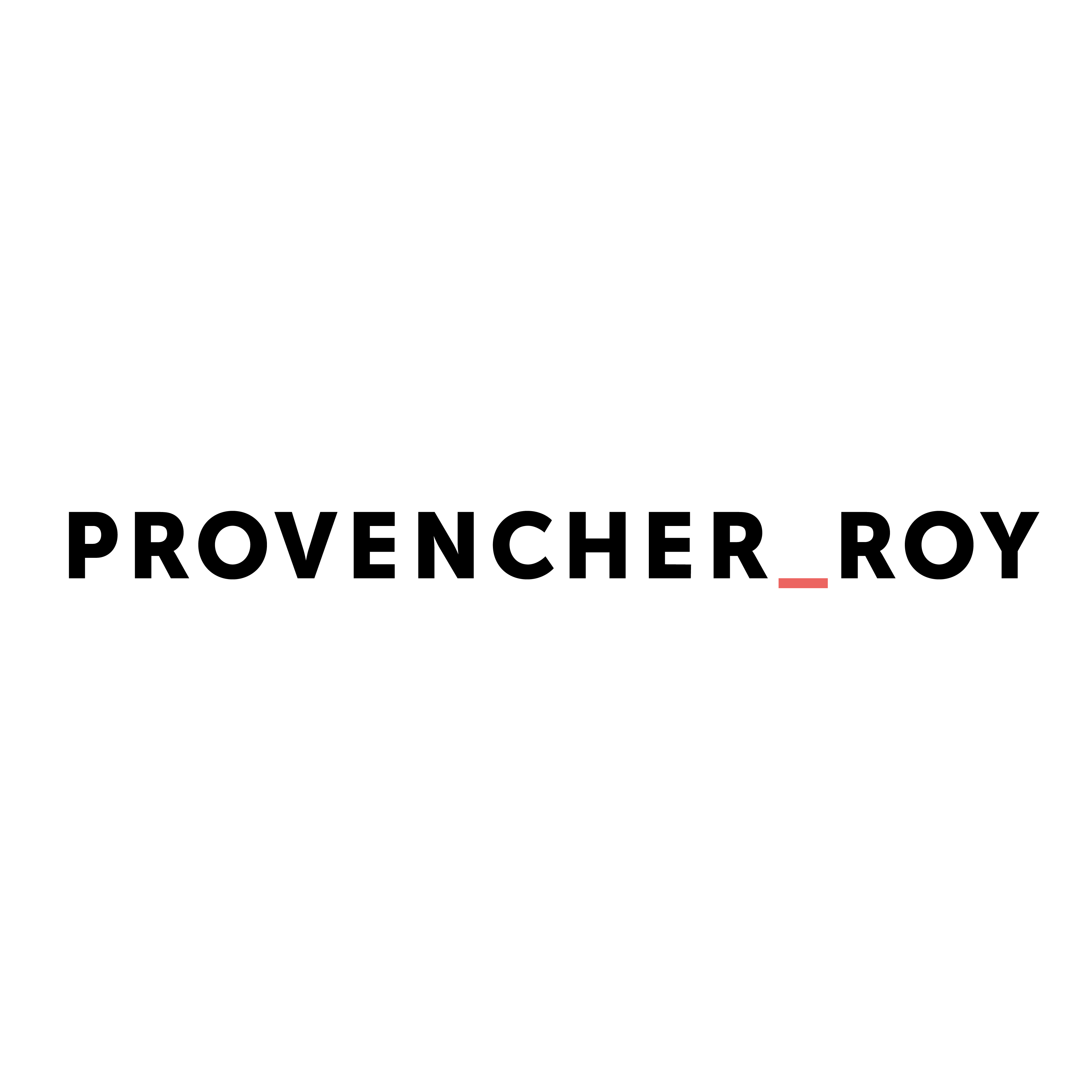
- Industry: Architecture
- Founded: 1983
- Founders: Claude Provencher; Michel Roy
- Headquarters: Montreal, Canada
- Website: https://provencherroy.ca/

Provencher Roy + Associés Architectes Inc. or Provencher_Roy (French pronunciation: [pʁovɑ̃ʃe ʁwa]) is a Canadian architectural firm founded in Montreal in 1983, by architects Claude Provencher (1949–2022) and Michel Roy.

== History ==
Claude Provencher and Michel Roy met in 1974 while working at Papineau Gérin-Lajoie Le Blanc, a Montréal-based architecture firm. They founded their own practice in 1983: Provencher Roy + Associés Architectes. Line Belhumeur and Alain Compéra were appointed as partners in the firm as work began on the Montréal World Trade Center in 1992: a revitalization project that would both breathe new life into the city's historic centre and establish the firm's reputation. In 2005, Provencher_Roy acquired Beauchamp Bourbeau, a firm specializing in sustainable development. Claude Bourbeau, the firm's principal, joined Provencher_Roy as an additional partner. In the same year, Provencher_Roy also bought a 50% stake in the interior design company Moureaux Hauspy et Associés Designers. The practice has continued its gradual growth since then, becoming a provider of multidisciplinary but complementary architectural services, including interior design, landscape architecture, urban planning and design, industrial design and sustainable development.

As of March 2022, the firm has appointed a total of thirty-three partners and become a predominately women-led design group.

Claude Provencher died in 2022.

== Design approach ==
Provencher_Roy works through a transdisciplinary strategy that links architecture, urban design and town planning, interior design and landscape design. According to the firm, its site-specific approach involves the exploration and analysis of a project's context: specifically, the physical, cultural, geographical, historical and economic constraints of a site.

Since its acquisition of Beauchamp Bourbeau, Provencher_Roy has increasingly focused on designing according to radical reuse: leveraging advances in 3D modeling, cloud-point scanning and sustainable environmental technologies to repurpose existing structures. The ethos of structural adaptation has informed the redevelopment of a Canadian Pacific Railway industrial complex in Montréal into a mixed-use, environmentally sustainable district; an under-used port in Québec into a public coastal park and cruise terminal fueled by shore power; the concrete Tour de Montréal into a glazed office building for the Desjardins Group; and the underground expansion and renovation of the Québec National Assembly to modernize its energy infrastructure and improve its accessibility while preserving its aesthetic and material heritage.

Much like their recent transformation of downtown Montréal into a pedestrian-friendly “cohesive urban landscape”, each project has used the brief of redevelopment as an opportunity to stitch spatially disparate neighborhoods together, attract pedestrian circulation and increase the amount of on-site vegetation. This is further evidenced by a whitepaper released following their participation in an initiative to redevelop the Bridge-Bonaventure and Pointe-du-Moulin sector of Montréal into a sustainable residential neighborhood.

== Selected work ==
- Montreal World Trade Center (1992)
- Aéroport international Pierre-Elliott-Trudeau de Montréal (1999–2005)
- Pavillon Joseph-Armand Bombardier (2004)
- Stade Saputo (2012)
- Claire and Marc Bourgie Pavilion of Quebec and Canadian Art (2012)
- Edifice Decelles Renovation (2013)
- Montreal Tower Conversion (2015–2019)
- Pavillon Pierre-Lassonde (2016)
- Champlain Bridge (2019)
- Hélène-Desmarais Building (2022)
- Îlot Balmoral (2020)
- Parliament Building National Assembly Welcome Pavilion (2020)
- MEM - Centre des Mémoires Montréalaises (2019)
- Philips Square (2022)

== Exhibitions ==
- “1 : X – Exploration Multidisciplinaire” (1:X - Multidisciplinary Exploration) Faculty of Environmental Design, University of Montréal, January 21 to February 27, 2016
- "L’architecture impliquée" (The implied Architecture) Laval University School of Architecture – April 19 to October 5, 2012
- “Montréal jamais construit!” (Never built Montréal!) Grande galerie de la MAQ, Montréal, from October 23, 2015, to February 14, 2016
- “Dessins à dessein” (Designed drawings) Grande galerie de la MAQ, Palais des Congrès, Montréal, from April 18 to August 11, 2013
- 1:26 In Study Model Wonderland from Halifax to Vancouver – ON TOUR Charles H. Scott Gallery in Vancouver, DX Toronto, June 9 to August 18, 2010

== Awards ==
- Royal Architectural Institute of Canada Architectural Firm of the Year Award (2015)
- Royal Architectural Institute of Canada National Urban Design Award (2016)
- CanBIM Design & Engineering Award (2017)
- Royal Architectural Institute of Canada Governor General's Medals in Architecture (2022)
