= Montreal Tower =

Building in Montreal, Canada

Coordinates: 45.5598°N 73.5522°W

Montréal Tower
- Tour de Montréal (French)
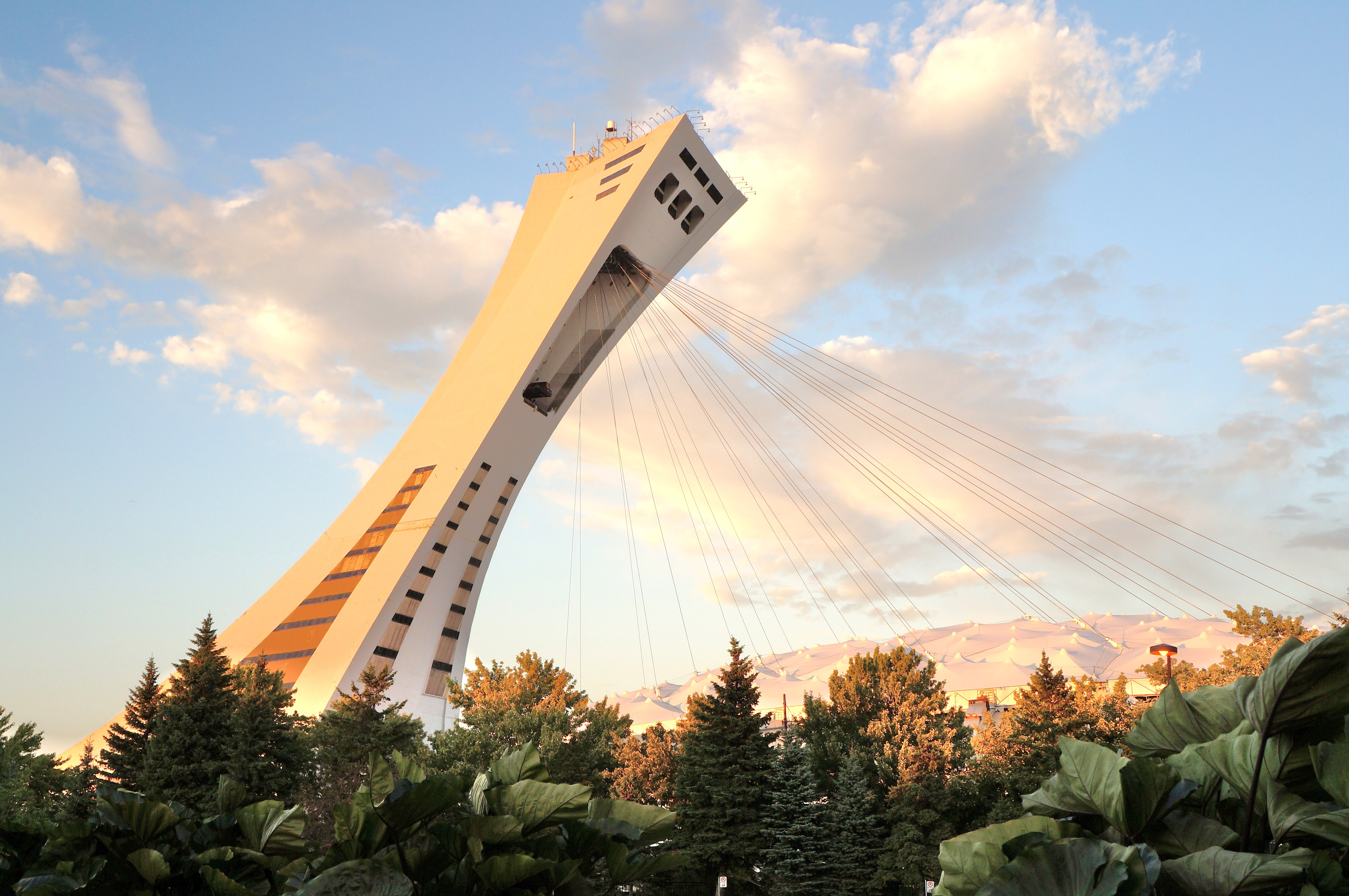
- Montréal Tower at sunset
- Former names: Olympic Tower (La Tour olympique)

General information
- Location: 3200 Viau St. Montreal, Quebec, Canada
- Opened: 21 November 1987

Montreal Tower (French: Tour de Montréal), formerly known as Olympic Tower (Tour olympique), is the tallest inclined structure in the world at 165 metres (541 ft), and the tenth tallest structure in Montreal, Canada. It forms part of the city's Olympic Stadium (Stade olympique) and Olympic Park (Parc Olympique). The cables that open the stadium's retractable roof are suspended from the tower.

Originally scheduled to be completed in time for the 1976 Summer Olympics, the tower reached its final height and was officially opened in 1987. It was designed by architect Roger Taillibert and leans at an angle of 45°, much larger than that of the Leaning Tower of Pisa (less than 4°).

The building's observatory is accessed by an inclined elevator; it showcases the history of the stadium, and the Olympics overall, including Caitlyn Jenner's (at the time Bruce Jenner) decathlon win. The Tower overlooks the Olympic Village, the Biodome, the Botanical Gardens and Saputo Stadium. At the base of the tower is the Olympic Park Sports Centre, home to elite training facilities.

In 2014, the name of the tower was changed from Olympic Tower to Montreal Tower. Between 2015 and 2019, the Olympic Installations Board spent $200 million to convert the building into an office tower, designed by Provencher Roy which housed more than 1,000 Desjardins Group employees as of 2019. This reconstruction was selected as an Honour winner in Architect's 2022 Architecture & Interior Awards in the Architecture: Adaptive Reuse category.

As of 2025, the tower is closed as part of the Olympic Park's renovation, and is set to reopen in the fall of 2027.
