= Space for Life =

Natural science museum district in Montreal, Canada

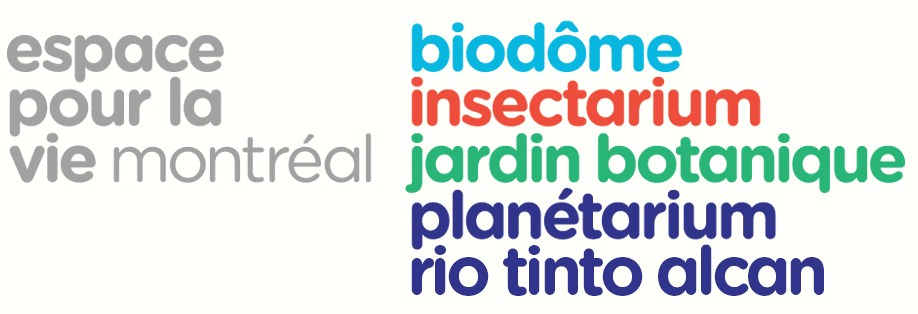

- Location within Montreal
- Location: 4101 rue Sherbrooke E Montreal, Quebec, Canada; H1X 2B2
- Coordinates: 45.5556°N 73.5555°W
- Public transit access: Pie-IX; Viau
- Website: Official website

Space for Life (French: Espace pour la vie) is a museum district in Montreal, Quebec, Canada. It consists of five natural museums: the Biosphere, Biodome, Planetarium, Botanical Garden and Insectarium.

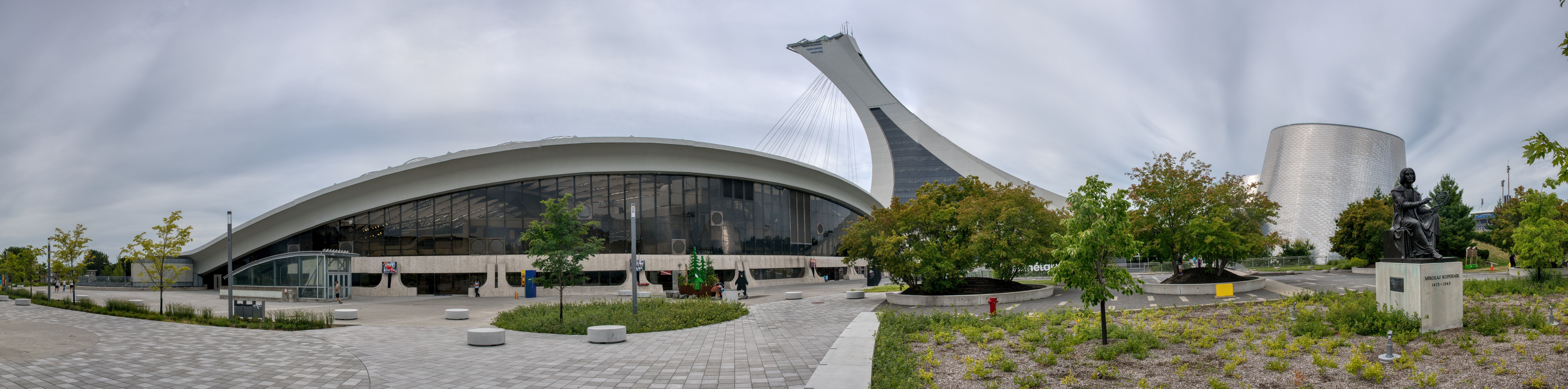
Space for life ( Biodome and Planetarium ), Montréal, 2024

Space for Life was established in 2011 as a successor body to Montreal Nature Museums. It describes itself as the largest natural sciences complex in Canada. As of 2013, its executive director is Charles-Mathieu Brunelle and Montreal executive committee member Manon Gauthier is responsible for its political oversight.

== See also ==
- Montreal Science Centre, a science museum in the Old Port
