= Viau station =

Montreal Metro station

Viau
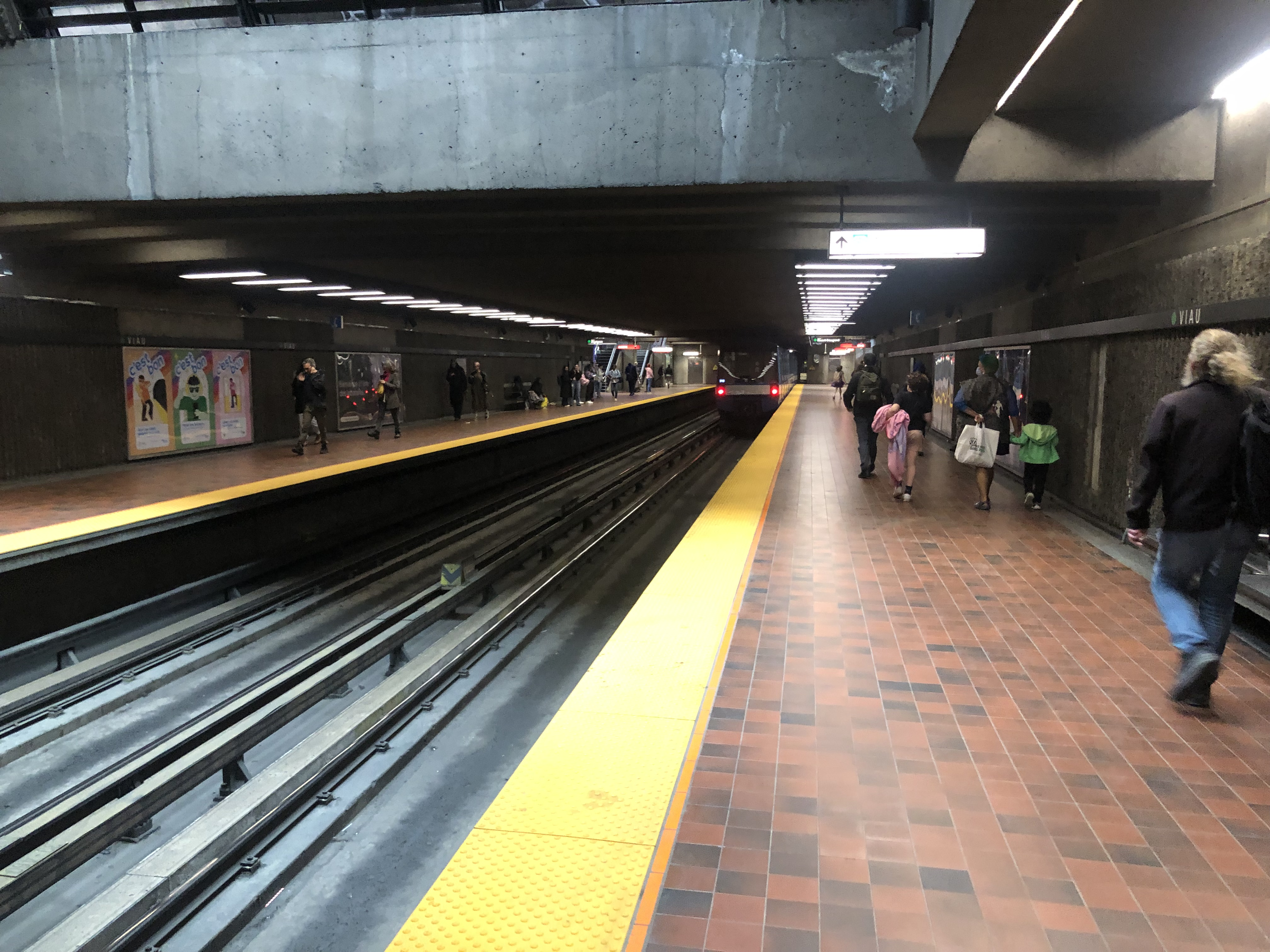

General information
- Location: 2855, av. Pierre-de Coubertin; Montreal, Quebec H1V 3V4; Canada
- Coordinates: 45°33′40″N 73°32′50″W
- Operator: Société de transport de Montréal
- Platforms: 2 side platforms
- Tracks: 2
- Connections: STM bus

Construction
- Depth: 4.6 metres (15 feet 1 inch), 60th deepest
- Accessible: Yes
- Architect: Irving Sager

Other information
- Fare zone: ARTM: A

History
- Opened: 6 June 1976

Passengers
- 2024: 2,701,472 ▲11.67%
- Rank: 39 of 68

Services
Preceding station	Montreal Metro	Following station
Pie-IX toward Angrignon	Green Line	Assomption toward Honoré-Beaugrand
Location

Viau station (French pronunciation: [vjo]) is a Montreal Metro station in the borough of Mercier–Hochelaga-Maisonneuve in Montreal, Quebec, Canada. It is operated by the Société de transport de Montréal (STM) and serves the Green Line. It is in the district of Hochelaga-Maisonneuve.

The station opened on June 6, 1976, as part of the extension of the Green Line to Honoré-Beaugrand station, in time for the 1976 Summer Olympics.

== Overview ==
Designed by architect Irving Sager, it is a normal side platform station built in a shallow open cut. The eastern end of the station is surmounted by the large station pavilion, which includes the ticket hall. There is no transept; stairs lead directly from the platforms to street level.

The eastern wall of the mezzanine is decorated by a non-figurative ceramic mural by Jean-Paul Mousseau, entitled Opus 74 and representing the Olympic flame and the tower of the Olympic Stadium.

=== Accessibility ===
In 2019, work to modernise the station, as well as expand the nearby underground workshop began. In November 2021, the station became the 19th accessible station in Montréal with the installation of elevators. Remaining work was completed in January 2022.

== Origin of the name ==
This station is named for rue Viau, named for local industrialist Charles-Théodore Viau, who purchased nearby tracts of land and developed them as a neighbourhood later named Viauville.

== Connecting bus routes ==
Société de transport de Montréal
No.	Route	Connects to	Service times / notes
34	Sainte-Catherine	Papineau	Daily
125	Ontario	McGill; Place-des-Arts; Frontenac	Daily
136	Viau		Daily
353 ☾	Lacordaire / Maurice-Duplessis	Frontenac	Night service

== Nearby points of interest ==
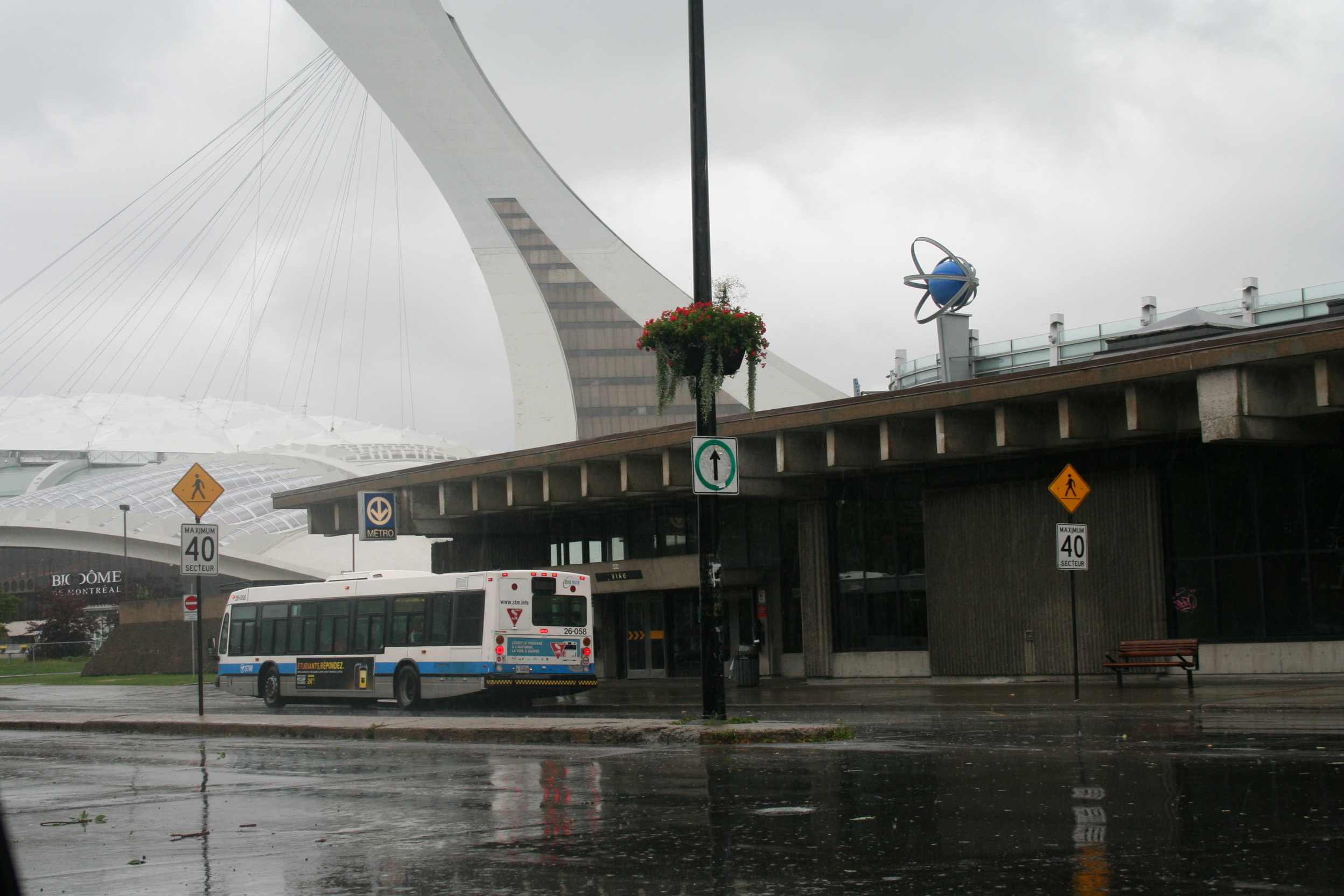
Entrance with the Olympic Stadium in the background

- Olympic Stadium - Montreal Tower, Centre de natation
- Biodome
- Rio Tinto Alcan Planetarium
- Saputo Stadium
- Aréna Maurice-Richard
- Starcité
- Centre Pierre Charbonneau
- Insectarium
- Parc Maisonneuve
- Olympic Village - Régie du logement
- Montreal Botanical Garden
