= Montreal Planetarium (2013) =

Planetarium in Montreal, Canada

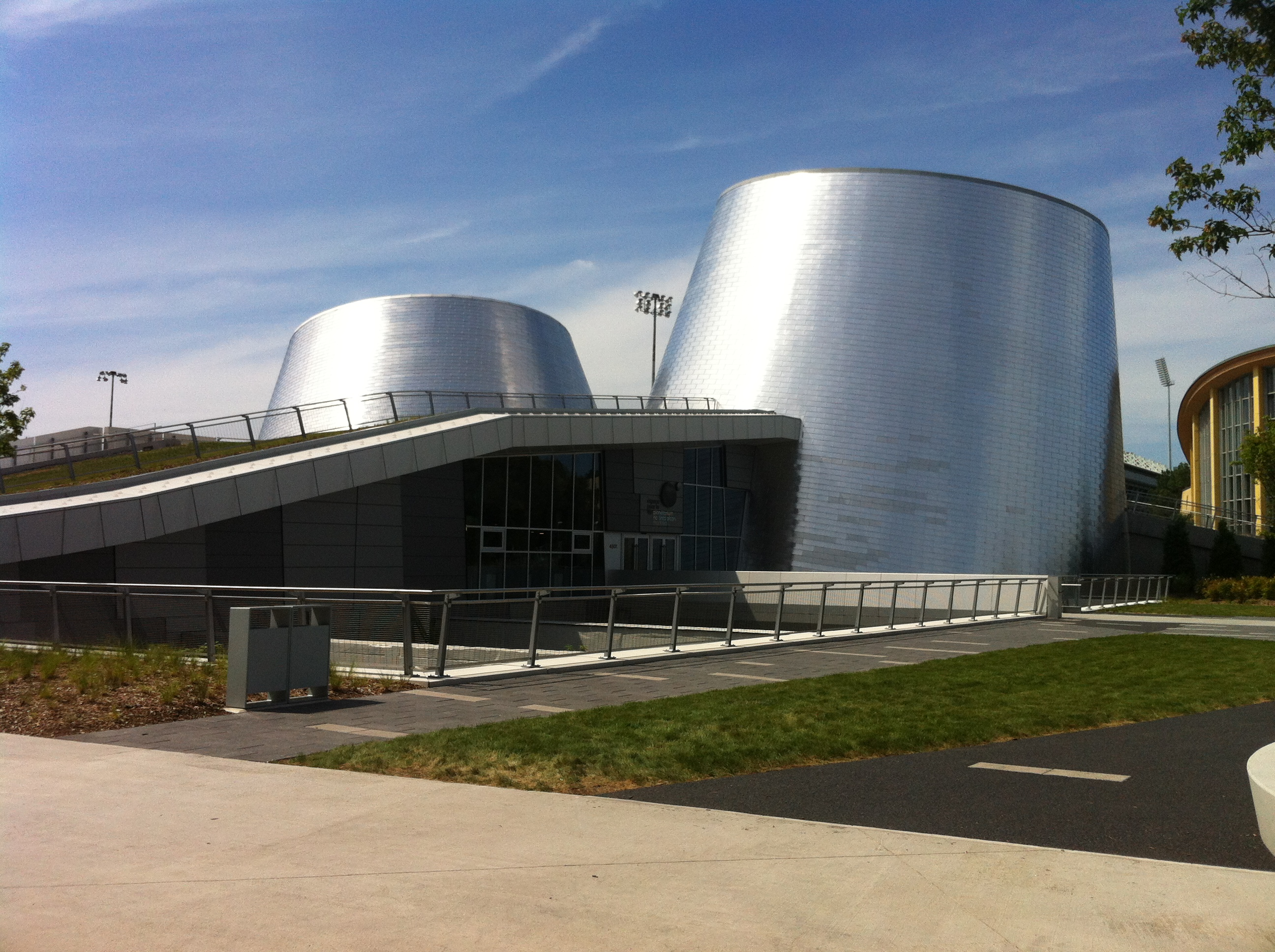

- Location of the Planetarium in Montreal
- Established: 6 April 2013
- Location: 4801, avenue de Pierre-de Coubertin; Montreal, Quebec; H1V 3V4
- Coordinates: 45.5607°N 73.5507°W
- Type: Planetarium
- Owner: Space for Life
- Public transit access: at Viau; Viau station
- Parking: 3000 Viau Street
- Website: espacepourlavie.ca/en/planetarium

The Montreal Planetarium (formerly Rio Tinto Alcan Planetarium) is a planetarium located in the Space for Life, near the Olympic Stadium and the Biodome in Montreal, Quebec, Canada. It is the successor to the Dow Planetarium, closed in 2011. The new installation has two separate theatres as well as exhibits on space and astronomy. It was officially opened in April 2013.

== The planetarium ==
The building, designed by Cardin + Ramirez et Associés, Architectes, is certified as LEED Platinum.

The planetarium is part of the Space for Life museum complex, a cluster of museums focusing on nature. Sustainable development is a focus for the Space for Life, as reflected in the planetarium's architecture and its status as a LEED Platinum certified building. Constructed of aluminum and concrete, the building contains an exhibition area and two dome theatres named "Chaos" and "Milky Way". Artistic direction was by Michel Lemieux and Victor Pilon.

Visitors choose one of two programs, then view two presentations, one in each theatre. One presentation focuses on the science of astronomy while the other presents a more artistic view of space. There is also an exhibition area with exhibits on meteorites and an area, Exo, which uses touchscreen panels to discuss the origin of life and the possibility of life on other worlds (exobiology). All exhibits and presentations are in French and English.

=== Shows ===
A 40-minute presentation about the aurora borealis, Aurōrae, combines images of the Northern Lights with music and live commentary by the planetarium's science interpreters. The origin of the phenomenon is described. A team from the planetarium gathered over 179,000 images in March 2015 in Yellowknife. At that location, light pollution is low and the aurora is visible, on average, 240 nights per year.

Other films shown at the planetarium, some presented with live commentary, include the American Museum of Natural History's Dark Universe and National Geographic's Asteroid: Extreme Mission.

The theatres' multimedia is controlled using a Digistar 7 projection and content system. The Milky Way Theatre features six Sony VPL-GTRZ270 projectors and a Konica Minolta Infinium S starball. The Chaos Theatre features four Christie D4k40-RGB projectors.

== See also ==
- Nicolaus Copernicus Monument, Montreal
