= Maisonneuve Park =

Urban park in Montreal, Canada

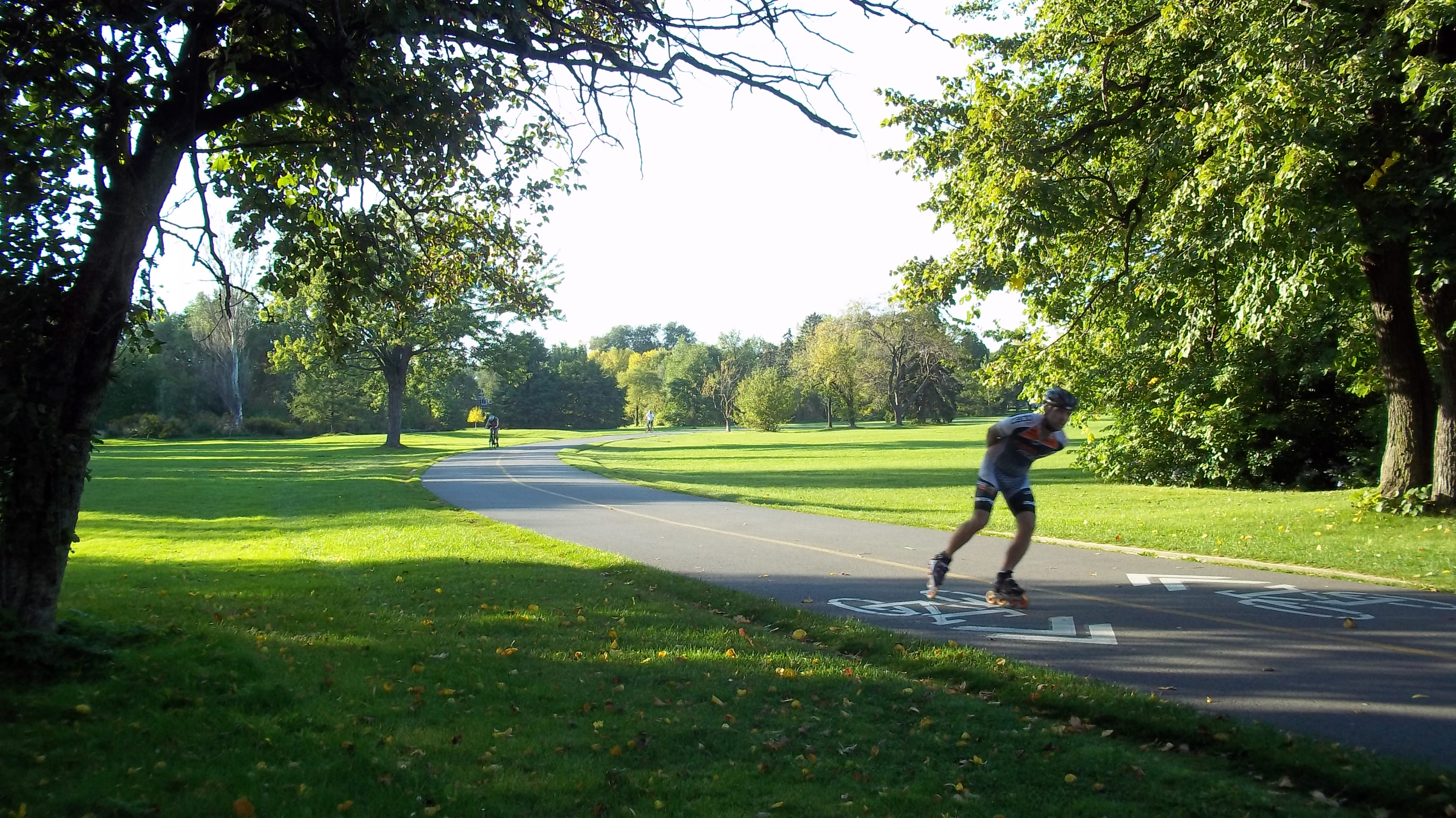
- A path in the park
- Interactive map of Maisonneuve Park
- Type: Urban park
- Location: Rosemont–La Petite-Patrie, Montreal, Quebec, Canada
- Coordinates: 45°33′42″N 73°33′43″W
- Area: 80 hectares (200 acres)
- Created: 1910
- Operator: City of Montreal
- Open: 6:00 a.m. to 12:00 a.m.
- Status: Open all year
- Public transit: STM Bus: 136, 185, 197
- Website: Parc Maisonneuve

Maisonneuve Park is an urban park in the Rosemont–La Petite-Patrie borough of Montreal, Quebec, Canada. It is considered to be one of Montreal's large parks.

Established in 1910, it is 80 hectares (200 acres) in size, in three sections. The primary section is a public space that is bordered by the Montreal Botanical Garden on the west, Rosemont Street to the north, Viau Street to the east, and Sherbrooke Street East to the south. The other two sections, east of Viau Street, are a nine-hole public golf course and a community garden. Originally the primary section contained an 18-hole golf course which was reduced to 9 holes in the mid-1970s in order to construct the Montreal Olympic Park.

It is named in honour of Paul Chomedey de Maisonneuve, founder of Montreal.

The park is a unique place where people enjoy walking day or night, bicycling on its bike trail which runs all the way around the park. The center of the park is a calm area where people enjoy picnics and tranquility and is very popular among young people and families.

The loop section of the bicycle path is 3.1 kilometres (1.9 mi) long. This does not include the path outside the fenced area, along Sherbrooke Street.

A herd of sheep live at le Repaire de Biquette, in Maisonneuve Park

It has been the site for Montreal's annual Saint-Jean-Baptiste Day concert on June 24, but in 2015 the festivities were held in the Place des Festivals instead.
