= Roger Taillibert =

French architect (1926–2019)

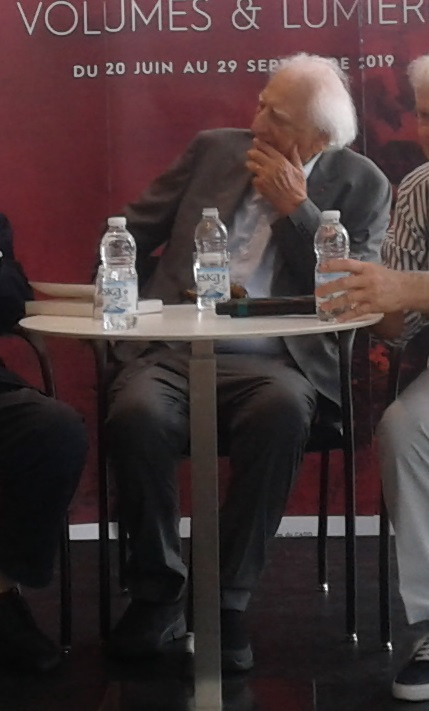
- Taillibert in 2019
- Born: Roger Taillibert; 21 January 1926; Châtres-sur-Cher, France
- Died: 3 October 2019 (aged 93); Paris, France
- Occupation: Architect
- Buildings: Montreal Biodome; Olympic Stadium; Parc des Princes

Roger Taillibert (French pronunciation: [ʁɔʒe tajibɛʁ]; 21 January 1926 – 3 October 2019) was a French architect, active as a designer from about 1963 to 1987.

Taillibert was notable for designing the Parc des Princes in Paris and the Olympic Stadium in Montreal, Quebec, Canada.

== Biography ==
Taillibert was born in Châtres-sur-Cher. He was honored by the French government as commander of the Légion d'Honneur, commander of the Ordre National du Mérite, commander of the Ordre des Palmes Académiques and commander of the Ordre des Arts et des Lettres.

== Portfolio ==
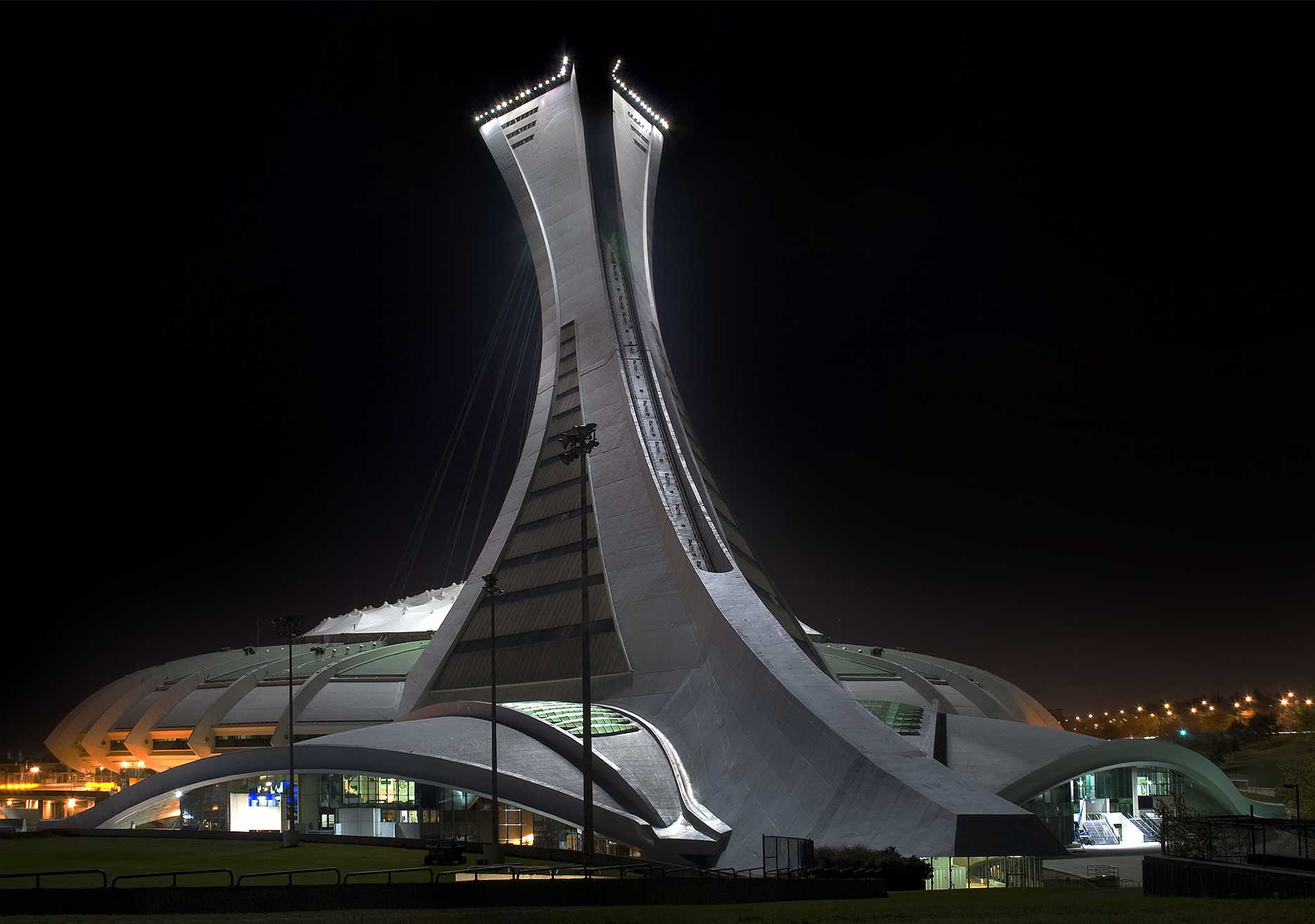
Montreal's Olympic Stadium

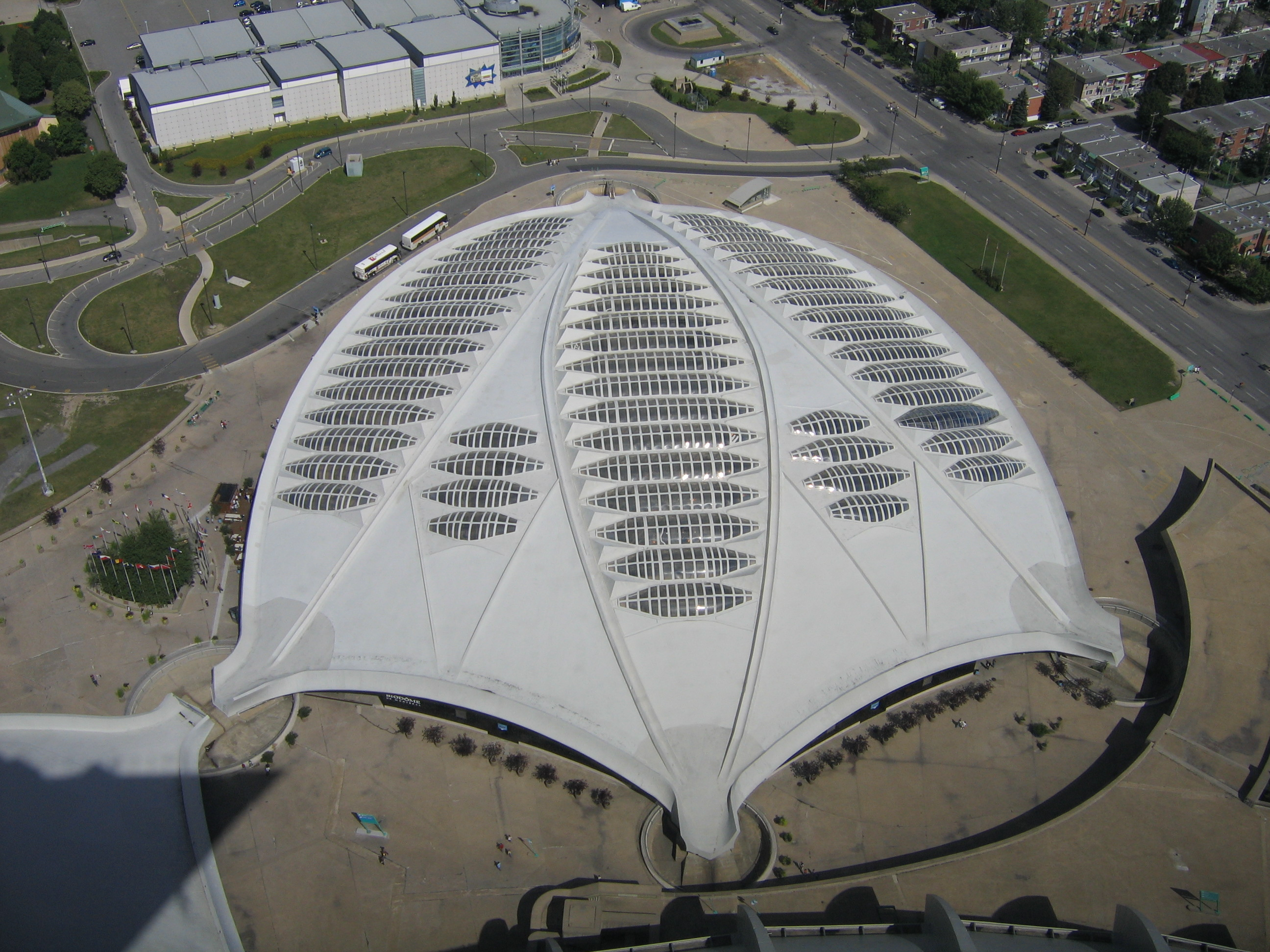
The Montreal Olympic Velodrome (1976)

- Pôle sportif et culturel Chamonix Nord
- Parc des Princes in Paris
- Stadium Lille-Metropole in Lille
- Olympic Stadium in Montreal, Quebec, Canada
- Olympic Velodrome, Montreal (now called the Montreal Biodome)
- Olympic Pool (Montreal)
- ASPIRE Academy, Qatar
- Armed Forces Officer's Club and Hotel, Abu Dhabi, UAE
- National Sports and Culture Centre, (widely known as d'Coque), Luxembourg City, Luxembourg
