= Montreal Biodome =

Sporting arena in Montreal, Quebec

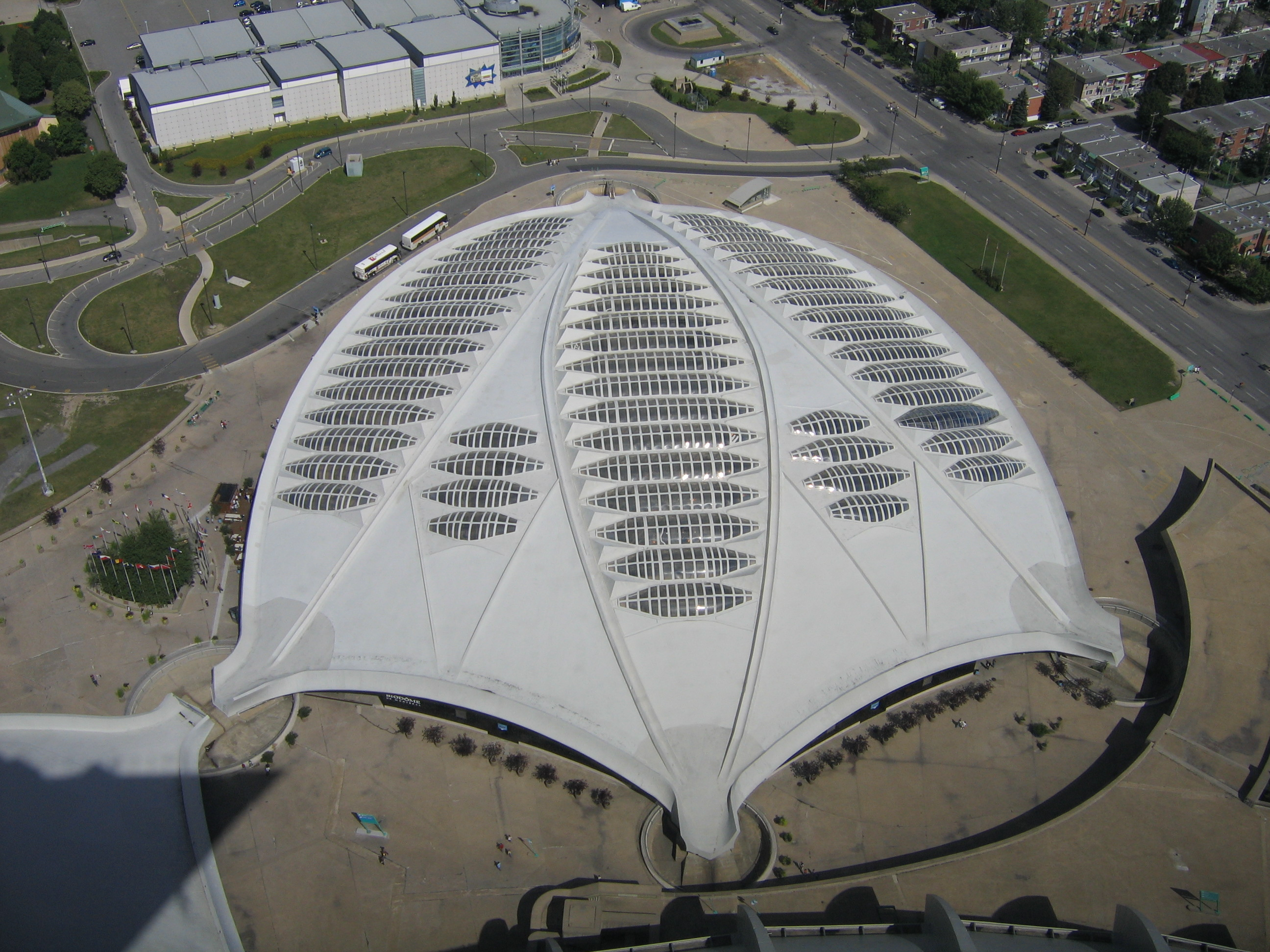
- View from the tower of the Olympic Stadium
- Interactive map of Montreal Biodome
- 45°33′35″N 73°32′59″W
- Date opened: April 1976 (Velodrome); June 19, 1992 (Biodome)
- Location: 4777 Pierre-de Coubertin avenue Montreal, Quebec; H1V 1B3
- No. of animals: 4802 (excluding invertebrates); 1500 plants
- No. of species: 229 animal (excluding invertebrates), 750 plant
- Annual visitors: 815,810 (2011)
- Memberships: AZA, CAZA
- Public transit: Viau; STM bus
- Website: espacepourlavie.ca/en/biodome

The Montreal Biodome (French: Biodôme de Montréal) is a museum of enclosed ecosystems located at Olympic Park in the Mercier–Hochelaga-Maisonneuve borough of Montreal, Quebec, Canada, that allows visitors to walk through replicas of five ecosystems found in the Americas: Tropical rainforest, Laurentian maple forest, a Gulf of St. Lawrence estuary, Labrador Coast, and Sub-Antarctic Islands.

It is one of two large-scale enclosed ecosystem structures in the Western Hemisphere, the other being Biosphere 2 in Oracle, Arizona, United States. However, unlike the latter, the Montreal Biodome was designed primarily as a museum, resembling but fundamentally different from a closed ecological system such as Biosphere 2. The key mission of the Biodome is conservation.

The building was originally constructed for the 1976 Olympic Games as a velodrome (cycling stadium) with 2,600 seats. It hosted both track cycling and judo events. Renovations on the building began in 1989 and in 1992 the indoor nature exhibit was opened.

The Montreal Biodome is one of five facilities that make up the largest natural science museum complex in Canada, Space for Life, which also includes the Montreal Insectarium, Montreal Botanical Garden, the biosphere and Rio Tinto Alcan Planetarium. It is an accredited member of both the Association of Zoos and Aquariums (AZA) and Canada's Accredited Zoos and Aquariums (CAZA) association.

== History ==
The building was designed by French architect Roger Taillibert as part of his larger plan for an Olympic park that included the Montreal Olympic Stadium and the Olympic pool. The venue was a combined velodrome and judo facility. Construction of the building began in August 1973, and the facility was officially opened in April 1976.

In 1988, a feasibility study was conducted for converting the velodrome into a biodome. Pierre Bourque, then the mayor of Montreal, was inspired to develop the site after he helped organized the Floralies Internationales de Montréal, a horticultural exhibition that was also hosted in the former velodrome. Construction started in 1989, and the facility was opened to the public on June 18, 1992, as the Montreal Biodome.

In the summer of 2003, the Biodome installed an audio guide system that lets visitors get information about what they are viewing, and also provides statistics to the facility about what the visitors find most interesting. Visitors can rent a receiver programmed to receive French, Spanish, or English for adults, or French or English for children.

=== Renovation ===
In October 2015, it was announced that both the Biodome and the Insectarium would be closing for renovations from September 2016 to December 2017, as part of the city of Montreal's 375th anniversary. In August 2016, however, the mayor of Montreal cancelled the contract to renovate the Biodome, because the bids received by the city were much higher than the initial estimates. The project went back to a bidding process. The Biodome closed for renovations on April 2, 2018. The reopening was pushed back from September 2019 to December 2019, and then to the spring of 2020 due to a shortage of supplies and specialized labourers. The COVID-19 pandemic caused additional delays, and the Biodome finally reopened to the public on August 31, 2020.

During the Biodome's two-year renovation process, 76 animals died. Many of the Biodome's animals had to be moved to different enclosures during this period. According to Biodome officials, a weasel infiltrated the bird enclosure and killed many birds, and the mesh used in a temporary bat enclosure injured many of the bats, around 50 of which did not survive. Other animal deaths were caused by a disease outbreak among a different group of birds; a monkey and a small penguin also died for reasons unknown. To mitigate harm to other animals, the Biodome decided not to bring back four king penguins who had been transferred to the Calgary Zoo during renovations.

Major changes during the renovation included the release of a mobile app, offering augmented reality features and more in-depth information about the different plants and animals. There are also new walkways in the Tropical Rainforest and Laurentian Maple Forest and an ice tunnel that leads into the Sub-Antarctic Islands. A new upper mezzanine, which features a permanent exhibition offering a behind-the-scenes glimpse into the workings of the Biodome, also allows for a view into three of the ecosystems.

== Exhibits ==
The facility allows visitors to walk through replicas of five ecosystems found in the Americas: the Tropical Rainforest, the Gulf of St. Lawrence, the Laurentian Maple Forest, the Labrador Coast, and the Sub-Antarctic Islands.

=== Tropical Rainforest ===
This replica of the South American rainforest is housed in the Aisha-Savoie-Weider Gallery, named in memory of Aisha Savoie-Weider after a donation from her family. This is the largest ecosystem in the Biodome, occupying an area of 2,600 square metres. The temperature and humidity within are significantly higher than in the rest of the space, and usually higher than in the rest of the city of Montreal; daytime temperatures range from 25 to 28 degrees celsius and the humidity is kept at 70 to 80%. This is also the most heavily populated ecosystem, with many fish, amphibian, reptile, bird, and mammal species, including capybaras, emperor tamarins, blue-and-yellow macaws, and tropical gar.

=== Laurentian Maple Forest ===
This exhibit resembles a typical Quebec maple forest, similar to those in La Mauricie National Park, with a mix of deciduous and coniferous trees. Within its 1,500 square metres, there are both terrestrial and aquatic habitats, home to mammals, fish, reptiles, amphibians, and birds. This replica shifts with the seasons to replicate the cycle of a real forest. This ecosystem is also used for conservation purposes, with a particular focus on three animals (wood turtle, copper redhorse, and chorus frog) and two plants (wild garlic and five-leaf ginseng).

=== Gulf of St. Lawrence ===
A view of the Gulf of St. Lawrence exhibit from a floor above.

This mostly aquatic habitat is an estuary modelled on the Gulf of Saint Lawrence, similar to Quebec's North Shore or Gaspé Peninsula. Most of the species in this exhibit are fish, mollusks, crustaceans, and echinoderms, but there are also a few species of seabirds. There are 2.5 million litres of salinated water, created to resemble seawater and produced onsite, within the 1,600 square metres of aquariums and other sites.

=== Labrador Coast ===
This exhibit is a single landscape that resembles the Atlantic coast of eastern Canada and contains just two species of birds: the murre and the puffin. The exhibit is in the same larger room as the Sub-Antarctic Islands.

=== Sub-Antarctic Islands ===
This is an enclosed habitat similar to the Labrador Coast. It contains four species of penguins from the southern tip of Argentina and provides visitors the ability to observe the penguins both on land and in the water.

== Scientific contributions ==
=== Discoveries ===
Two new species have been discovered living in the Biodome: the acarian Copidognathus biodomus in the simulated estuary in 1996, and the bacterium Nitratireductor aquibiodomus in the water reprocessing system in 2003.

In 2000, a new type of hybrid bird, the result of intergeneric breeding between a black-and-white warbler and a yellow-rumped warbler, was observed at the Biodome.

=== Conservation ===
The Biodome is one of the only zoos that has a successful rockhopper penguin breeding program. They have previously run a captive breeding program for barndoor skates.

Currently, the Biodome's research and conservation teams are focused on three vulnerable animal species, all found in the Laurentian Maple Forest ecosystem: the wood turtle, the Western chorus frog, and the copper redhorse.

The wood turtle is the most terrestrial freshwater turtle in Quebec. This species is threatened by habitat loss, road traffic, and poaching. The conservation program exists in partnership with the Quebec government and is a captive breeding program to allow for young turtles to be raised in captivity and then released into the natural environment once they have survived the most dangerous phase of their development.

The Western chorus frog is vulnerable in Quebec due to the degradation of its natural habitat. The Biodome is working with the Ecomuseum to develop new knowledge around how to best maintain and breed Quebec's smallest frog species in captivity.

The Biodome has played a critical role in conserving the genetic variability of the copper redhorse, a fish species that is found only in Quebec, thanks in part to an artificial reproduction technique developed with the Université du Québec à Montréal.

The Biodome also houses Canada's largest geothermal heating system, which dramatically reduces the facility's greenhouse gas emissions.

== In other media ==
In 1994, the National Film Board of Canada released L'arche de verre (The Glass Ark), a documentary directed by Bernard Gosselin about the creation and opening of the Biodome.

In 2006, Canadian poet Stephanie Bolster released a chapbook entitled BIODÔME, published by rob mclennan's above/ground press.

In 2026, Canadian poet Misha Solomon released a chapbook entitled BIODÔME: a bestiary after Stephanie Bolster.

== Gallery ==
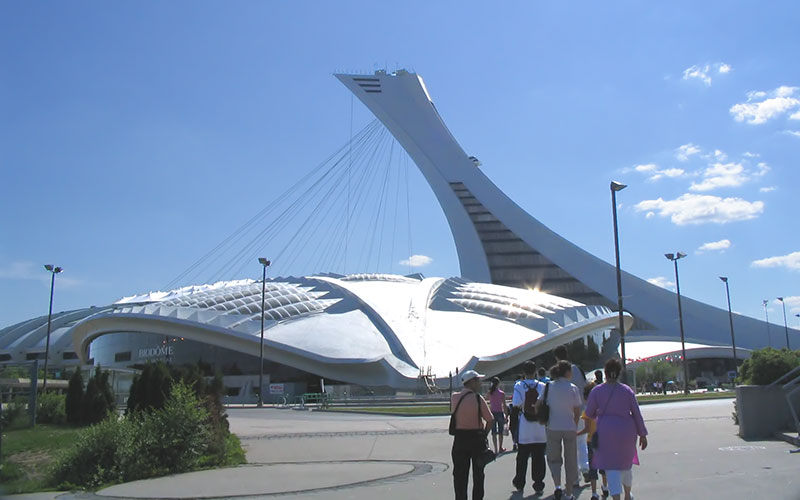
The Biodome, in front of the Olympic Stadium

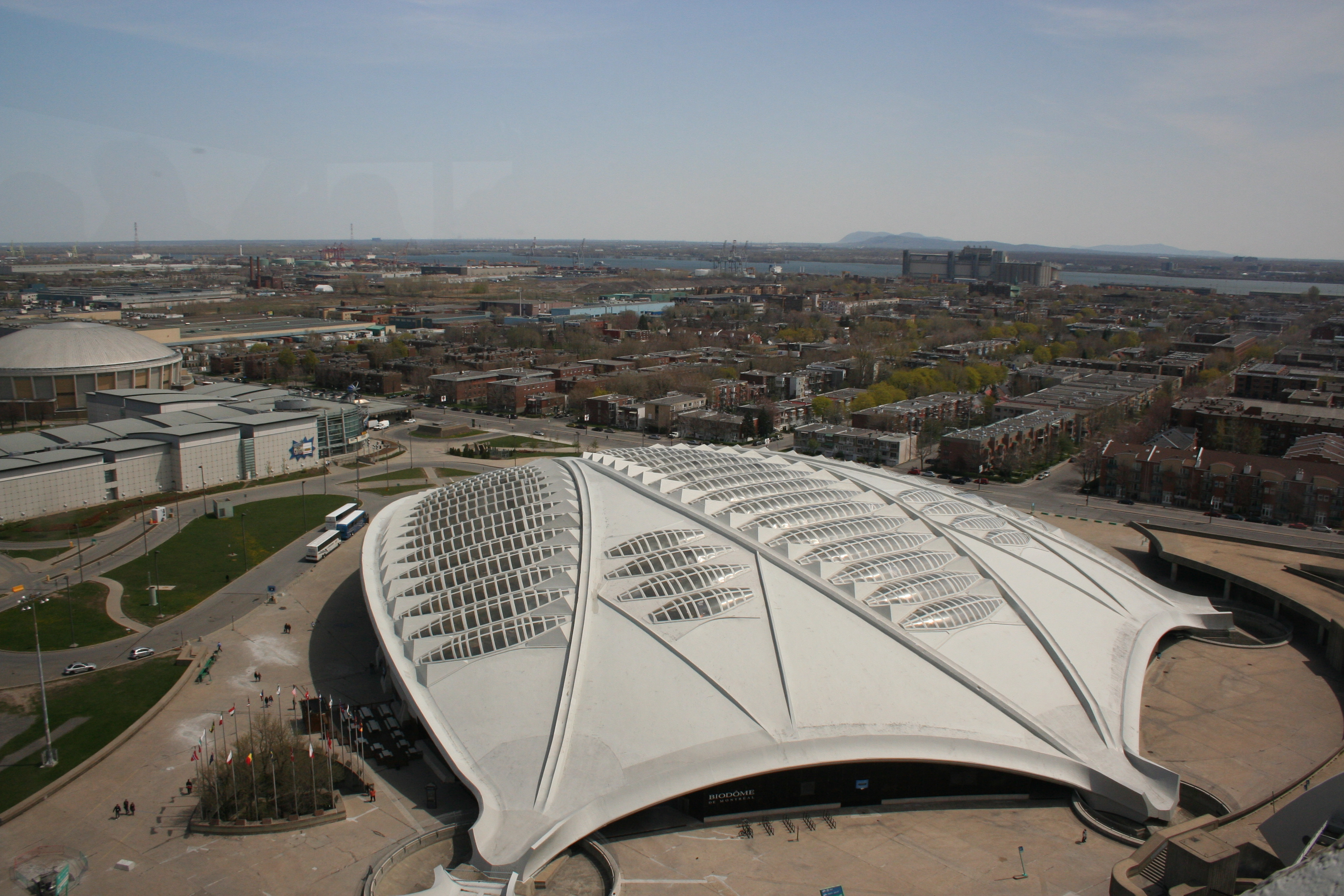
View from above

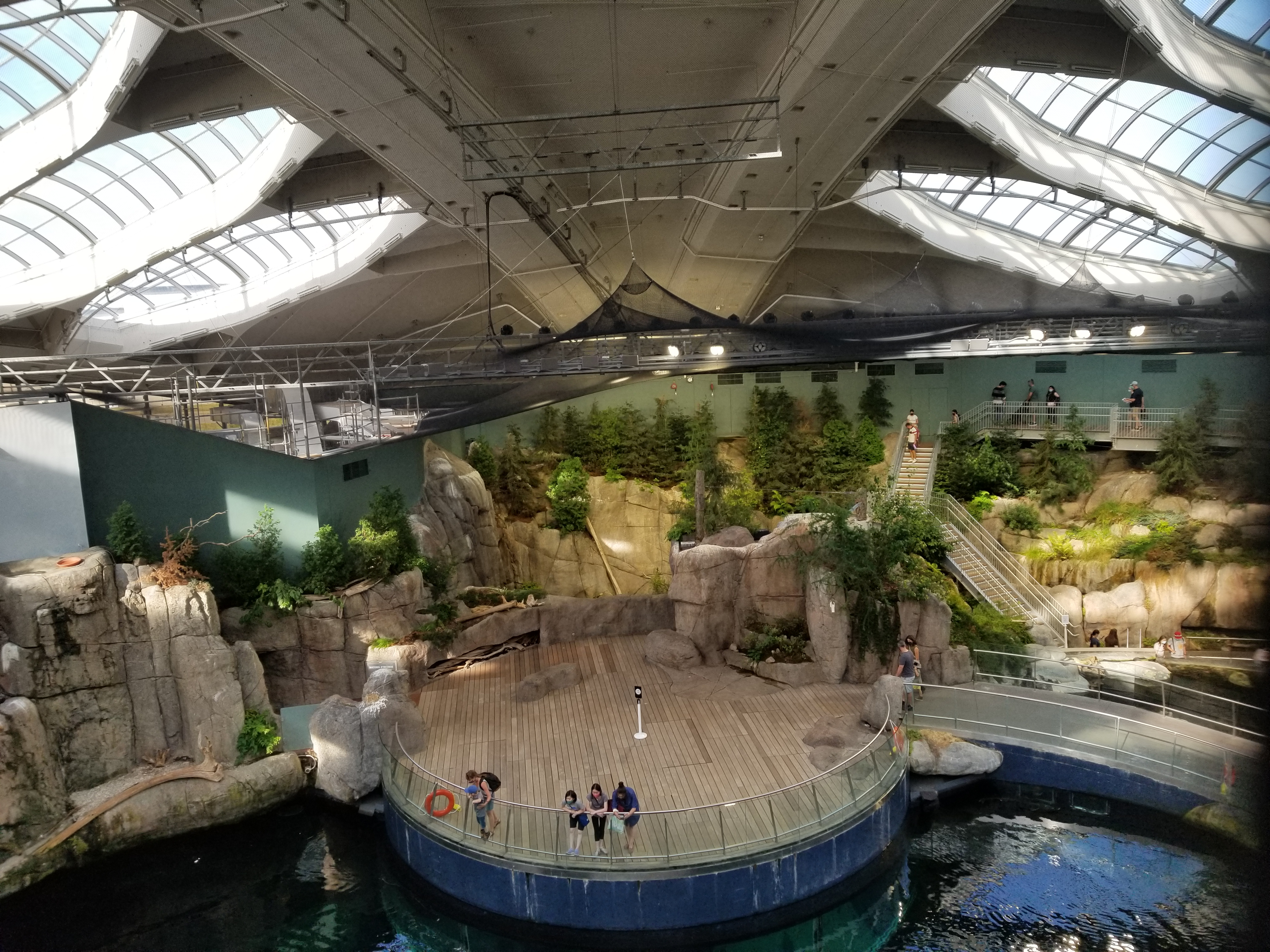
Inside the Biodome (Gulf of St. Lawrence area)

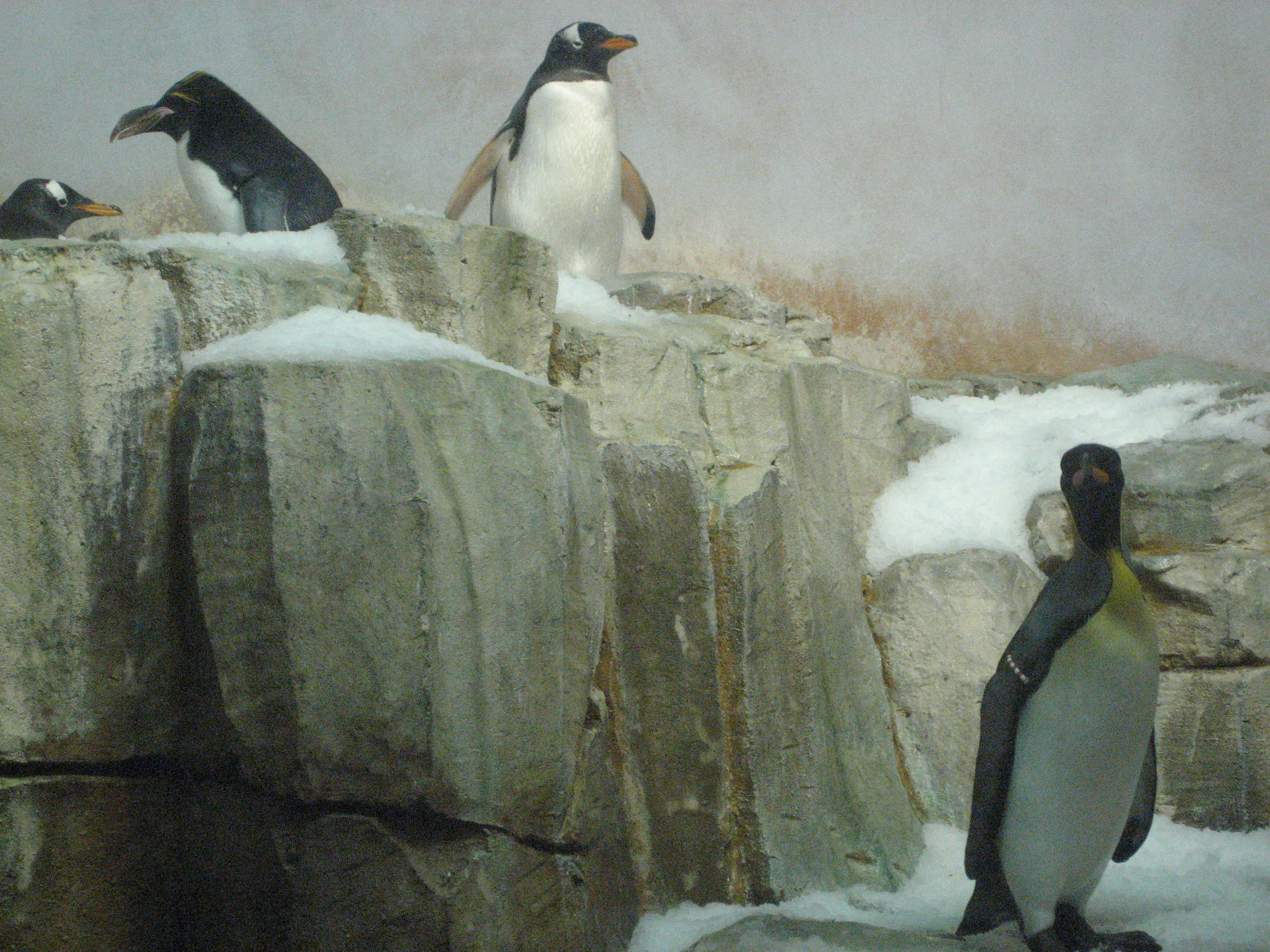
Some penguins in the Sub-Antarctic Islands area

== See also ==
- Bio-Dome, the film
- Biosphere 2, the attempt to create a self-contained ecological system
- List of cycling tracks and velodromes
- Olympic Stadium (Montreal)
