= Côte-Sainte-Catherine station =

Montreal Metro station

Côte-Sainte-Catherine
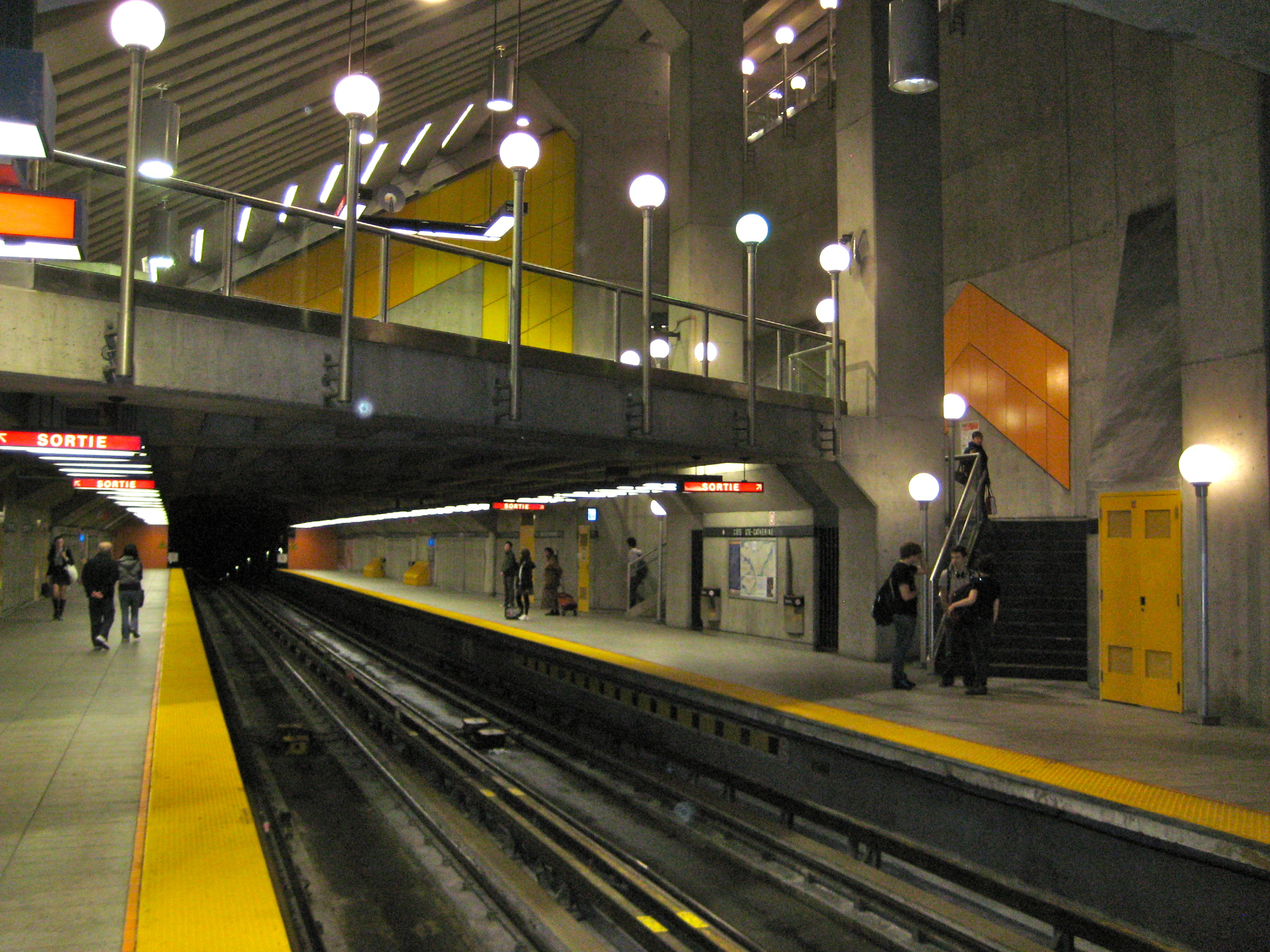

General information
- Location: 4780, chemin de la Côte-Ste-Catherine at av. Victoria; Montreal, Quebec H3W 3G6; Canada
- Coordinates: 45°29′32″N 73°37′58″W
- Operator: Société de transport de Montréal
- Platforms: 2 side platforms
- Tracks: 2
- Connections: STM bus

Construction
- Depth: 17.7 metres (58 feet 1 inch), 20th deepest
- Accessible: No
- Architect: Gilbert Sauvé

Other information
- Fare zone: ARTM: A

History
- Opened: 4 January 1982

Passengers
- 2024: 2,069,499 ▲7.59%
- Rank: 50 of 68

Services
Preceding station	Montreal Metro	Following station
Plamondon toward Côte-Vertu	Orange Line	Snowdon toward Montmorency
Location

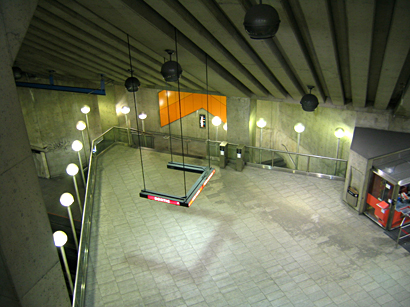
Upper level view of the Cote Ste. Catherine metro station

Côte-Sainte-Catherine station (French pronunciation: [kot sɛ̃t katʁin]) is a Montreal Metro station in the borough of Côte-des-Neiges–Notre-Dame-de-Grâce in Montreal, Quebec, Canada. It is operated by the Société de transport de Montréal (STM) and serves the Orange Line. It is located in the Snowdon neighbourhood. The station opened on January 4, 1982, and briefly served as the western terminus of the Orange Line, replacing Snowdon station until Plamondon station opened in June of that year.

== Overview ==
The station is a normal side platform station, built in tunnel with a central mezzanine built in trench, and one entrance.

The station was designed by Gilbert Sauvé and contains murals and reliefs by the architect.

In June 2010 the station was closed for renovations and reopened in August.

== Origin of the name ==
This station is named for the chemin de la Côte-Sainte-Catherine, the main street of the former village of Outremont, which had been called Côte Sainte-Catherine since the 17th century. The station, road, and côte were all named for Saint Catherine of Alexandria.

== Connecting bus routes ==
Société de transport de Montréal
No.	Route	Connects to	Service times / notes
124	Victoria	Vendôme; Plamondon; Côte-de-Liesse	Daily
129	Côte-Sainte-Catherine	Place-des-Arts; Champ-de-Mars	Daily
368 ☾	Avenue-Du-Mont-Royal	Frontenac; Édouard-Montpetit; Université-de-Montréal; Plamondon; Namur; De La Savane; Côte-Vertu	Night service

== Nearby points of interest ==
- Sir Mortimer B. Davis Jewish General Hospital
- Segal Centre for Performing Arts (formerly the Saidye Bronfman Centre)
- Centre communautaire juif
- Grand rabbinat du Québec
- Talmud Torahs unis de Montréal
- Communauté sépharade de Montréal
- Montreal Holocaust Museum
- Mackenzie King Park
