= Plamondon station =

Montreal Metro station

Plamondon
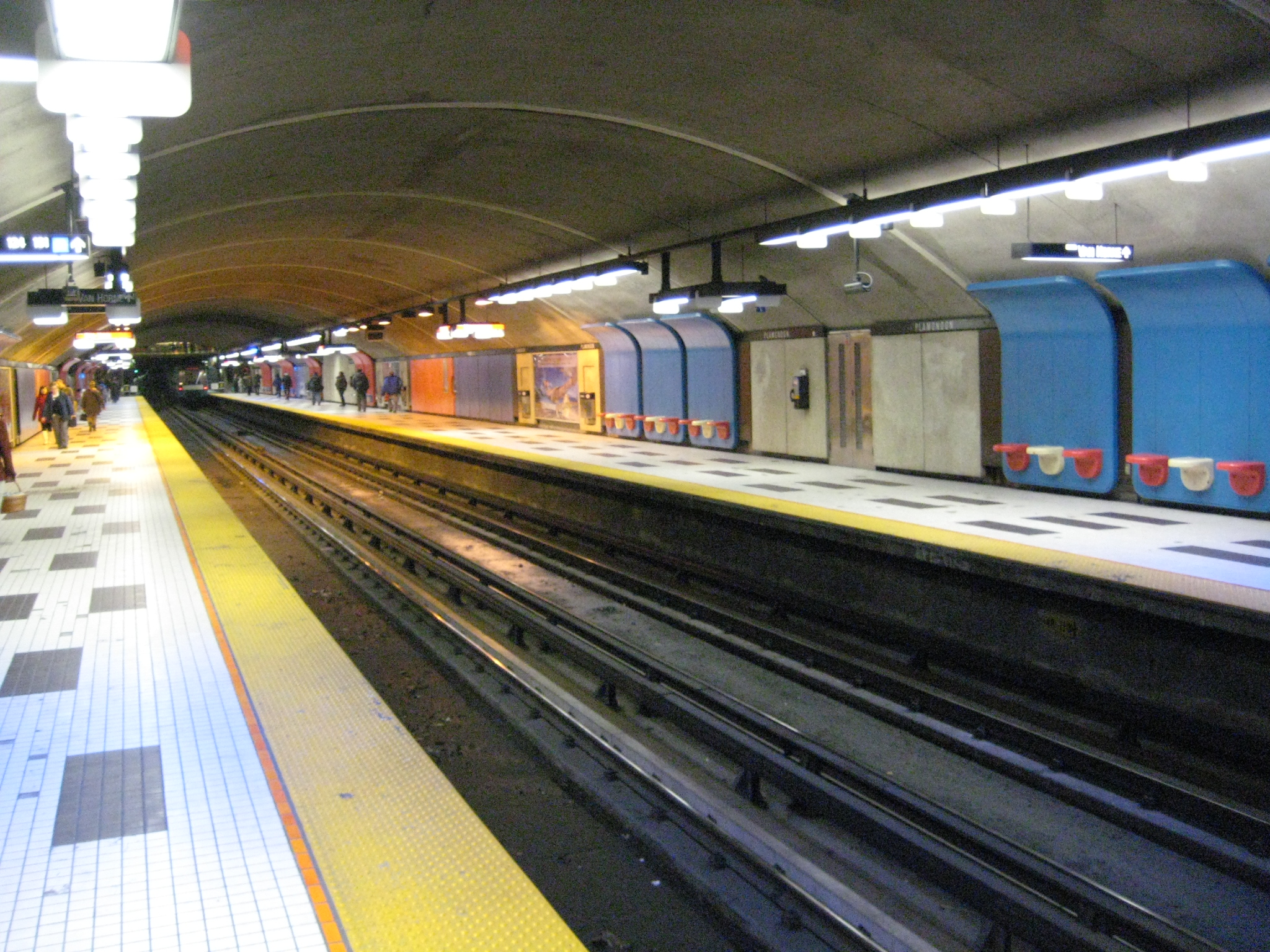

General information
- Location: 4811, av. Plamondon & 6250, av. Victoria; Montreal, Quebec H3W 3G4; Canada
- Coordinates: 45°29′44″N 73°38′26″W
- Operator: Société de transport de Montréal
- Platforms: 2 side platforms
- Tracks: 2
- Connections: STM bus

Construction
- Depth: 23.8 metres (78 feet 1 inch), 8th deepest
- Accessible: No
- Architect: Patrice Gauthier

Other information
- Fare zone: ARTM: A

History
- Opened: 29 June 1982

Passengers
- 2024: 3,875,342 ▲8.45%
- Rank: 23 of 68

Services
| Preceding station | Montreal Metro | Following station |
|---|---|---|
| Namur toward Côte-Vertu | Orange Line | Côte-Sainte-Catherine toward Montmorency |
Location

Plamondon station is a Montreal Metro station in the borough of Côte-des-Neiges–Notre-Dame-de-Grâce in Montreal, Quebec, Canada. It is operated by the Société de transport de Montréal (STM) and serves the Orange Line. It is located in the Snowdon neighbourhood of Côte-des-Neiges–Notre-Dame-de-Grâce. It opened on June 29, 1982 and replaced Côte-Sainte-Catherine station as the Orange Line's western terminus until the extension to Du Collège station was completed in 1984.

== Overview ==
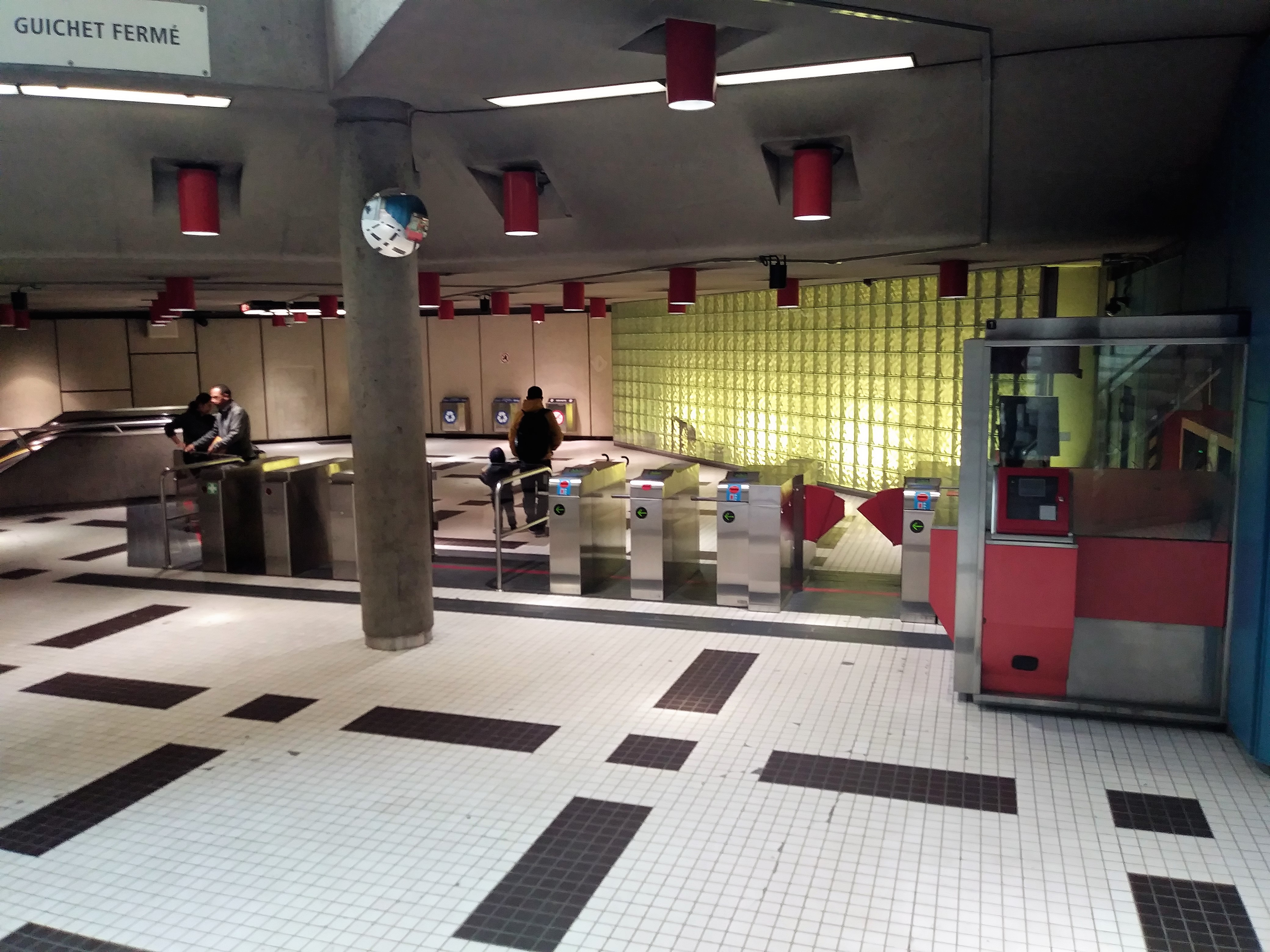
Station concourse

The station is a normal side platform station with an entrance at either end. The northern entrance is integrated into a social housing project at the corner of Avenue Plamondon and Victoria Avenue. The southern entrance is located on the corner of Van Horne avenue and Victoria avenue near a commercial center and an elementary school. The station decor is divided in two to reflect the two entrances, with blue panels to the north and reddish-pink to the south.

The station was designed by Patrice Gauthier.

== Origin of the name ==
This station is named for av. Plamondon, so named by Montreal city council in 1911 without a stated reason. It may be named for Quebec painter Antoine Plamondon (1804–1895) or singer Rodolphe Plamondon (1875–1940).

== Connecting bus routes ==
Société de transport de Montréal
| No. | Route | Connects to | Service times / notes |
|---|---|---|---|
| 124 | Victoria | Vendôme; Côte-Sainte-Catherine; Côte-de-Liesse | Daily |
| 160 | Barclay | Beaubien; Canora | Daily |
| 161 | Van Horne | Rosemont; Outremont | Daily |
| 368 ☾ | Avenue-Du-Mont-Royal | Frontenac; Édouard-Montpetit; Université-de-Montréal; Côte-Sainte-Catherine; Namur; De La Savane; Côte-Vertu | Night service |
| 370 ☾ | Rosemont | Honoré-Beaugrand; Radisson; Langelier; Rosemont; Outremont | Night service |

== Nearby points of interest ==
- Marché Victoria
- Congregation Shomrim Laboker
- Collège rabbinique du Canada
- Parc Nelson-Mandela
- Centre commercial Van Horne
- Loisirs Sportifs Côte-Des-Neiges
- Parc Van Horne
- Plaza Côte-des-Neiges
