= Côte-Sainte-Catherine Road =

Street in Montreal, Canada

Coordinates: 45.502224°N 73.624229°W

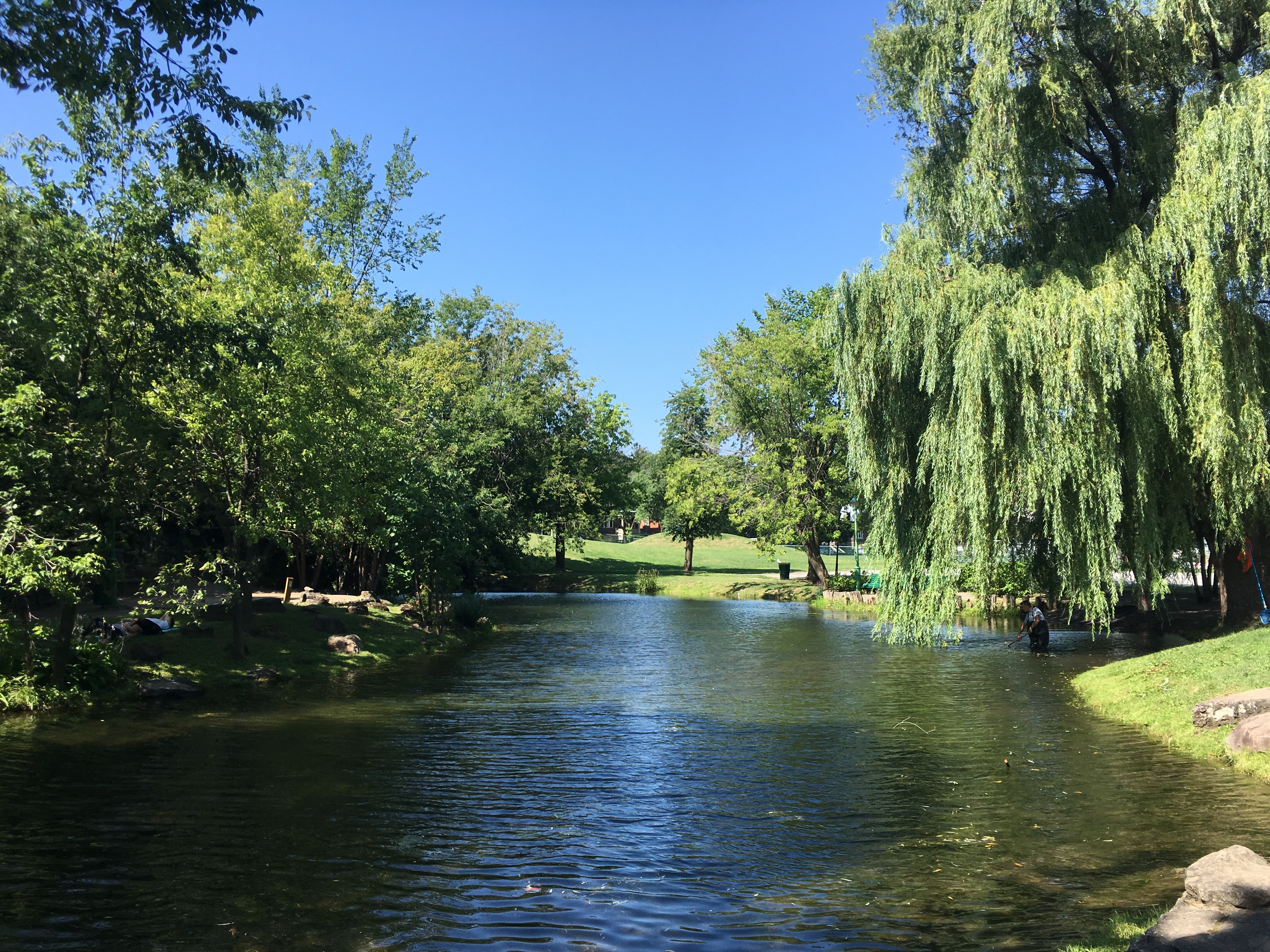
- Beaubien Park, located on Côte-Sainte-Catherine Road in Outremont
- Native name: Chemin de la Côte-Sainte-Catherine (French)
- Former name(s): Boulevard Sainte-Marie (1911-1917)
- Length: 5.5 km (3.4 mi)
- Location: Montreal
- West end: A-15 Décarie Boulevard, Snowdon
- East end: Avenue du Parc, Le Plateau-Mont-Royal

Construction
- Completion: before 1875
- Inauguration: 1917 (name changed from Boulevard Sainte-Marie)

Côte-Sainte-Catherine Road (officially in French: Chemin de la Côte-Sainte-Catherine; known as Boulevard Sainte-Marie between 1911 and 1917) is a street in Montreal, Quebec, Canada. It begins at the Décarie Expressway in Snowdon, part of the borough of Côte-des-Neiges–Notre-Dame-de-Grâce, and runs east and southeast along the periphery of Mount Royal to Park Avenue in the Plateau, terminating near Mount Royal Avenue. In between, it crosses Outremont completely and is one of the oldest streets in the borough, having been present at the time Outremont was incorporated in 1875. Outremont's borough (formerly city) hall is located on this street, as is Beaubien Park. Further west in Côte-des-Neiges, it houses the Jewish General Hospital, the CHU Sainte-Justine hospital, Collège Jean-de-Brébeuf, the Montreal Holocaust Museum, and the Segal Centre for Performing Arts.

The Montreal Metro provides ample coverage around the western portion of the street. Côte-Sainte-Catherine station on the Orange Line is located at its corner with Victoria Avenue, while the Blue Line runs a few blocks to the south, across the campus of the Université de Montréal.

== Sources ==
- Ville de Montréal. Les rues de Montréal. Répertoire historique. Montréal. Méridien, 1995.
