= Louis-Tancrède Bouthillier =

Canadian merchant and sheriff

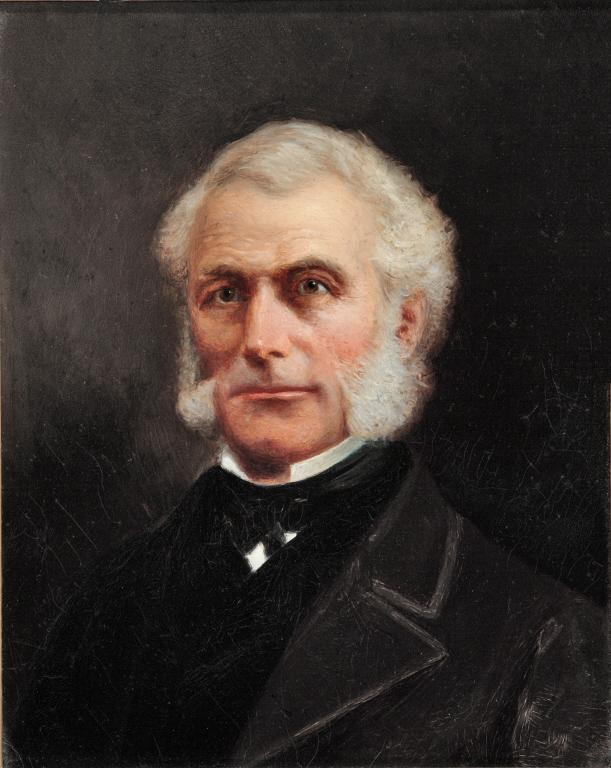

Personal details
- Born: March 1, 1796 Montreal, Quebec
- Died: February 28, 1881 (aged 84) Outre-Mont, Montreal

Louis-Tancrède Bouthillier (March 1, 1796 – February 28, 1881) was Sheriff of Montreal, a Canadian officer, merchant and landowner. His home Outre-Mont gave its name to the village that subsequently became the City of Outremont. He later purchased the manor of his wife's uncle, Clément-Charles Sabrevois de Bleury.

== Biography ==
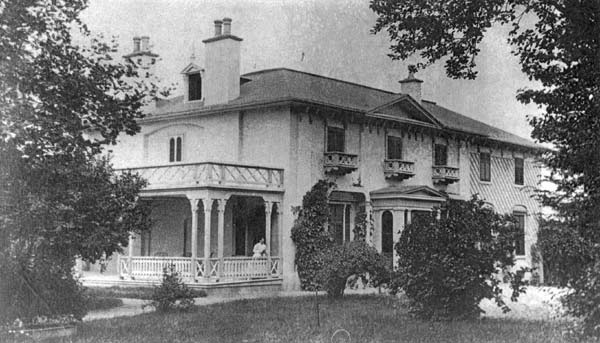
Outremont built by Bouthillier c.1830

Bouthillier was born March 1, 1796, in Montreal to Jean Bouthillier, a successful merchant from La Rochelle, and Louise Perthuis. His sister was married to Pierre de Rastel de Rocheblave.

In 1830 he married Françoise-Geneviève, daughter of Benjamin Trottier-Desrivières-Beaubien and Françoise-Geneviève Sabrevois de Bleury, sister of Clément-Charles Sabrevois de Bleury. In 1832 he was appointed director of Trinity House and inspector of potash in Montreal.

In 1833, Bouthillier bought eight lots in Montreal, one of which was in the Côte Sainte-Catherine, where he built a large brick house that he named Outre-Mont (over the mountain). The village of Outremont, which was named after this house, became a borough of Montreal in the municipal mergers of 2002.

He also inherited some property from his father, including a lot on St. Paul Street. Bouthillier hired mason Louis Comte to build a combination store and residence on the site, which he owned until his death.

He was named commissioner of the Lachine Canal in 1835, and commissioner of the lands of the Crown (commissaire des terres de la Couronne) in 1838.

From 1850, he held the post of custom duty collector in Montreal, a position he left in 1863 to become sheriff of the city for nearly ten years. He also became President of the Saint-Jean-Baptiste Society in 1864.

In 1862, he purchased the manor house of his uncle by marriage, the late Clément-Charles Sabrevois de Bleury.

Louis-Tancrède Bouthillier died February 28, 1881. He was survived by his two sons, Charles-Frontenac Bouthillier and Henri Bouthillier.
