= Van Horne Avenue =

Thoroughfare in Montreal, Canada

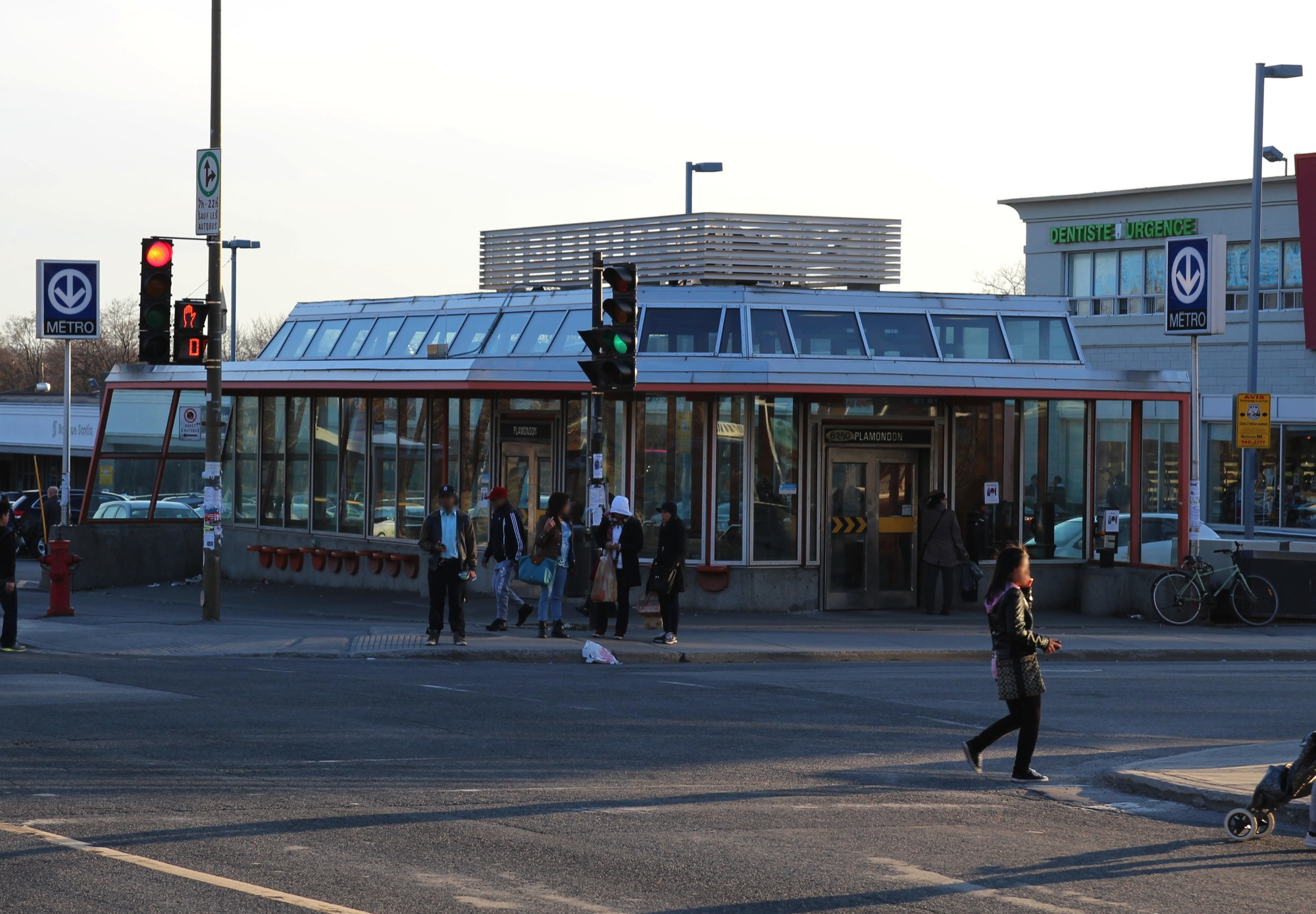
- Plamondon station at Van Horne and Victoria
- Interactive map of Van Horne Avenue
- Namesake: William Cornelius Van Horne
- Length: 6.3 km (3.9 mi)
- Location: Montreal
- East end: Saint Denis Street
- Major junctions: R-335
- West end: Macdonald Avenue (continues as Fleet Road)

Van Horne Avenue (French: avenue Van Horne) is an east-west road in Montreal. It begins at the western boundary of the borough of Côte-des-Neiges–Notre-Dame-de-Grâce and continues east to the Rosemont-Van Horne overpass in the Mile End. East of Saint Denis it becomes Rosemont Boulevard, while in the municipalities of Hampstead and Côte Saint-Luc it is known as Fleet Road.

== Transit ==
Plamondon and Outremont metro stations are located on Van Horne, meanwhile Rosemont is located on the Rosemont Boulevard portion of the street. Bus 161 serves the Van Horne and Fleet portions from Côte Saint-Luc to Rosemont station, bus 197 serves the Rosemont portion from Rosemont station to Langelier station and night bus 370 for the entire length combining the routes of the 161 and 197 as well as an additional journey to Radisson and Honoré Beaugrand metro stations.

== Namesake ==
The avenue is named after Montrealer William Cornelius Van Horne, who oversaw the construction of Canada's first transcontinental railway.
