= Beaubien station =

Montreal Metro station

Beaubien
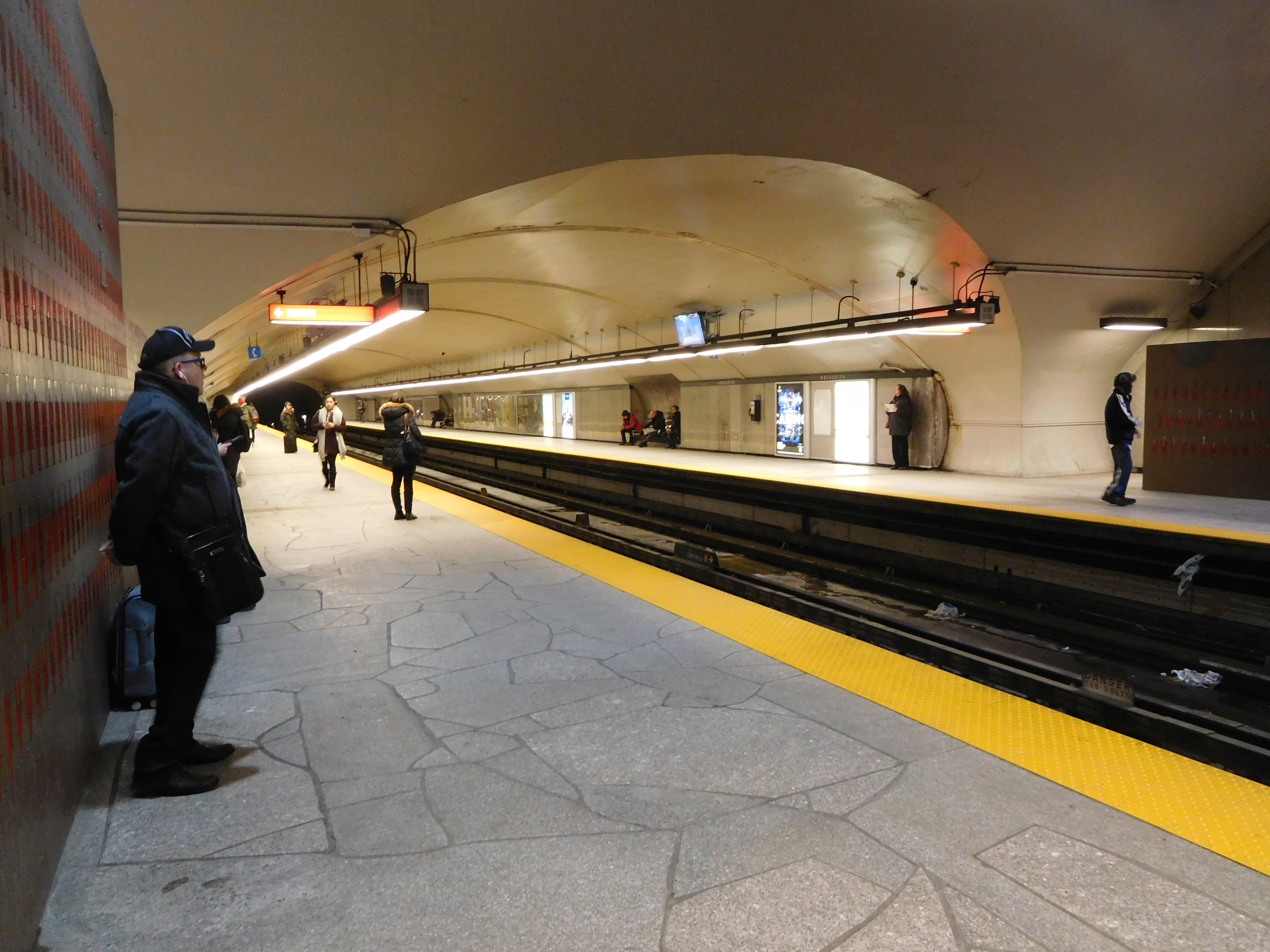

General information
- Location: 6530, av. de Châteaubriand; Montreal, Quebec H2S 2N7; Canada
- Coordinates: 45°32′08″N 73°36′16″W
- Operator: Société de transport de Montréal
- Platforms: 2 side platforms
- Tracks: 2
- Connections: STM bus

Construction
- Depth: 12.5 metres (41 feet), 41st deepest
- Accessible: No
- Architect: Roger d'Astous

Other information
- Fare zone: ARTM: A

History
- Opened: 14 October 1966

Passengers
- 2024: 3,264,023 ▲29.67%
- Rank: 31 of 68

Services
Preceding station	Montreal Metro	Following station
Rosemont toward Côte-Vertu	Orange Line	Jean-Talon toward Montmorency
Location

Beaubien station (French pronunciation: [bobjɛ̃]) is a Montreal Metro station in the borough of Rosemont—La Petite-Patrie in Montreal, Quebec, Canada. It is operated by the Société de transport de Montréal (STM) and serves the Orange Line. The station opened on October 14, 1966, as part of the original network of the Metro.

== Overview ==
The station, designed by Roger d'Astous, is a normal side platform station, built in tunnel. The large entrance structure contains the ticket barrier, as well as a light shaft and an open sided bus shelter. Noted ceramicist Claude Vermette collaborated on the tile designs.

== Origin of the name ==
This station is named for Beaubien Street, named for a prominent French-Canadian family of landholders, public figures, and professionals.

== Connecting bus routes ==
Société de transport de Montréal
No.	Route	Connects to	Service times / notes
18	Beaubien	Pie-IX BRT; Honoré-Beaugrand	Daily
31	Saint-Denis	Henri-Bourassa; Sauvé; Crémazie; Jarry; Jean-Talon; Rosemont; Laurier; Mont-Royal; Sherbrooke	Daily
160	Barclay	Canora; Plamondon	Daily
361 ☾	Saint-Denis	Replaces the Orange Line from Henri-Bourassa to Place-d'Armes	Night service

== Station improvements ==
Beaubien station was closed from May 4 to August 30, 2015 for station modernization. This included refurbishing structural slabs, floor finishes and the entrance building's waterproofing membrane, installing a new ventilation shaft, replacing light fixtures and granite stairs, repairing and replacing wall panels and floor slabs, replacing walkway edges and sidewalks, and adding trees and shrubs. Shuttle buses operated between Rosemont and Jean-Talon to serve the station.

Construction in 2020 to demolish and rebuild the skylight dome located near De Saint-Vallier to ensure that the ceiling is waterproof was completed in winter 2021.

== Nearby points of interest ==
- Plaza Saint-Hubert
- Canadian Citizenship Court
- CLSC La Petite Patrie
- Esperanto Society of Quebec
