= Outremont station =

Montreal Metro station

Outremont
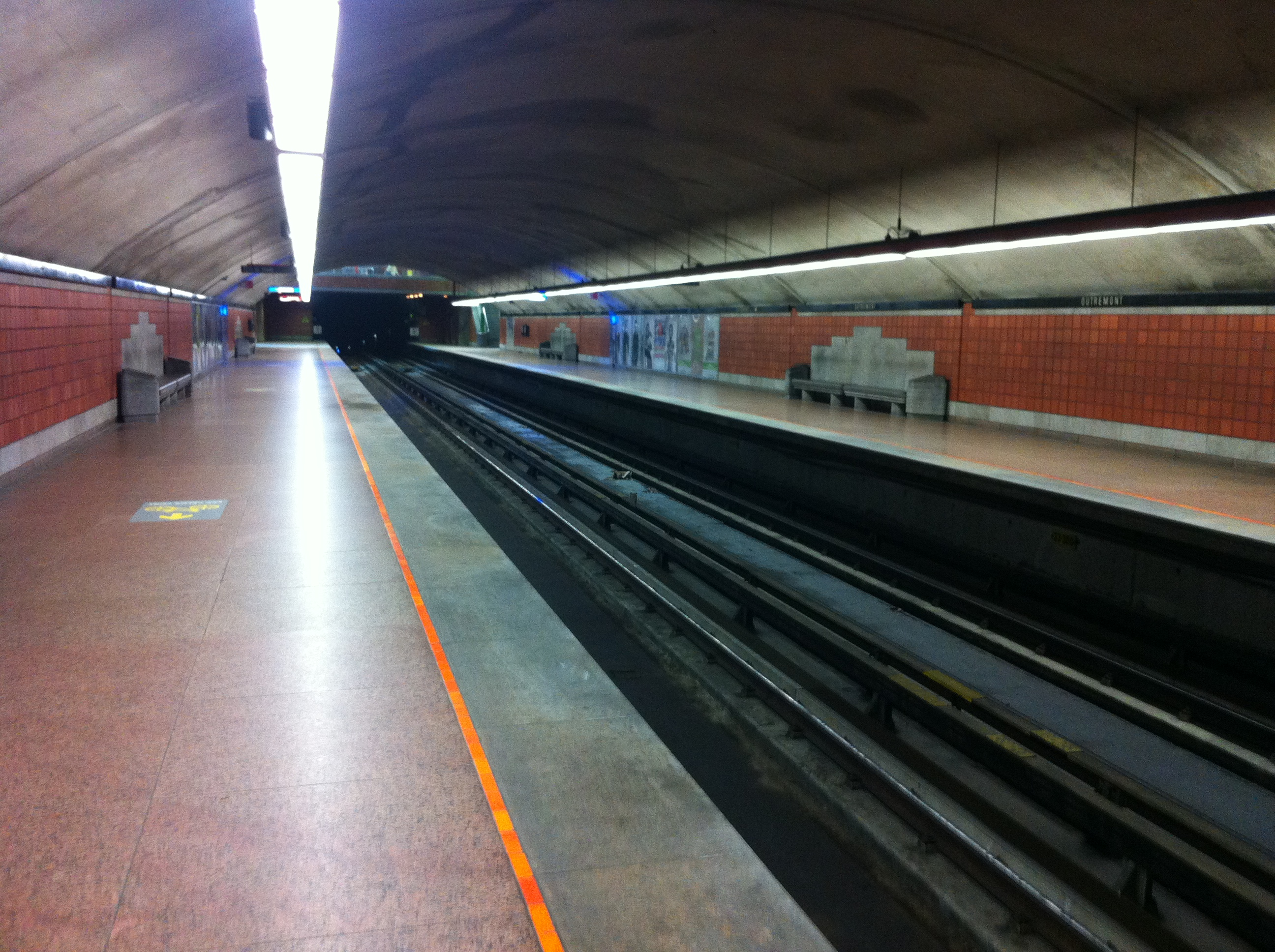

General information
- Location: 1400, Van Horne Avenue; Outremont, Quebec H2V 1L1; Canada
- Coordinates: 45°31′13″N 73°36′54″W
- Operator: Société de transport de Montréal
- Platforms: 2 side platforms
- Tracks: 2
- Connections: STM bus

Construction
- Depth: 13.8 metres (45 feet 3 inches), 38th deepest
- Accessible: Yes
- Architect: Dupuis, Chapuis, & Dubuc

Other information
- Fare zone: ARTM: A

History
- Opened: 4 January 1988
- Closed: January 10 to August 19, 2022
- Rebuilt: 2021-2024

Passengers
- 2024: 1,392,667 ▲9.08%
- Rank: 57 of 68

Services
Preceding station	Montreal Metro	Following station
Édouard-Montpetit toward Snowdon	Blue Line	Acadie toward Saint-Michel
Location

Outremont station (French pronunciation: [utʁəmɔ̃]) is a Montreal Metro station in the Outremont borough of Montreal, Quebec, Canada. It is operated by the Société de transport de Montréal (STM) and serves the Blue Line. It opened in January 1988.

== Overview ==
The Outremont station was designed by the architectural firm Dupuis, Chapuis, & Dubuc, with Pierre Chapuis as one of the lead architects. It is a normal side platform station with a mined trainroom and open-cut volume at one end, containing the ticket hall and topped by the one large entrance and a glazed skylight. Classic materials and a mural of glazed ceramics by Gilbert Poissant evoke the architecture of the surrounding neighbourhood, as does a Borough of Outremont lamp post at the foot of the stairs to one platform.

=== Station upgrade ===
In 2021, work began to make the station universally accessible, provide a new ventilation shaft, as well as other refurbishments including flooring, waterproofing and new lighting.

Due to the single entrance building at the station, upgrade works could not safely take place while the station was open. The station was therefore temporarily closed between January and August 2022, with a shuttle bus provided to take passengers to Acadie station. Works (such as the installation of elevators) has been done since December 18, 2024. As part of the upgrade works, The Saint-Michel and Snowdon elevators and an artwork has been commissioned for the station.

== Origin of name ==
The station takes its name from the borough (formerly city) of Outremont, in which it is located. Originally named Côte-Sainte-Catherine, the town took its name in 1875 from a mansion, still extant, built in 1833 by Louis-Tancrède Bouthillier and named "Outre-Mont" ("beyond the mountain" from the main settlement of Montreal).

== Connecting bus routes ==
Société de transport de Montréal
No.	Route	Connects to	Service times / notes
119	Rockland	Ville-de-Mont-Royal; Côte-des-Neiges	Daily
161	Van Horne	Rosemont; Plamondon	Daily
370 ☾	Rosemont	Honoré-Beaugrand; Radisson; Langelier; Rosemont; Plamondon	Night service

== Nearby points of interest ==
- Collège Stanislas
- Outremont Theatre
- Cathédrale arménienne Saint-Grégoire l'Illuminateur
