= Rosemont station (Montreal Metro) =

Metro station in Montreal, Quebec, Canada

Rosemont
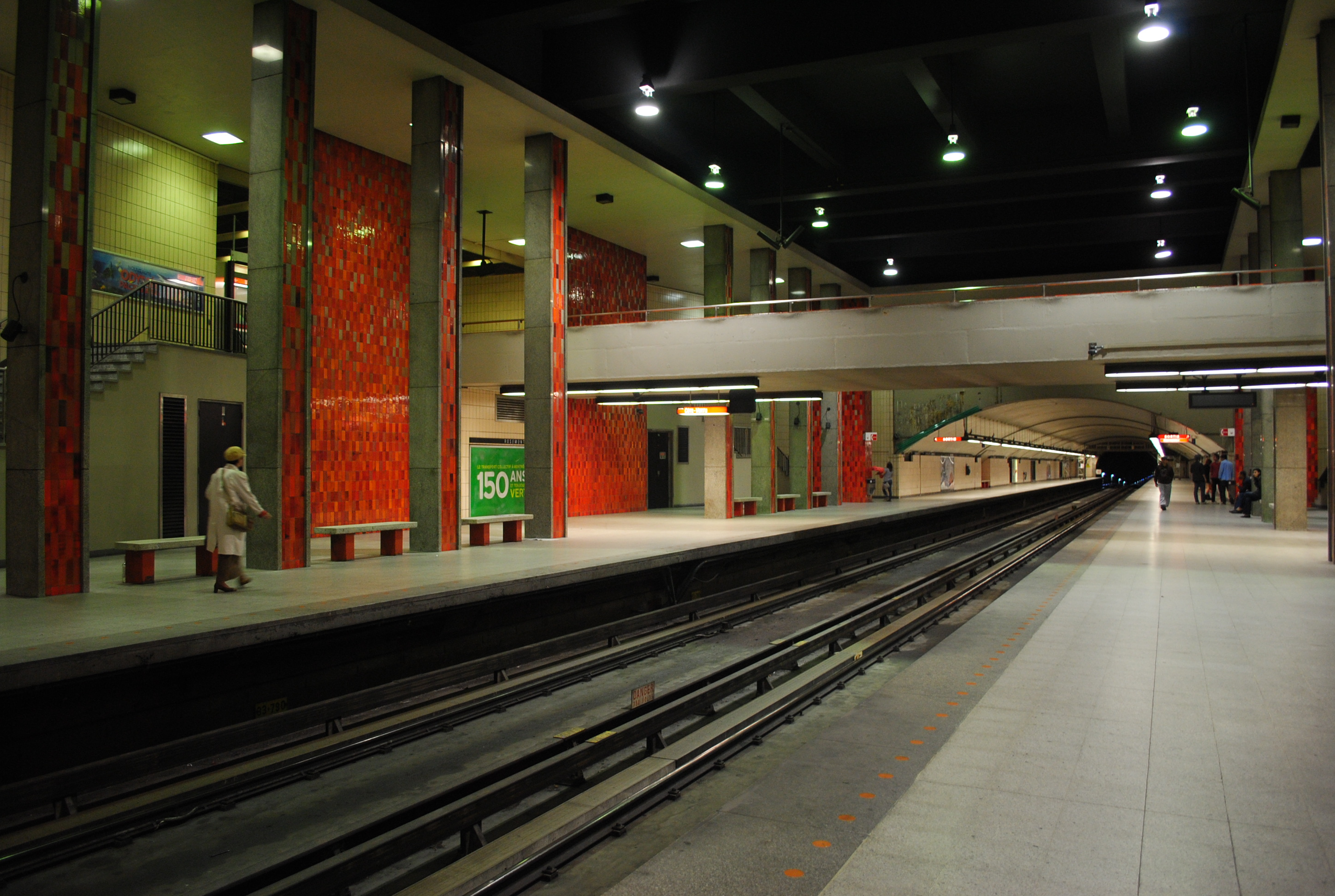

General information
- Location: 420, boul. Rosemont; Montreal, Quebec H2S 1Z3; Canada
- Coordinates: 45°31′52″N 73°35′51″W
- Operator: Société de transport de Montréal
- Platforms: 2 side platforms
- Tracks: 2
- Connections: STM bus

Construction
- Depth: 11.6 metres (38 feet 1 inch), 46th deepest
- Accessible: Yes
- Architect: Duplessis, Labelle et Derome

Other information
- Fare zone: ARTM: A

History
- Opened: 14 October 1966

Passengers
- 2024: 2,781,494 ▲12.41%
- Rank: ERROR

Services
Preceding station	Montreal Metro	Following station
Laurier toward Côte-Vertu	Orange Line	Beaubien toward Montmorency
Location

Rosemont station (French pronunciation: [ʁozmɔ̃]) is a Montreal Metro station in the borough of Rosemont–La Petite-Patrie in Montreal, Quebec, Canada. It is operated by the Société de transport de Montréal (STM) and serves the Orange Line. The station opened on October 14, 1966, as part of the original network of the Metro.

== Overview ==
The station, designed by Duplessis, Labelle et Derome, is a normal side platform station built into a tunnel. It has a ticket barrier at transept level that leads to a single entrance, adjacent to a bus loop and to a municipal parking lot.

In 2015, work began to make the station accessible at a cost of around $10m. This work was completed in January 2017, following the installation of three elevators. The OMHM is building a complex on top of the metro as well a public square on the behalf of the city of Montréal.

== Origin of the name ==
This station is named for boulevard Rosemont, the main street of the Rosemont district. This area was developed on an area purchased by land speculators Ucal-Henri Dandurand and Herbert Holt from the Canadian Pacific Railway; it was incorporated as the Village of Rosemont in 1915, named by Dandurand in honour of his mother, née Rose Phillips.

== Connecting bus routes ==
Société de transport de Montréal
No.	Route	Connects to	Service times / notes
13	Christophe-Colomb	Henri-Bourassa	Daily Starts/ends at Georges-Baril and Henri-Bourassa before 8PM weekdays
25	Angus	Préfontaine	Weekdays only
31	Saint-Denis	Henri-Bourassa; Sauvé; Crémazie; Jarry; Jean-Talon; Beaubien; Laurier; Mont-Royal; Sherbrooke	Daily
56	St-Hubert	Henri-Bourassa; Jean-Talon; Beaubien	Weekdays only
161	Van Horne	Outremont; Plamondon	Daily
197	Rosemont	Langelier; Pie-IX BRT	Daily
361 ☾	Saint-Denis	Replaces the Orange Line from Henri-Bourassa to Place-d'Armes	Night service
370 ☾	Rosemont	Honoré-Beaugrand; Radisson; Langelier; Outremont; Plamondon	Night service

== Nearby points of interest ==
- Aide Juridique (Place de la mode)
- École des métiers de l'automobile
- Monastère des Carmélites
- Cour du Québec (Chambre de la jeunesse)
- Centre d'accueil Gouin-Rosemont
