= Outremont, Quebec =

Coordinates: 45°31′N 73°37′W

Outremont
- Borough of Montreal
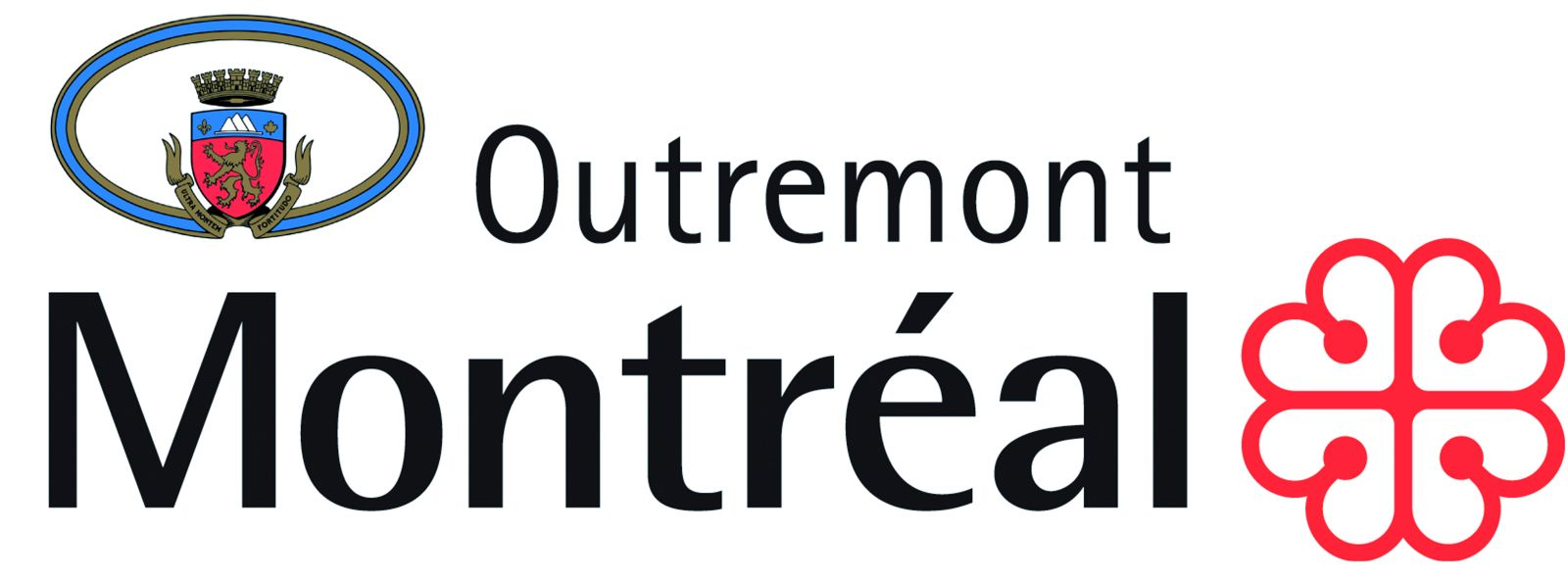

- Location of Outremont within the Island of Montreal, highlighted in red (light grey areas indicate City of Montreal).
- Country: Canada
- Province: Quebec
- Region: Montreal
- Created: January 1, 2002
- Electoral Districts Federal: Outremont
- Provincial: Mont-Royal–Outremont

Government
  - Type: Borough
  - Mayor: Laurent Desbois (EM)
  - Federal MP(s): Rachel Bendayan (LPC)
  - Quebec MNA(s): Michelle Setlakwe (PLQ)

Area
  - Land: 3.9 km^{2} (1.5 sq mi)

Population (2016)
  - Total: 23,954
  - Density: 6,221.8/km^{2} (16,114/sq mi)
  - Dwellings: 9,170
- Time zone: UTC-5 (EST)
  - Summer (DST): UTC-4 (EDT)
- Postal code(s): H2V
- Area codes: (514) and (438)
- Website: montreal.ca

Outremont (French pronunciation: [utʁəmɔ̃]) is an affluent residential borough (arrondissement) of the city of Montreal, Quebec, Canada. It consists entirely of the former city on the Island of Montreal in southwestern Quebec. The neighbourhood is inhabited largely by Francophones, and is also home to a Hasidic Jewish community. Since the 1950s, Outremont has been mostly residential, but some streets such as Van Horne, Bernard and Laurier have many commercial buildings.

The neighborhood's major commercial streets are Laurier Avenue, Bernard Avenue, and Van Horne Avenue.

== Geography ==
A separate city until the 2000 municipal mergers, Outremont is located north of downtown, on the north-western side of Mount Royal – its name means "beyond the mountain" although it encompasses Murray Hill (colline d'Outremont), one of the three peaks that make up Mount Royal. It was named for the house – Outre-Mont – built c. 1830 for Louis-Tancrède Bouthillier, a former Sheriff of Montreal.

The borough is bounded to the northwest by Mount Royal, to the northeast by Villeray–Saint-Michel–Parc-Extension and Rosemont–La Petite-Patrie, to the east by Le Plateau-Mont-Royal and the Mile End district, to the south by Ville-Marie, and to the west by Côte-des-Neiges–Notre-Dame-de-Grâce. The Mount Royal Cemetery is located in the south eastern tip of the borough.

== Toponymy ==
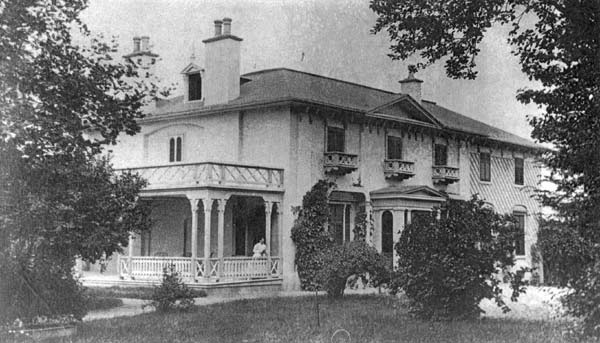
Louis-Tancrède Bouthillier's house, Outre-Mont, built c. 1830

The area was originally known as Côte Sainte-Catherine. The name Outremont came from how it was called at the time by travelers. Travelers who wished to travel north from downtown Montreal had to go "through" the mountain as in "Outre-Mont".

In 1833, Louis-Tancrède Bouthillier built a country residence that he named Outre-Mont; it still exists today on Rue McDougall. The term Outremont gradually becomes the term used to designate the region.

== History ==
In 1875, Louis Beaubien, a federal representative, gets a federal sanction for the village. To achieve the minimum amount of residence needed, Louis Beaubien counts barns and other farm buildings as residences. The town changes its name from Cote-Sainte-Catherine to Outremont. The village is home to only 300 souls.

In 1927, Outremont became the first place in the world to use a snow blower to clear its streets in the winter. It was the first production model of Canadian inventor Arthur Sicard's Sicard Industries.

Canadian Prime Minister Pierre Elliott Trudeau was born and raised in Outremont.

== Features ==
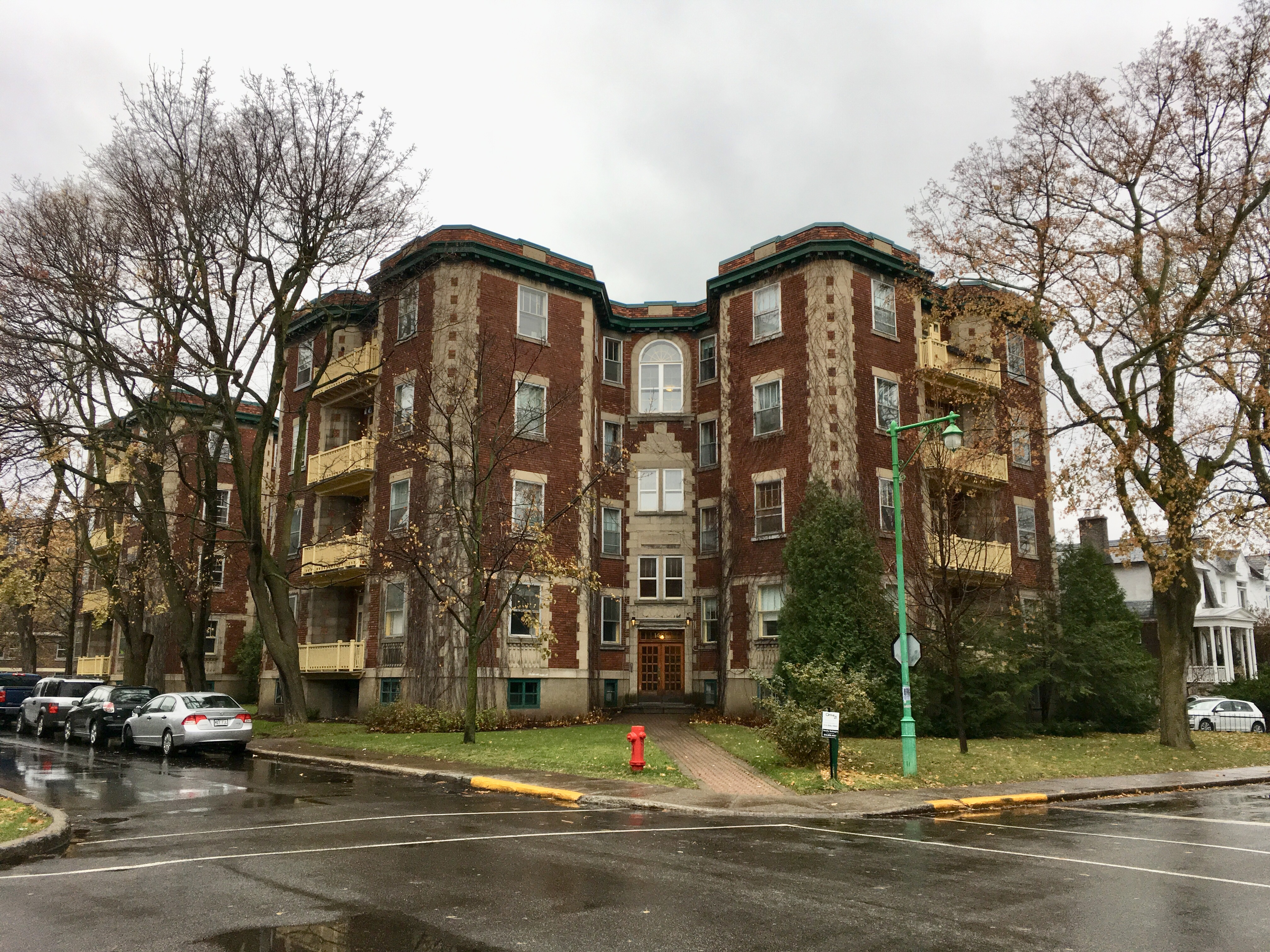
An apartment building on Bernard Avenue in Outremont

Outremont is served by the Outremont and Édouard-Montpetit stations on the Blue Line of the Montreal Metro. (Édouard-Montpetit station is actually located in Côte-des-Neiges, but right on the Outremont border).

Major thoroughfares include Avenue Van Horne and chemin de la Côte-Sainte-Catherine, with avenue Bernard and avenue Laurier as the principal shopping and dining areas. The area has a number of trendy restaurants, cafés and shops. Residents include a substantial percentage of expatriates from France. There is also a sizable Hassidic Jewish community, representing about 20% of Outremont's population, which resides mainly in the eastern and northern portions of the borough. Many Jewish synagogues, schools and businesses can be found on avenues Van Horne, Bernard and St-Viateur.

Among the attractions in the mainly residential community are the Mount Royal Cemetery, the Salle Claude-Champagne, the Théâtre Outremont, the Saint-Grégoire-l'Illuminateur Armenian Cathedral and part of the Université de Montréal campus.

Outremont also has a rail yard along its northern border. The rail yard has been purchased by the Université de Montréal and is to be developed to house its hospital complex, its research faculties and the faculty of Health Sciences (Centre Hospitalier de l'Université de Montréal).

Outremont was twinned as a sister city with Oakwood, Ohio and Le Vésinet, France.

== Demographics ==
Historical populations
Year	Pop.	±%
1966	30,881	—
1971	28,550	−7.5%
1976	27,089	−5.1%
1981	24,338	−10.2%
1986	23,080	−5.2%
1991	22,935	−0.6%
1996	22,571	−1.6%
2001	22,933	+1.6%
2006	22,897	−0.2%
2011	23,566	+2.9%
2016	23,954	+1.6%
2021	24,629	+2.8%

Home language (2016)

Language	Population	Percentage (%)
French	13,885	61%
English	4,260	19%
Other languages	4,460	20%

Mother Tongue (2016)

Language	Population	Percentage (%)
French	13,160	58%
English	3,075	13%
Other languages	6,650	29%

Visible Minorities (2016)
Ethnicity	Population	Percentage (%)
Not a visible minority	20,995	90.3%
Visible minorities	2,255	9.7%

== Politics ==
=== Federal and provincial elections ===
The borough is entirely contained within the federal riding of Outremont and the provincial riding of the Mont-Royal–Outremont.

=== Borough council ===
The borough is represented on Montreal City Council by its borough mayor alone. The borough is further divided into four districts, each of which elects one borough councillor. The current borough administration was elected in the November 2021 municipal elections.

District	Position	Name	Party
—	Borough mayor Montreal city councillor	Laurent Desbois	Ensemble Montréal
Claude-Ryan	Borough councillor	Mindy Pollak	Projet Montréal
Jeanne-Sauvé	Borough councillor	Caroline Braun	Ensemble Montréal
Joseph-Beaubien	Borough councillor	Valérie Patreau	Projet Montréal
Robert-Bourassa	Borough councillor	Marie Potvin	Ensemble Montréal

== Education ==
The Centre de services scolaire Marguerite-Bourgeoys operates Francophone public schools, but were previously operated by the Commission scolaire Marguerite-Bourgeoys until 15 June 2020. The change was a result of a law passed by the Quebec government that changed the school board system from denominational to linguistic.

Adult schools include:

- Centre d'éducation des adultes Outremont

Specialized schools include:

- Secondaire Adapté à ta Situation SAS

High schools include:

- École secondaire Paul-Gérin-Lajoie-d'Outremont
- Pensionnat du Saint-Nom-de-Marie
- Collège Jean-de-Brébeuf

Elementary schools include:

- Guy-Drummond
- Lajoie
- Nouvelle-Querbes
- Saint-Germain-d'Outremont
- Buissonnière - Saint-Anne

Additionally, Collège Stanislas, a primary and secondary school is in Outremont.

The Lester B. Pearson School Board (LBPSB) and English Montreal School Board (EMSB) operate Anglophone public schools in the greater Montreal area.

=== Public libraries ===
The Montreal Public Libraries Network operates the Robert-Bourassa Branch in Outremont.

== See also ==
- Kiryas Tosh, a Hasidic community in the town of Boisbriand, Quebec
- Boroughs of Montreal
- Districts of Montreal
- List of former cities in Quebec
- Municipal reorganization in Quebec
- People from Outremont
