= Société de transport de Montréal =

Public transport agency in Quebec

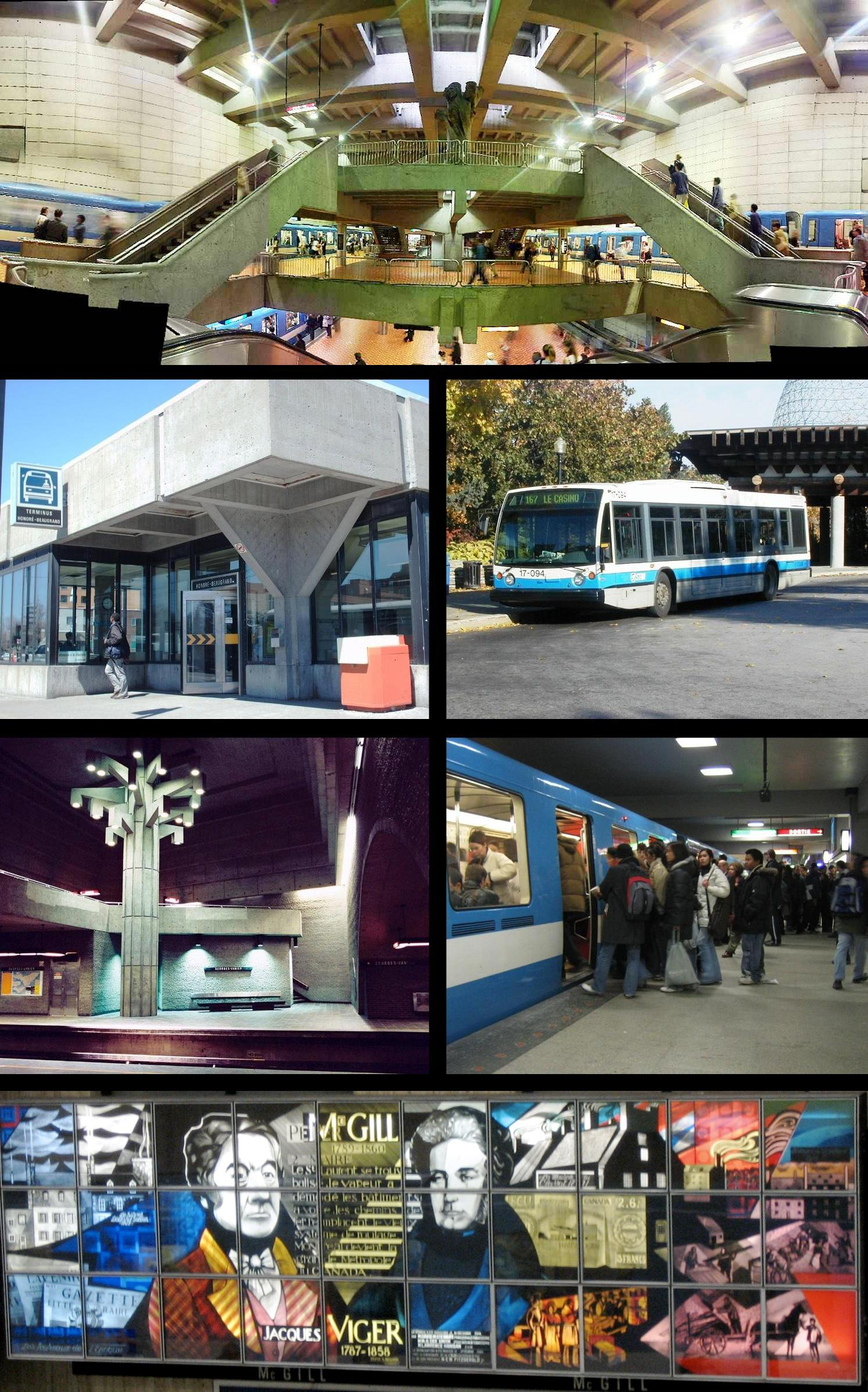
- Top: Lionel-Groulx station and STM logo. Prior to 2002, it was referred to as STCUM. Second row: Honoré-Beaugrand station, a 1996 NovaBus LFS "167 Le Casino" leaving the Montreal Biosphère and heading to the Casino de Montréal. Third row: Georges-Vanier station, Berri–UQAM station. Bottom: Montreal's first two mayors, Jacques Viger and Peter McGill, in stained glass in the McGill Station of the Montreal Metro.

Overview
- Locale: Agglomeration of Montreal
- Transit type: Bus, metro, Taxibus, paratransit
- Number of lines: 221 bus routes + 23 night routes, 4 subway lines
- Number of stations: 68 (5 under construction)
- Daily ridership: 1,728,700 (weekdays, Q2 2026)
- Annual ridership: 520,606,200 (2025)
- Chief executive: Aref Salem
- Headquarters: 800, rue de la Gauchetiere Ouest; Montreal, Quebec; H5A 1J6
- Website: stm.info

Operation
- Began operation: 1951; 75 years ago (as CTM); 1970; 56 years ago (as CTCUM); 1985; 41 years ago (as STCUM); 2002; 24 years ago (as STM)

The Société de transport de Montréal (French pronunciation: [sɔsjete də tʁɑ̃spɔʁ də mɔ̃ʁeal], STM; lit. 'Montreal Transit Corporation') is a public transport agency that operates transit bus and rapid transit services in the urban agglomeration of Montreal, Quebec, Canada. Established in 1861 as the "Montreal City Passenger Railway Company", it has grown to comprise four subway lines with a total of 68 stations, as well as 221 bus routes and 23 night routes. The STM was created in 2002 to replace the Société de transport de la communauté urbaine de Montréal (STCUM; lit. 'Montreal Urban Community Transit Corporation'). The STM operates the second most heavily used urban mass transit system in Canada. As of 2023, the average daily ridership is 1,745,700 passengers: 686,300 by bus, 1,063,500 by rapid transit and 13,100 by paratransit service.

== History ==
Logo as the STCUM, using the historical T-Arrow logo from 1951 until 2010

Several other public transport companies existed prior to the creation of the STM. From 1861 to 1886, the Montreal City Passenger Railway Company operated a small network of horse-drawn trams (also called streetcars in North America).

In 1886, the company changed its name to the Montreal Street Railway Company. The first electric tram appeared in 1892 and was nicknamed "the Rocket". The company underwent another name change in 1893: MSTR became the MTR for Montreal Island Beltline Railway. A year later, the network was fully electrified and in 1894, the last horse-drawn tram was taken out of service. From 1910 to 1911, the company was named Montreal Public Service Corporation before changing again to Montreal Tramways Company.

Although they were put into service in 1919, buses only began to be widely used starting in 1925, with the creation of several regular lines. Then in 1937, the first trolley buses were used. In 1939, the company had 929 trams, 224 buses and 7 trolley buses, serving about 200 million passengers per year. The replacement of tram lines by buses began in 1951, when a law was passed by the provincial government that transferred the overall management of transport in Montreal to a public organization, the Commission de transport de Montréal (CTM). The last tram was withdrawn from service in 1959.

The Montreal Metro was inaugurated in 1966; this year also saw the end of trolley bus service.

The CTM became the Commission de transport de la communauté urbaine de Montréal (CTCUM) in January 1970, and in 1985, rebranded itself again, becoming the Société de Transport de la Communauté Urbaine de Montréal (STCUM). Commuter trains ceased to be managed by the STCUM in 1996 and responsibility for this service was transferred to the newly created Agence métropolitaine de transport.

It was not until January 1, 2002, at the time of the merger of Montreal with other municipalities on the Island of Montreal, that the Société de transport de Montreal was created, taking the place of the STCUM.

By 2025, tensions between the STM and its employees grew and a series of successive union-led strikes were launched. On June 9, 2025, 2,400 STM maintenance workers involved with the Syndicat du transport de Montréal (CSN) launched a nine-day strike. On September 5, 2025, it was agreed that the 2,400 STM maintenance employees who are CSN members would cease working overtime for at least two weeks starting September 22, 2025, launching a second strike lasting two weeks. On November 1st, the 2,400 STM maintenance employees who are CSN members voted to cease working overtime for the entire month of November, though through union negotiations and tremendous external pressure, this strike was called off on November 11th. Transit operators (union SCFP 1983) voted to strike on Saturday November 1st as well, but their planned strike, on November 15-16, which called for 48 hours of complete public transit shutdown, was called off at the 11th hour. A third striking union, planned to strike on the 19th of November, 2025, reached a deal on November 17th.

Past transit operators
Name	Abbreviation	Start date	Finish date	Remarks
Société de transport de la communauté urbaine de Montréal	STCUM	June 20, 1985	December 31, 2001	Dissolution of the Montreal Urban Community
Commission de transport de la communauté urbaine de Montréal	CTCUM	January 1, 1970	June 19, 1985	Creation of the Montreal Urban Community
Commission de transport de Montréal	CTM	June 16, 1951	December 31, 1969	Municipal corporation formed to take over assets of MTC
Montreal Tramways Company	MTC	March 24, 1911	June 15, 1951	New privately held corporation from merger from MSR, MPIR, and Montreal Terminal Railway Company
Montreal Street Railway Company	MSR	June 21, 1886	March 23, 1911	New name for MCPR
Montreal Park and Island Railway	MPIR	December 27, 1893	March 23, 1911	Privately held corporation; controlling interest acquired by MSR in 1901; merged into MTCo in 1911.
Montreal City Passenger Railway Company	MCPR	May 18, 1861	June 20, 1886	Privately held corporation; horse-drawn street railway service began November 27, 1861.

=== Streetcars ===
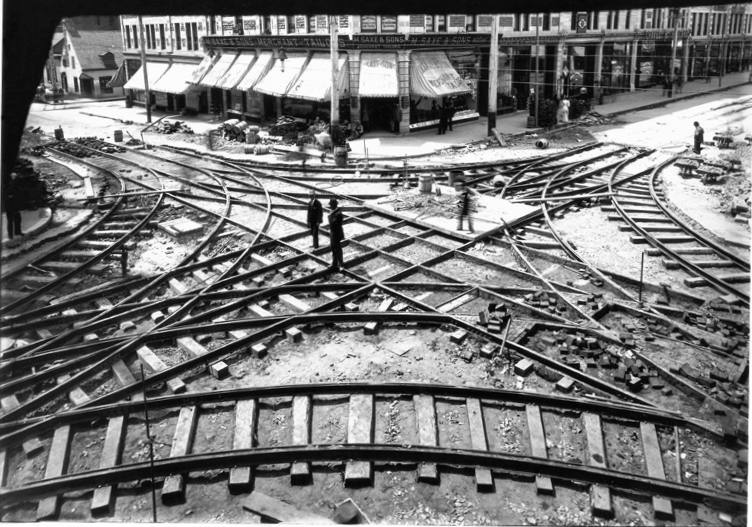
Tramway crossing under construction at Ste. Catherine and St. Lawrence in 1893

From 1861 to 1959, Montreal had an extensive streetcar system. The streetcar network had its beginnings with the horsecar era of the Montreal City Passenger Railway in 1861. That private company would become the Montreal Street Railway in 1886 and the Montreal Tramways Company in 1911. The assets of the company were taken over by the city-owned Montreal Transportation Commission in 1951.

=== Regional transit service ===
The STM was formerly involved in the operation of regional transit services. The first such service was a set of bus routes inherited from the October 1980 expropriation of a private bus company called Metropolitan Provincial (1967) Inc. These regional bus routes operated from downtown Montreal to the western part of the Island of Montreal, as well as to off-island points located west, southwest, and northeast of the Island of Montreal. By the end of 1985, the STM (then known by the initials CTCUM) had exited the regional bus business to focus on its core territory (the Island of Montreal). Most of the regional bus routes were passed to private operators who provided services under contract to newly formed intermunicipal transit councils.

The second regional service involved the management of two commuter train lines. On July 1, 1982, the CTCUM and the Canadian National Railway (CN) entered into an agreement to integrate the Montreal-Deux Montagnes commuter train line into the regular CTCUM bus and Metro network. The CTCUM paid CN to staff, run, and maintain the trains, while it set the fares and schedules. Passengers travelling within the CTCUM operating territory were able to transfer between the trains and the bus or Metro, with no fare supplement required to make a bus- or Metro-to-train transfer. On October 1, 1982, a similar agreement with the Canadian Pacific Railway (CP) went into effect, and CP's Montreal-Rigaud commuter train line was integrated into the CTCUM network.

On January 1, 1996, responsibility for the commuter trains was transferred to the Agence métropolitaine de transport (AMT) (now Exo), a Quebec provincial government agency formed to coordinate all public transportation in the metropolitan Montreal region.

== Services ==
=== Fares ===
Fares for bus and Metro services offered by the STM fall within the fare structure of the Autorité régionale de transport métropolitain (ARTM). The STM operates in Zone A, with the exception of Metro stations in Laval and Longueuil, which fall in Zone B. Passengers leaving the island of Montreal are expected to keep proof of payment of a paid fare that covers zones A and B.

Beyond standard ARTM fares, the STM area has the following particularities:

- Bus line 747 YUL–Montreal–Trudeau Airport has a special price of CA$11.25 that operates like a 24-hour all-modes Zone A. Other time-based all-modes fares (such as a monthly pass) are also accepted on this line.
- Residents of the Agglomeration of Montreal (coterminal with Zone A) aged 65 or older are entitled to a "Free 65+ All Modes A fare".

As of February 2022, the STM does not accept cash at Metro stations (cash is only accepted for bus fares); only debit and credit cards can be used to purchase tickets. Children between 6 and 17 years old, students 18 and over and seniors aged 65 and over have access to reduced fares.

Tickets and cash fares allow an unlimited number of uninterrupted transfers in a given direction for up to 120 minutes. Tickets and passes are validated at entry in the front of the bus or in the Metro. Certain articulated buses allow rear entry with validators at the back of the vehicle.

==== Opus ====
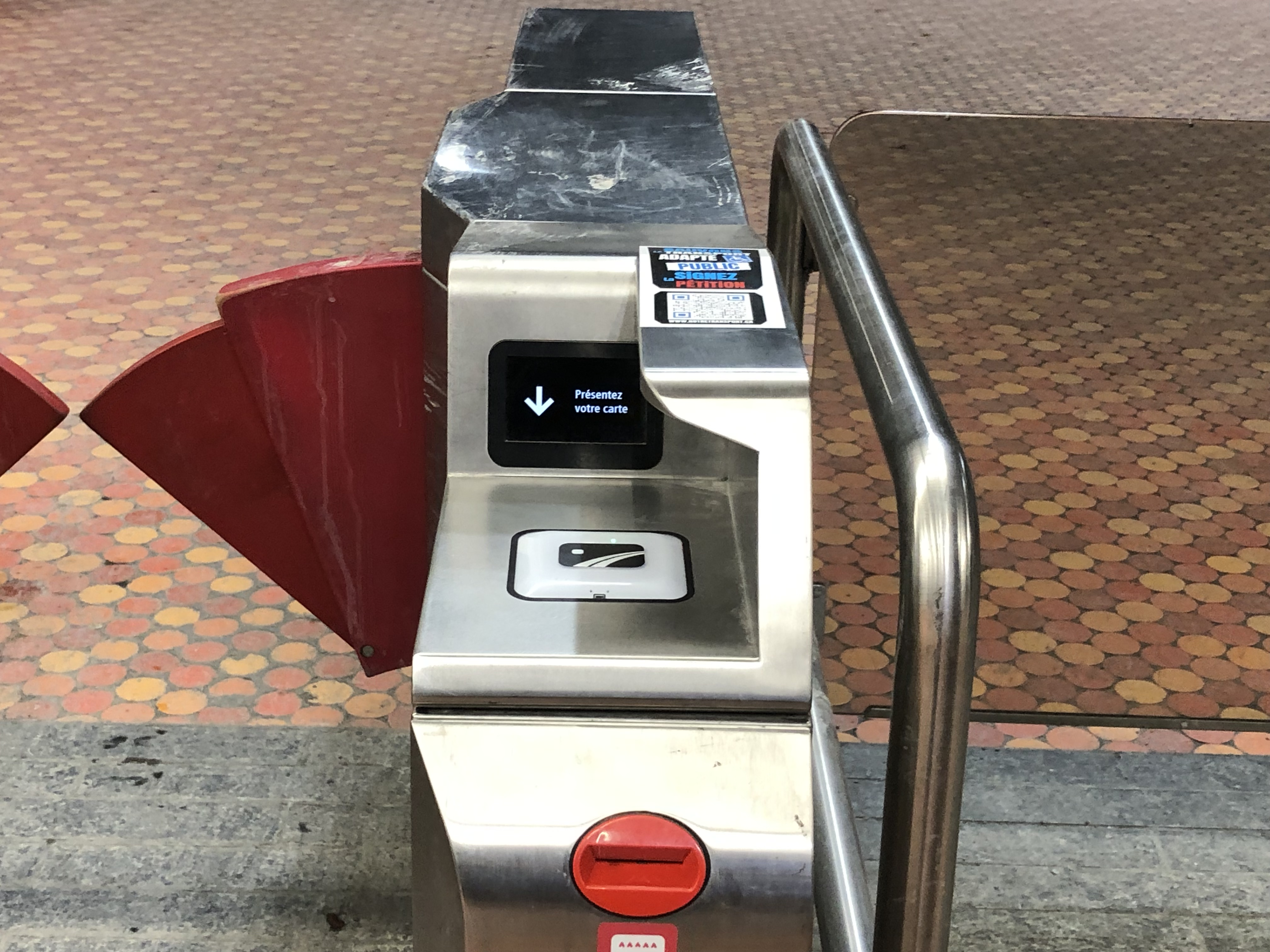
An Opus card reader located at Lionel-Groulx Metro Station

On April 21, 2008, the STM unveiled the contactless smart card called Opus (a word that phonetically includes the French word puce, which is the generic French word for the chip used in any type smart card) as a means of fare payment. In preparation for this new step in Montreal's public transportation network, turnstiles which incorporate the reader and automated vending machines had already been installed in Metro stations; buses had previously been fitted with new fare boxes that incorporated the card reader in order to ensure the uniformity of methods of payment across Montreal's transit network and that of its suburbs.

Costs to the STM related to the project were approximately CA$138 million, compared to the original estimated cost of some $100 million. The project was originally supposed to be implemented in 2006. In 2019, the STM announced plans to introduce improved Opus card readers on buses beginning in 2020 in order to enable all-door boarding and debit card payment. In 2026, the STM began rolling out virtual Opus cards that allow commuters to use their smartphones to verify fare payment. These digital fares can be purchased through the Chrono application which can also be used to load fares onto a physical Opus card. Virtual Opus card functionality in the Chrono application was rolled out to android devices in July of 2026. As of October 2026, this functionality has yet to be deployed to IPhone devices.

=== Schedules and route information ===
Each stop on each route is assigned a number and some of these systems require a user to know the number.

In 2017 the STM introduced "iBus", a real-time GPS tracking system. It includes electronic signs inside buses showing the estimated time of arrival at upcoming stops and the busiest bus stops have electronic signs showing the estimated time of arrival of the next bus.

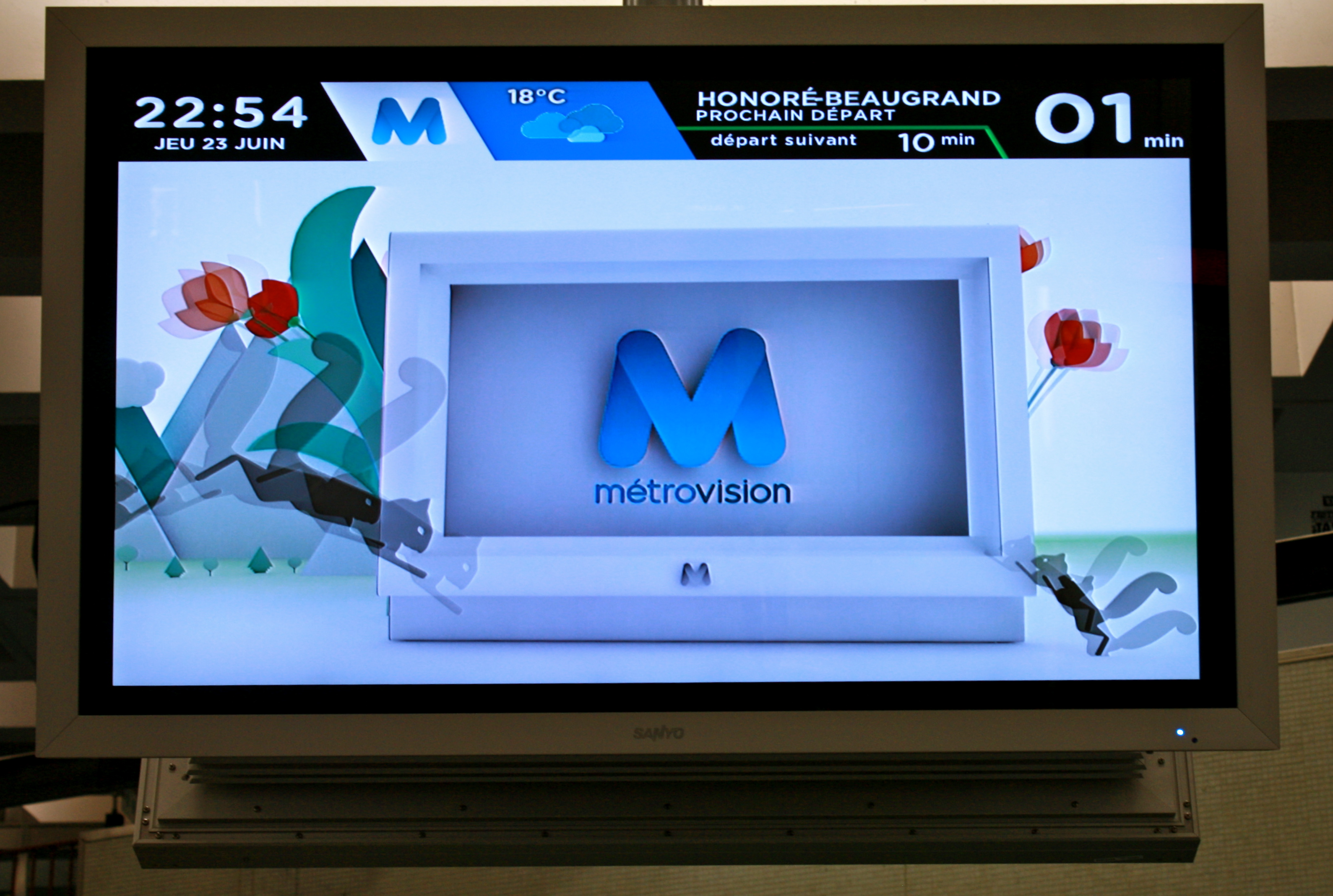
An old MétroVision screen at Place-des-Arts station

All 68 Metro stations are equipped with the MétroVision information screens which displays advertising, news headlines and weather information from MétéoMédia, as well as STM-specific information regarding service changes, service delays and information pertaining to using the system.

=== Accessibility ===
All 197 daytime bus routes and 23 night routes are wheelchair accessible. All Metro lines except the Yellow line are accessible to wheelchairs. As of May 2026, there are 30 stations with elevators installed: Angrignon, Côte-Vertu, Du Collège, Snowdon, Lionel-Groulx, Atwater, Bonaventure, Place-d'Armes, Champ-de-Mars, Berri–UQAM (orange and green lines only), Rosemont, Jean-Talon, Henri-Bourassa, Cartier, De la Concorde, Montmorency, McGill, Place-Des-Arts, Prefontaine, Honoré-Beaugrand, Jean-Drapeau, Vendôme, Viau, Pie-IX, Mont-Royal, Villa-Maria, Jolicoeur station, D'Iberville, Édouard-Montpetit, Outremont, and Place-Saint-Henri. All of the elevators can be reached from street level.

=== Connections to other transit services ===
STM is connected to surrounding transit agencies such as:

- Société de transport de Laval (STL) — City of Laval
- Réseau de transport de Longueuil (RTL) — City of Longueuil
- Réseau express métropolitain (REM) - provides light metro service to Deux-Montagnes, Laval, and Brossard.
- Exo (EXO) — provides commuter rail service to Vaudreuil-Hudson, Saint-Jérôme, Mont Saint Hilaire, Candiac and Mascouche lines; as well as a number of commuter bus and transit lines which provide service to suburban and rural areas such as Châteauguay, Salaberry-de-Valleyfield, Saint-Jean-sur-Richelieu, Saint-Hyacinthe, Sorel-Tracy, Repentigny, Terrebonne, and Saint-Jérôme.
- Via Rail — provides inter-city/inter-provincial passenger rail services throughout Canada.
- Amtrak — provides passenger rail services towards the United States.

== Safety and security ==
Since the start of Metro service in 1966, the STM (and predecessors) has had its own transit enforcement unit.

Since 2021, the transit officers are sworn as Special Constables. They now be subject to the Police Act and, consequently, the authority of the Commissaire à la déontologie policière (police ethics commissioner).

In Quebec, special constables are peace officers. Their mission is to maintain peace, order and public security, to prevent and repress crime and, according to the jurisdiction specified in their deeds of appointment, to enforce the law and municipal by-laws, and to apprehend offenders.

The Service de police de la Ville de Montréal has a Unité métro (Metro Unit) that patrols Metro trains and stations as well. This unit has been in service since 2007.

=== Incidents ===
On May 10, 2012, smoke bombs were set off at Lionel-Groulx, Jean-Talon, Préfontaine, Fabre and Pie-IX stations, resulting in evacuations of the affected stations and a complete shutdown of the Metro for over two hours. The incident was not officially linked to the 2012 Quebec student strike.

In 2009, a woman was arrested, handcuffed, searched and cited by Laval Police Service officers for allegedly not holding an escalator handrail. She was acquitted, and sued the STM. Her lawsuit was rejected by both Quebec Superior Court and the Quebec Court of Appeal. In November 2018, the Supreme Court of Canada agreed to hear her appeal and in November 2019, ruled that her arrest and subsequent search were unlawful and had violated her rights. The court also awarded her $20,000 in damages.

== Transit modes ==
=== Metro ===
The Montreal Metro rapid transit system was introduced in 1966 in preparation for the Canadian Centennial and Expo 67 World Fair in Montreal. Instead of traditional steel-wheeled trains, it is a rubber-tired metro, based on technology developed for the Paris Métro; Montreal's system was the first in the world to be entirely rubber-tired (as not all of Paris's lines use tires). The Metro system is Canada's busiest subway system in total daily passenger usage; in 2017, serving an average of 1,235,200 daily passengers on an average weekday; a figure which surpassed that of the Toronto subway and Vancouver SkyTrain. In 2016, 354 million riders (transfers not included) used the Metro.

Montreal Metro Lines
Number	Colour	Termini
1	Green	Honoré-Beaugrand – Angrignon
2	Orange	Montmorency – Côte-Vertu
4	Yellow	Berri–UQAM station – Longueuil–Université-de-Sherbrooke
5	Blue	Saint-Michel – Snowdon

=== Bus services ===
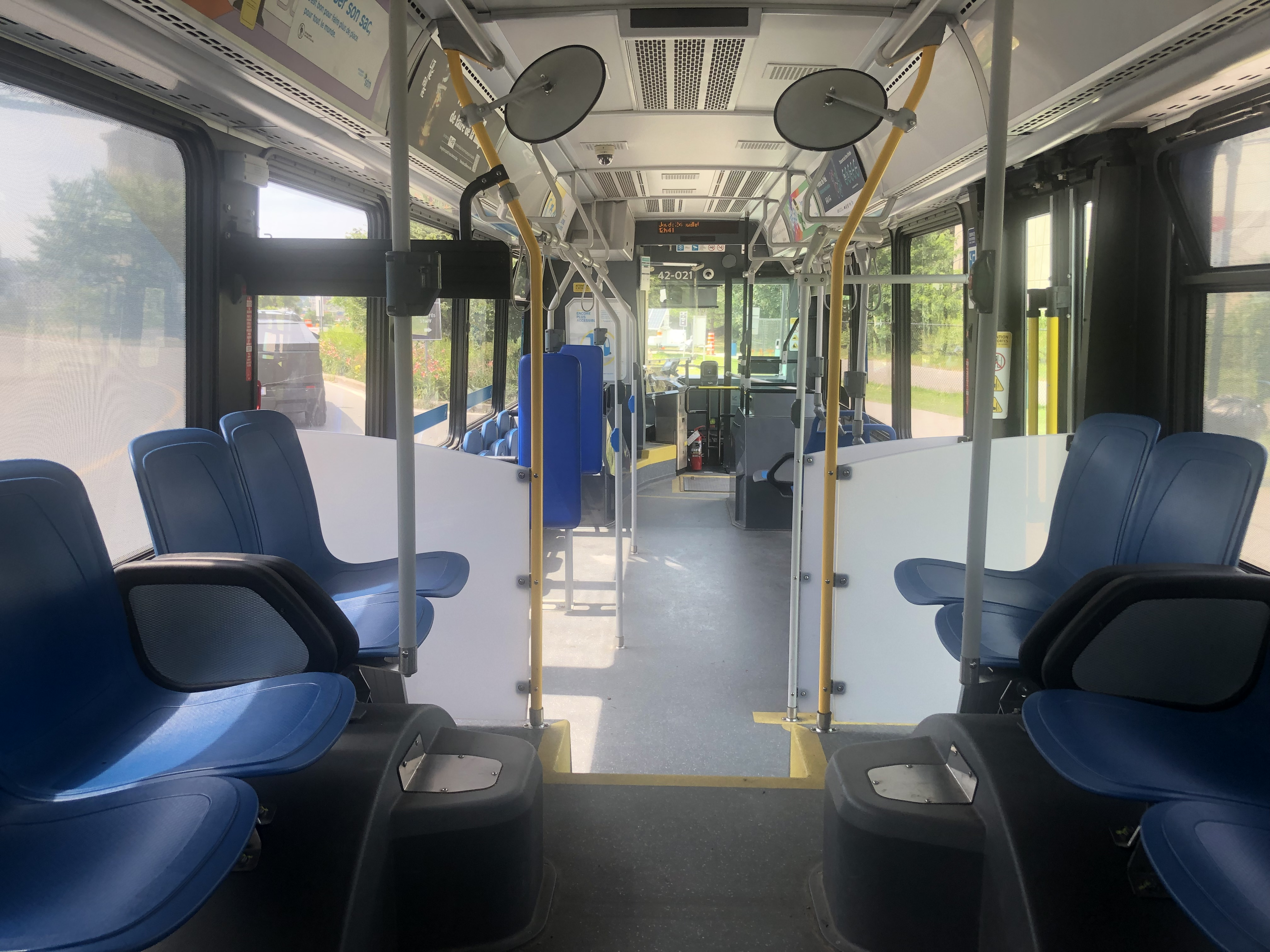
Inside an STM Nova Bus LFS HEV

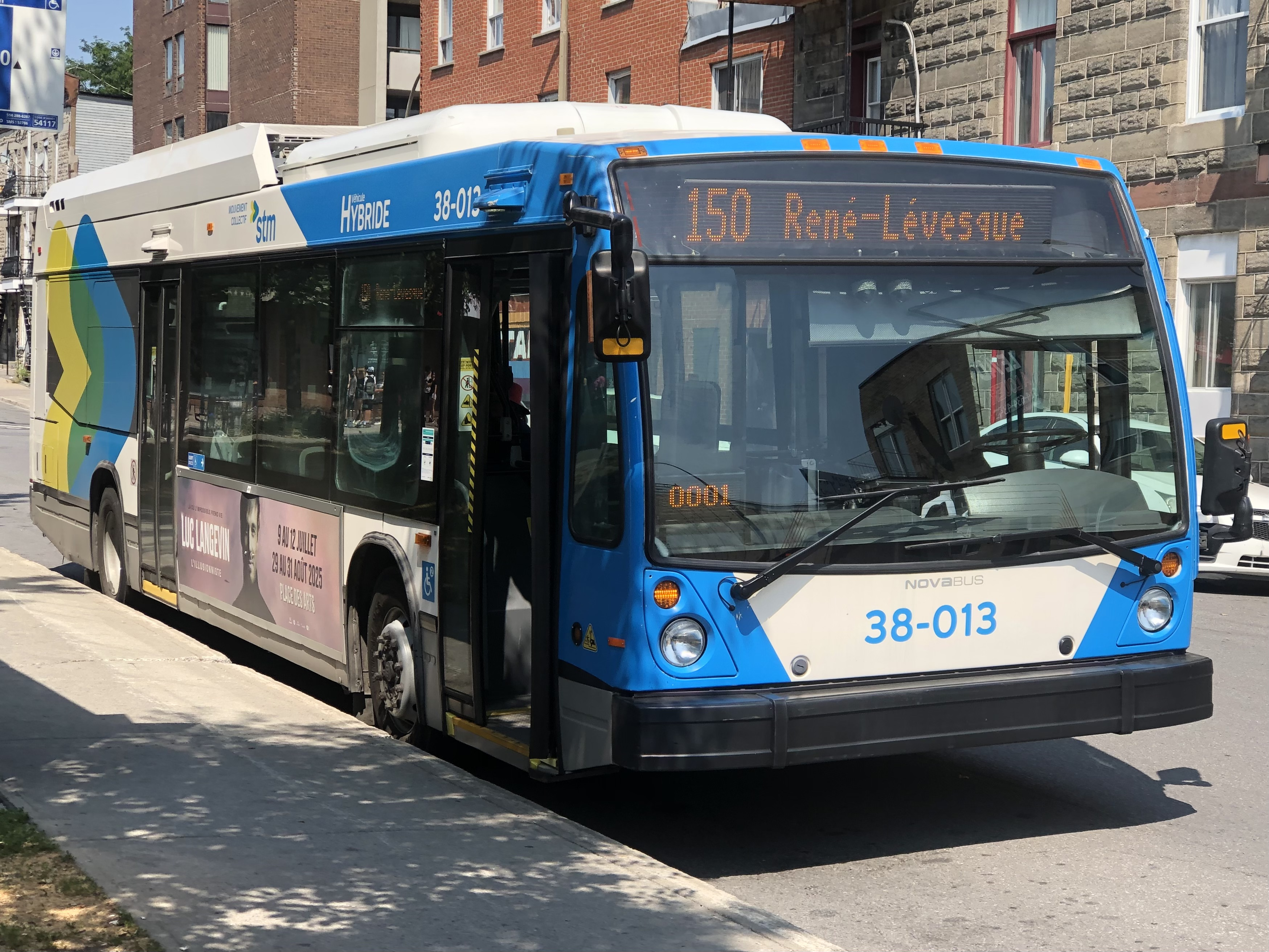
An STM hybrid bus on the 150 route

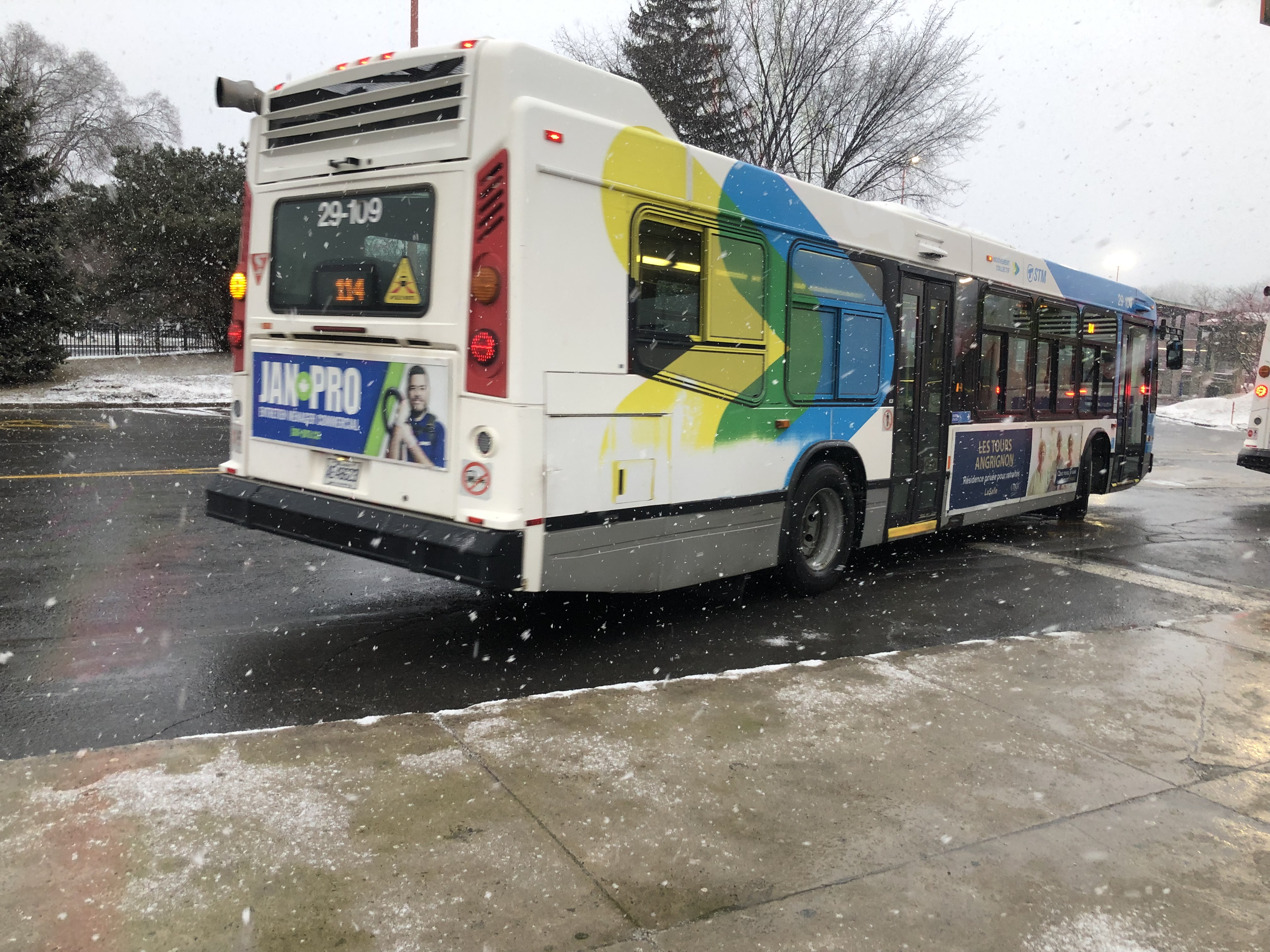
Back of a STM bus on the 114 route

The STM bus service operates well over 200 bus routes serving a number of different markets. These routes serve an average of 1,403,700 daily passengers each weekday.

- Local network routes, numbered 10–249, generally operate seven days per week, from 5:00 am to 1:00 am. Some routes offer decreased services on weekends and holidays. Within this classification, some routes operate only at peak hours Monday through Friday, and sometimes only in peak directions. The Navettes Or, numbered above 250, are specifically designed to serve the needs of senior citizens.
- All-night network routes, with route numbers from 350 to 399, generally operate from 1:00 am to 5:00 am, seven days per week, at a maximum headway of 45 minutes. Some routes offer increased service early on Saturday and Sunday ("late" on Friday and Saturday).
- Express Network routes, numbered 400–499, are limited-stop routes. Some routes are classified as Metrobus, and Trainbus and are geared to deliver commuters to specific Metro and commuter train stations, although these designations are no longer in use. Most Express routes operate only at peak hours Monday through Friday, and sometimes only in peak directions.
- Shuttle Network routes, numbered 700–799, are special-purpose routes serving Canadiens hockey games, tourist areas like Old Montreal and La Ronde, as well as the 747 route running 24/7 between downtown and Montréal–Pierre Elliott Trudeau International Airport.

On August 30, 2010, the STM introduced the "10 Minutes Max" network. This network, overlaid on both the local and express networks described above, schedules buses at a maximum headway of 10 minutes, between 6 a.m. and 9 p.m., Monday to Friday, on 31 of the STM's busiest bus routes. A few routes support that maximum headway only in the customary peak direction mornings and afternoons, while some routes outside of the advertised network attain similarly short headways but within shorter periods. However, on January 6, 2023, the STM announced it planned to permanently end all "10 Minutes Max" routes due to budget cuts and constraints caused by the COVID-19 pandemic and a decline in ridership.

In the early 2010s, the STM announced a plan to convert its entire fleet of buses over to electric power by 2025. Beginning in 2012, all STM bus purchases will be either hybrids or electric. STM began to pilot the use of electric buses in 2014. From 2025, STM plans to only order electric buses, after extensive testing confirmed that buses could handle Montréal's cold winters.

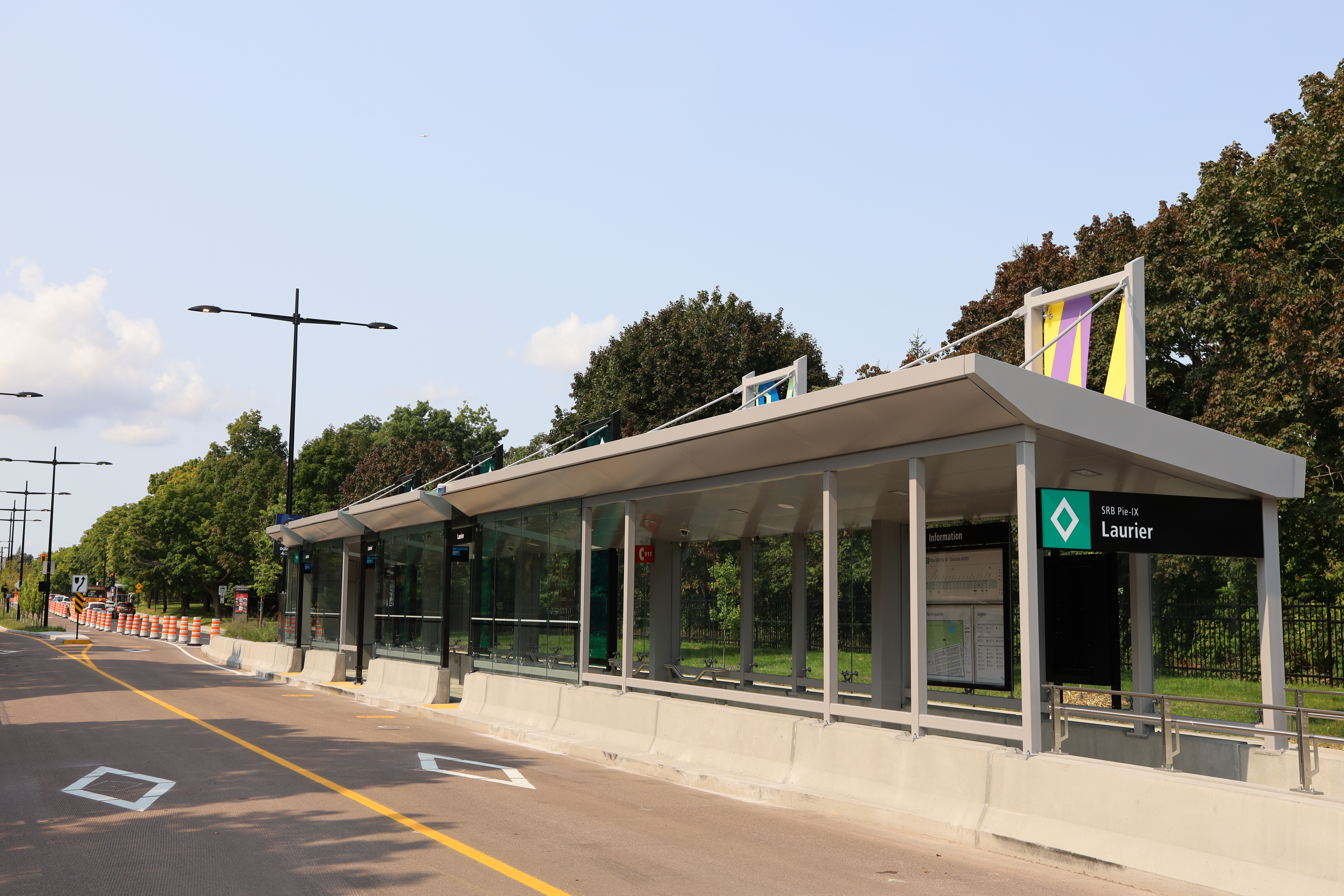
Laurier Pie-IX BRT station

==== Pie-IX BRT ====
After an initial attempt in the 1990s, a bus rapid transit (BRT) line opened on Pie-IX Boulevard in November 2022. It uses dedicated lanes, has priority at intersections and has all-door boarding to increase capacity and improve reliability on the corridor.

=== Taxibus ===
The STM also operates ten taxibus lines where the creation of regular bus service is not feasible. Regular STM fares apply, except that no cash is accepted.

- Baie-d'Urfé, connecting to Baie-d'Urfé commuter railway station
- Stewart Hall, connecting to various locations in Pointe-Claire
- Île-des-Soeurs, connecting to Place du Commerce
- Lachine, connecting to Lachine commuter railway station
- L'Île-Bizard, connecting to bus route 407 Express Île-Bizard
- Norman, connecting Lachine's residential neighborhoods to the industrial area north of Highway 20
- Lachine Industrial Park, connecting to Dorval commuter railway station
- Phillips Avenue (Senneville), connecting to bus route 419 Express John Abbott
- Sainte-Anne-de-Bellevue, Sainte-Marie district, connecting to Sainte-Anne-de-Bellevue commuter railway station
- Senneville, connecting to Sainte-Anne-de-Bellevue commuter railway station
- Montreal Technoparc, connecting to Sunnybrooke commuter railway station

=== Paratransit service ===
The Société de Transport de Montréal operates a paratransit service for people with mobility problems. The lack of subway accessibility is critical for people whose mobility needs cannot be accommodated by stairs. STM's adapted transit is a system based on reservation, meaning that there is no room for flexibility. All trips must be booked at least one day in advance.

Service began in April 1980. More than 12,000 trips were made through this service daily. On February 6, 2025, the Société de transport de Montréal has decided to transfer its paratransit service to external operators in 2026. As of January 2026, the service were contracted out to private operators and will be operating accessible minivans instead of buses.

== Current vehicles ==
The STM operates almost 1,850 buses in its fleet. In recent years, only one model has been used – the Nova Bus LF Series. As of 2025, the bus fleet comprises around 730 12-metre (40 ft) diesel buses, 850 12-metre (40 ft) hybrid buses, 220 19-metre (62 ft) articulated bus, and 34 electric buses (30 of which are 12-metre [40 ft] buses).

Current Société de transport de Montréal vehicles
Photo	Manufacturer	Years	Model	Remarks	Fleet numbers	Length
	Nova Bus	2007–2009	LFS	Cummins ISL Engine; Axion destination sign; Wider front door and chevron livery from 2009 onwards; In process of being retired (27-5XX and 28-XXX)	27–501 to 27–536; 28–001 to 28–132; 29–001 to 29–071	12 m (40 ft)
	Nova Bus	2009–2012	LFS	Some units equipped with bike racks.	29–072 to 29–156; 30–001 to 30–256; 31–001 to 31–237; 32–001 to 32–032	12 m (40 ft)
	Nova Bus	2009–2013	LFS-A	First articulated buses to run with the STM.	29–801 to 29–858; 30–801 to 30–882; 31–801 to 31–862; 32–801 to 32–810; 33–801 to 33–845	12 m (40 ft)
	Nova Bus	2016–2024	LFS HEV	Enter this service on June 4, 2016; Have BAE Hybridrive hybrid systems.; (40-001 to 44-034) – Features the new Luminator destination signs.; (37-055 to 44–034) – two wheelchair sets	36–001 to 36–027; 36–028 to 36–051; 37–001 to 37–107; 38–001 to 38–100; 39–001 to 39–150; 40–001 to 40–251; 41–001 to 41–129; 42–001 to 42–049; 44–001 to 44–034	12 m (40 ft)
	BYD	2019	K7M	Currently used as shuttles on field trips for schools and day camps around Montreal.; The delivery of the four midibuses was scheduled for the fourth quarter of 2019.	39–701 to 39–704	9.1 m (30 ft)
	New Flyer	2019–2020	XE40	Contact awarded approved by the city in August 2018. First-ever New Flyer buses for Société de transport de Montréal.; Since June 2020, all 30 buses are being gradually delivered.; These buses are air-conditioned.	40–901 to 40–930	12 m (40 ft)
	Nova Bus	2025	LFSe+	Electric buses; Same seat layout as the 44-0XX series; These buses will primarily involve the retirement of maximum of 45 buses (27-5xx series) and (29-8xx series) and the Cité Mobilite buses in 2025.	45–001 to 45–026	12 m (40 ft)
On order (units)
	Nova Bus	2026	LFSe+	Electric buses	46–001 to 46–074	
A 2008–2022 Ford E-Series STM bus used for the paratransit service The original STM logo on a 2008–2010 Ford F-250 A STM Transit Safety vehicle, which is a Ford Crown Victoria Police Interceptor An STM cutaway vehicle, a Ford E-350 The original STM logo and the Chevrolet Express van

== Infrastructure ==
=== Terminal ===
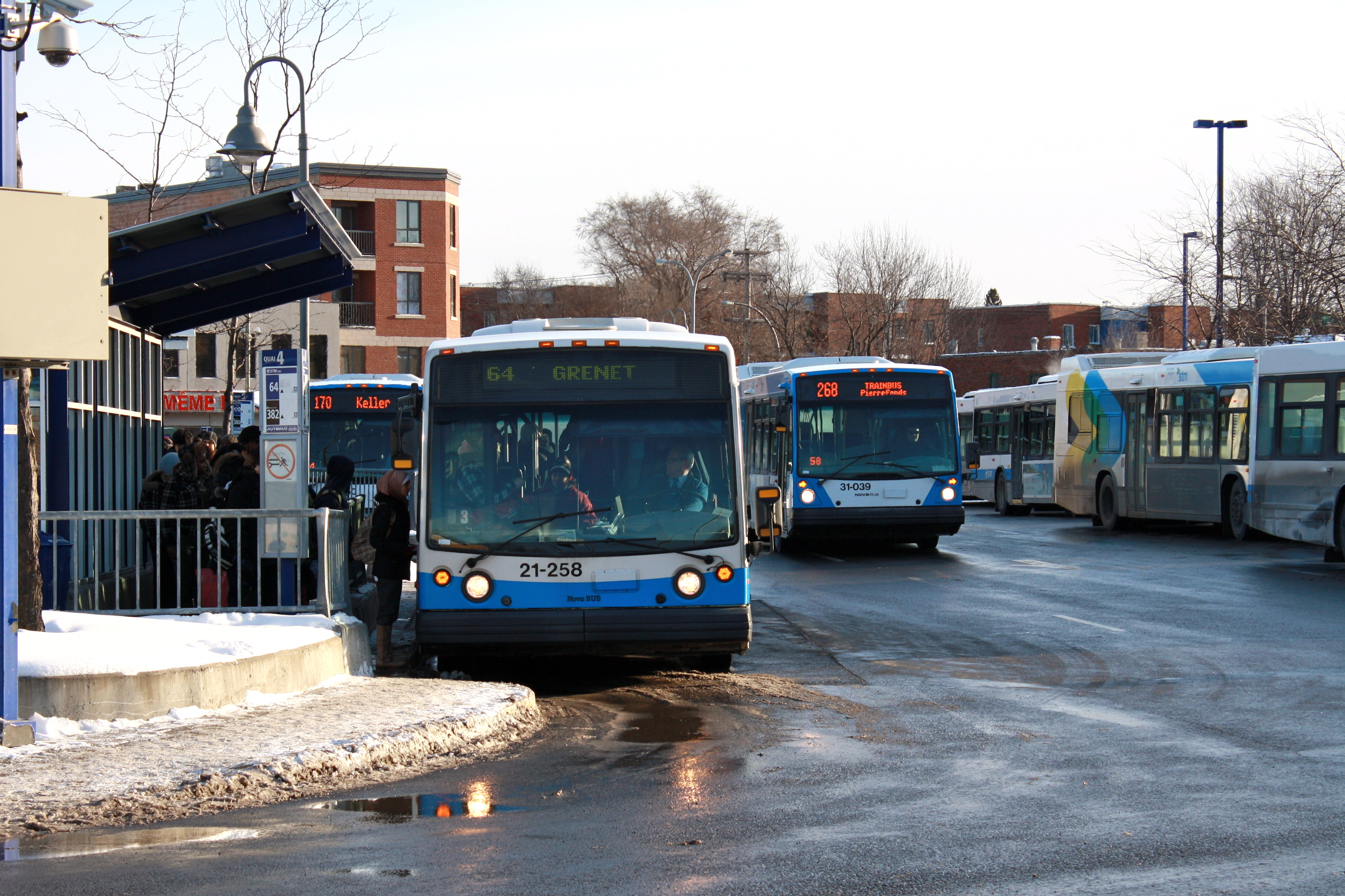
Buses loading passengers at Terminus Côte-Vertu

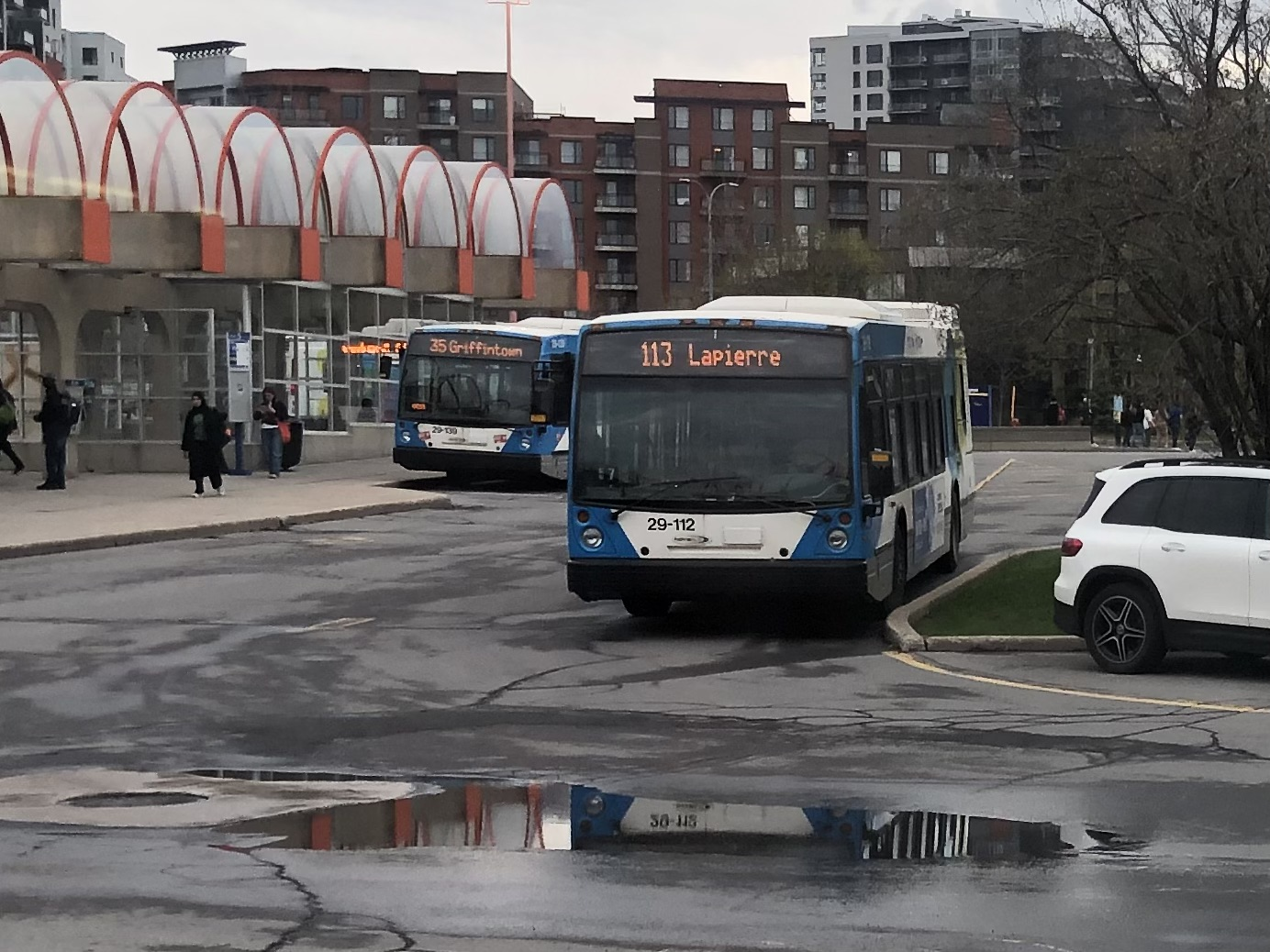
Terminus Angrignon

Most STM bus routes terminate at loops, side streets or Metro stations.

==== Regional terminals ====
- Terminus Angrignon
- Terminus Côte-Vertu
- Terminus Dorval
- Terminus Fairview
- Terminus Henri-Bourassa
- Terminus Honoré-Beaugrand
- Terminus Radisson

===== Other smaller STM loops/terminals include =====
- Terminus Anjou
- Terminus Atwater
- Terminus Jolicoeur
- Terminus Lafleur-Newman
- Terminus MacDonald
- Terminus Sherbrooke/Gouin
- Terminus Vendôme
- Terminus 100th Avenue
- Beaubien Loop
- Crémazie Loop
- Laurier Loop
- Rosemont Loop
- Villa-Maria Loop
- Du Collège Loop

=== Facilities ===
STM buses are operated out of a number of garages located around the city. They are Anjou, Bellechasse, Frontenac, LaSalle, Legendre, Mont-Royal, Stinson, St-Denis, and St-Laurent. St-Michel formally stores vehicles for Paratransit. The surface routes are divided into several divisions. Individual divisions have a superintendent, an on-duty mobile supervisor, a communications centre, and a garage facility tasked with managing the division's vehicle fleet and routes.

Metro trains are stored in the four garages at Angrignon, Beaugrand, Montmorency and Saint-Charles and there are three maintenance facilities at Duvernay, Plateau d'Youville and Viau.

=== Stops and shelters ===
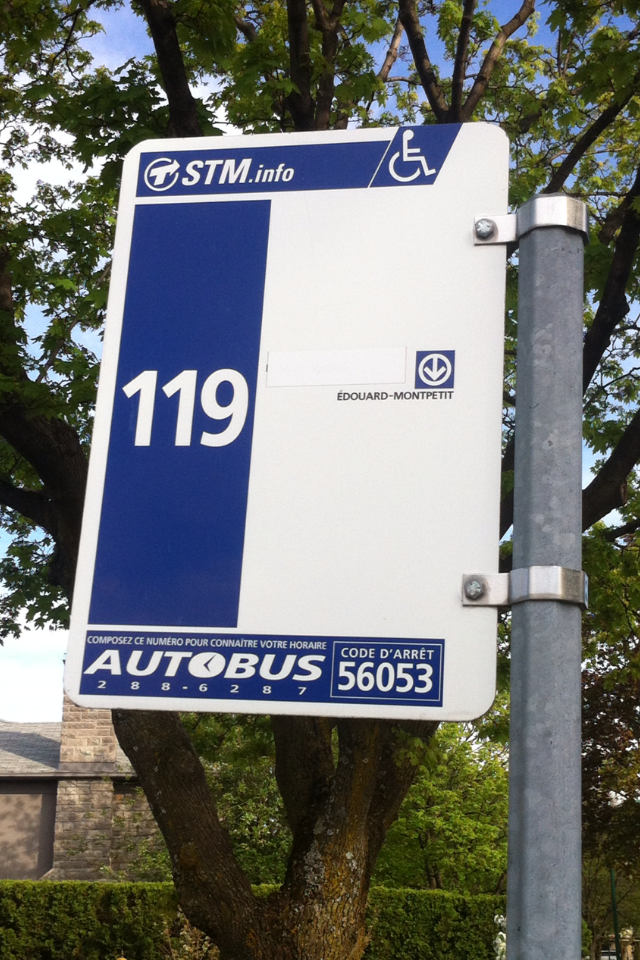
119 Rockland older stop sign

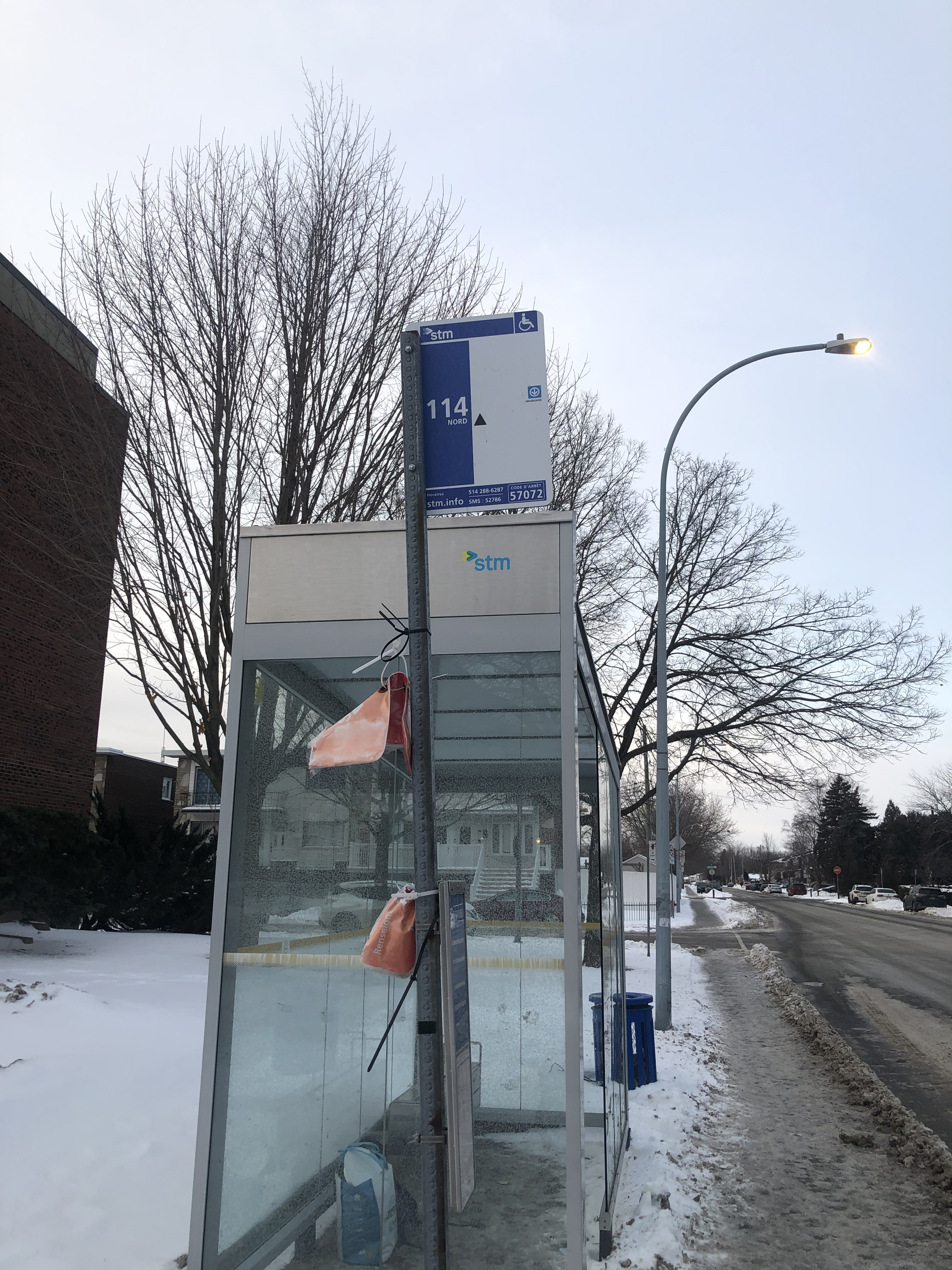
STM bus line 114 with its old stop sign and shelter

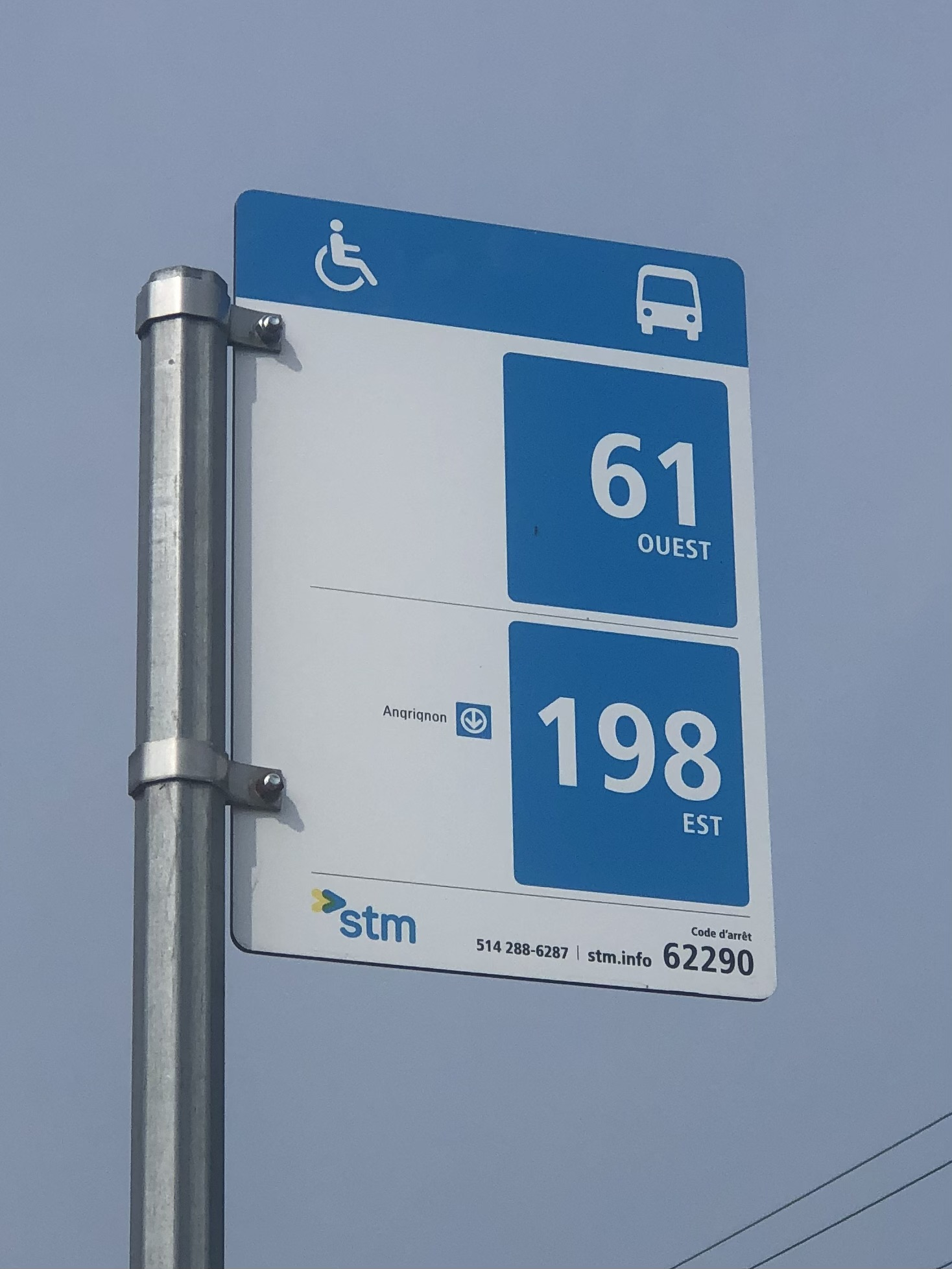
The new STM bus sign, showing routes 61 and 198

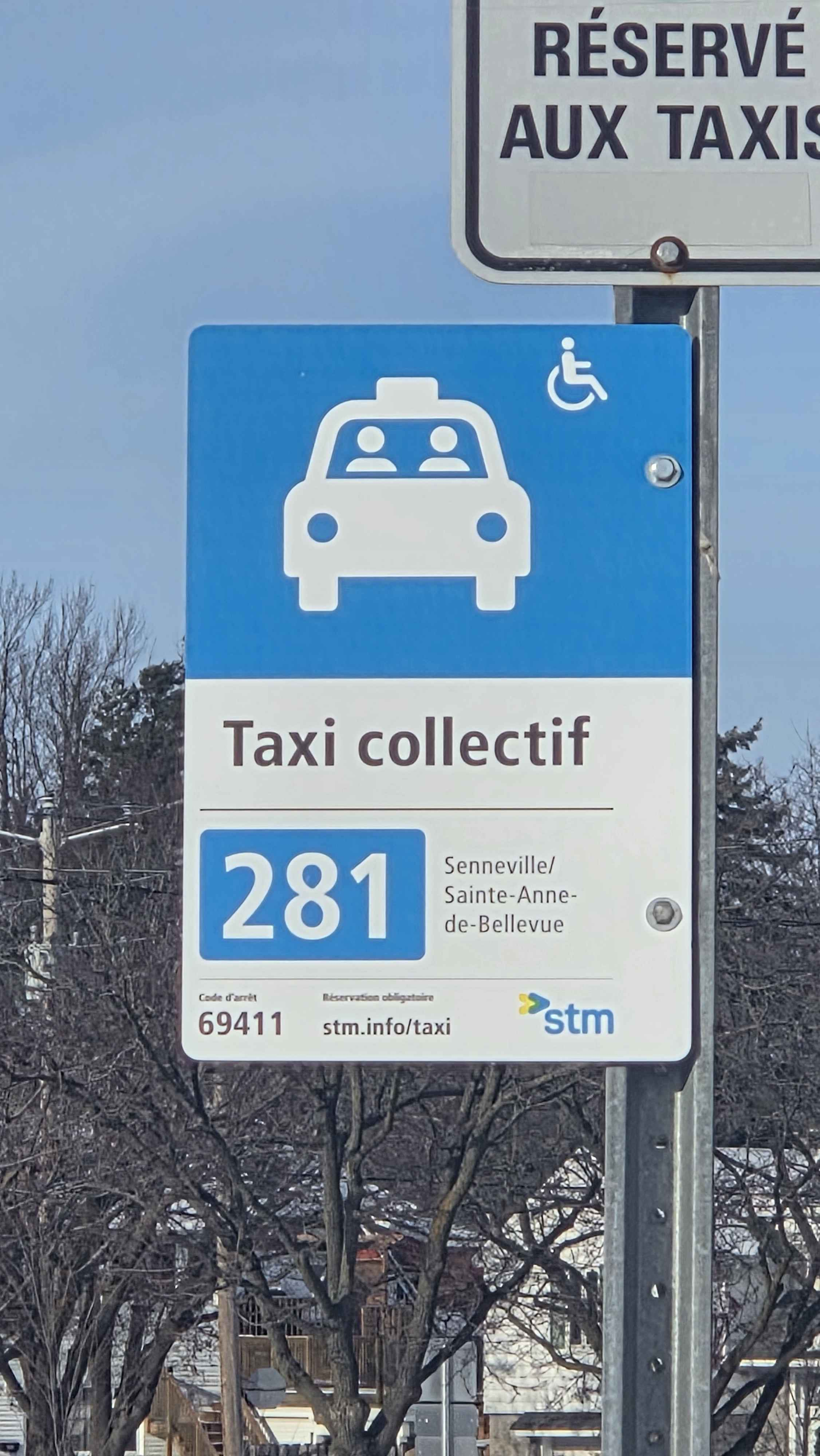
The new STM shared Taxibus sign showing routes 281

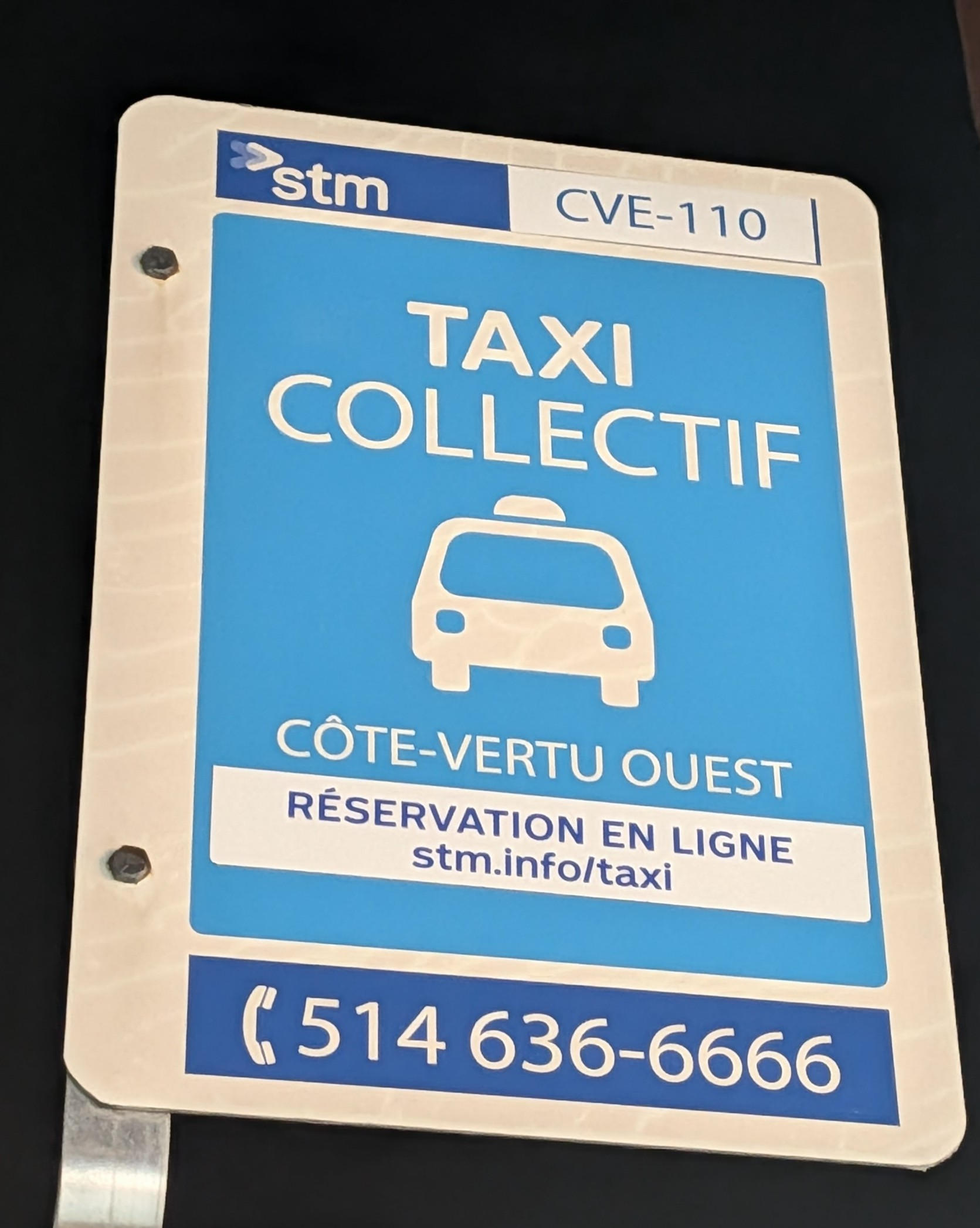
The Old STM shared Taxibus sign showing routes 282

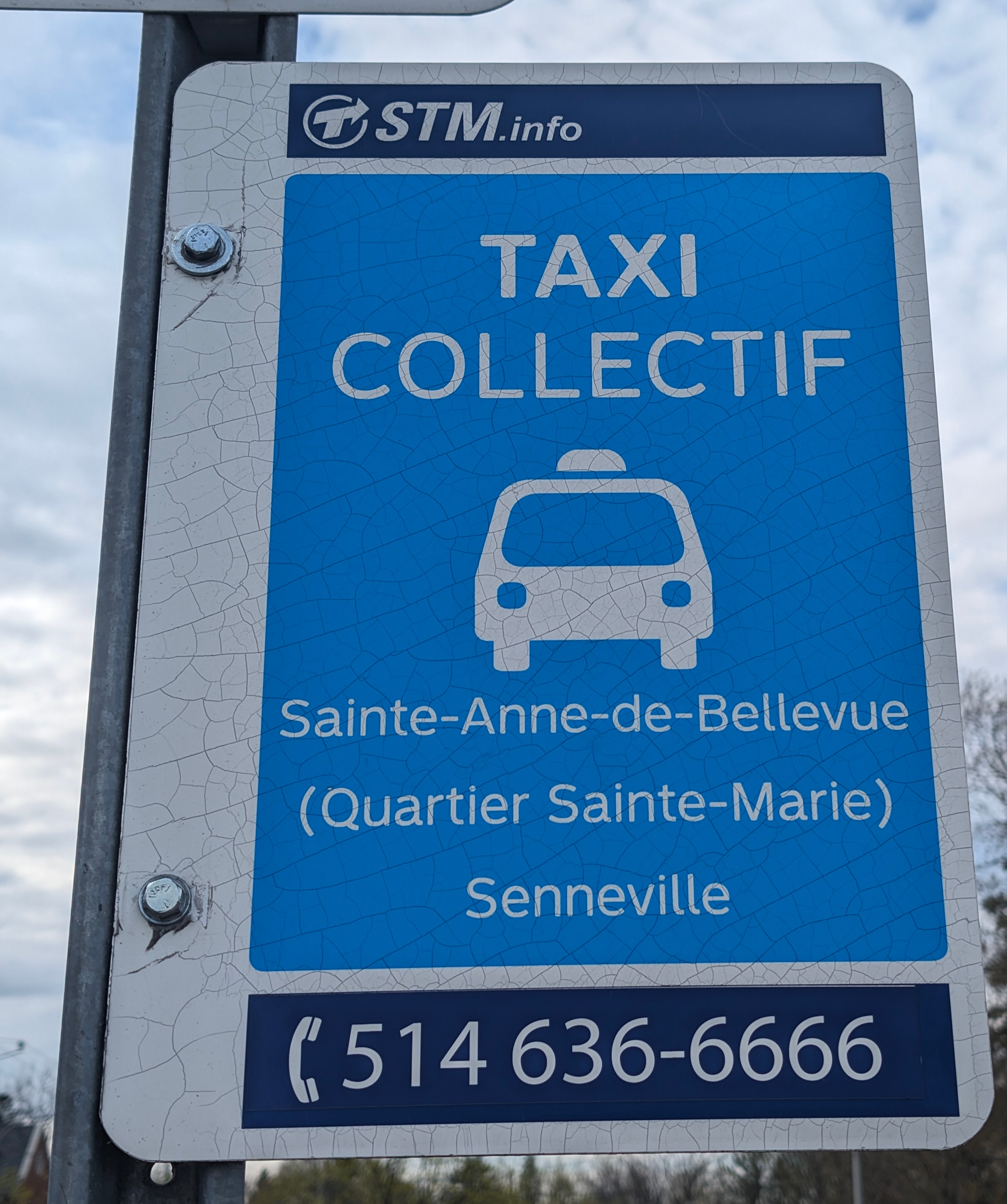
The Older (pre chevron) STM shared Taxibus sign showing routes 280&281

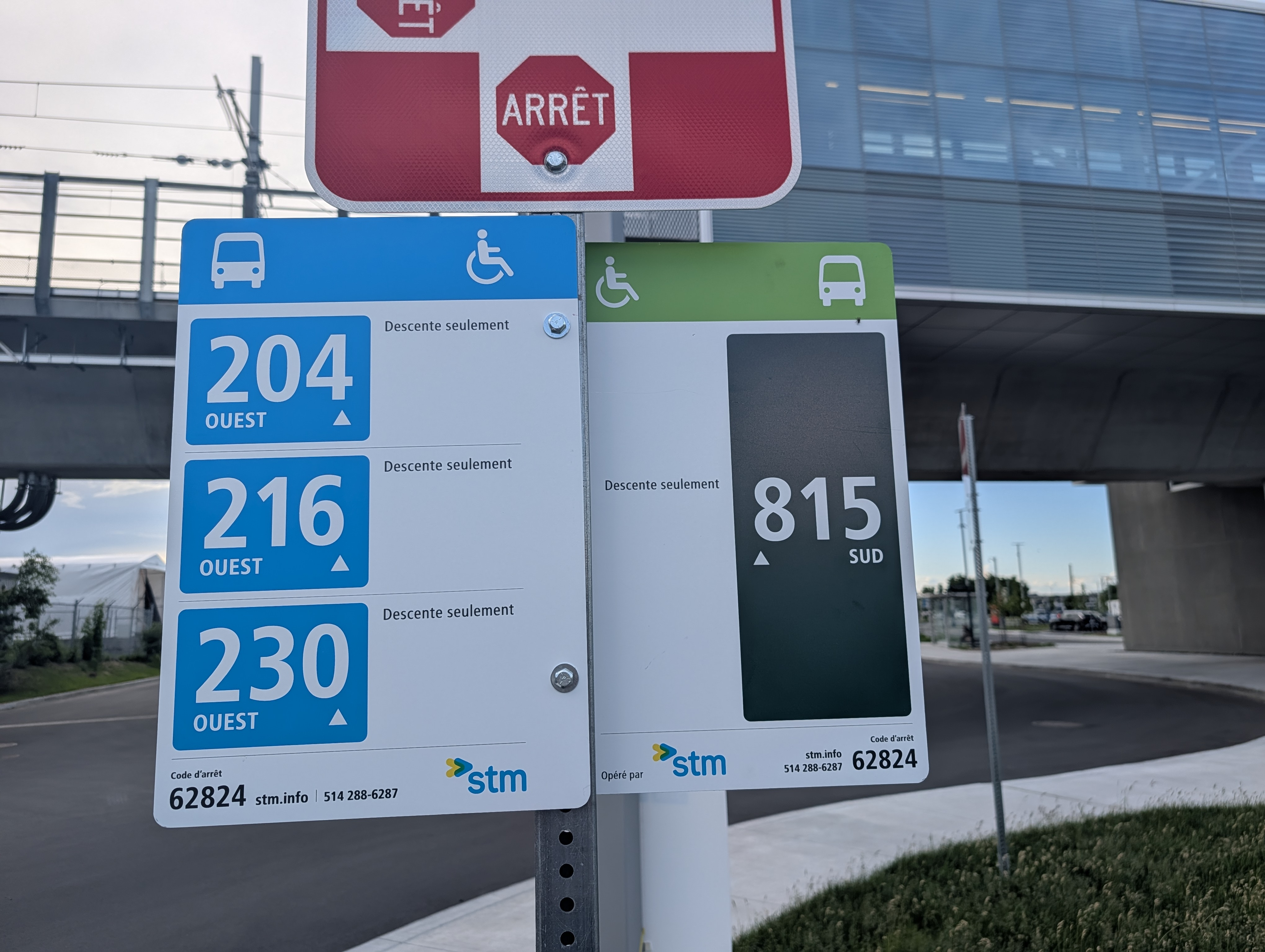
The new Metropolitan bus sign using the STM design next to a regular new STM bus sign.

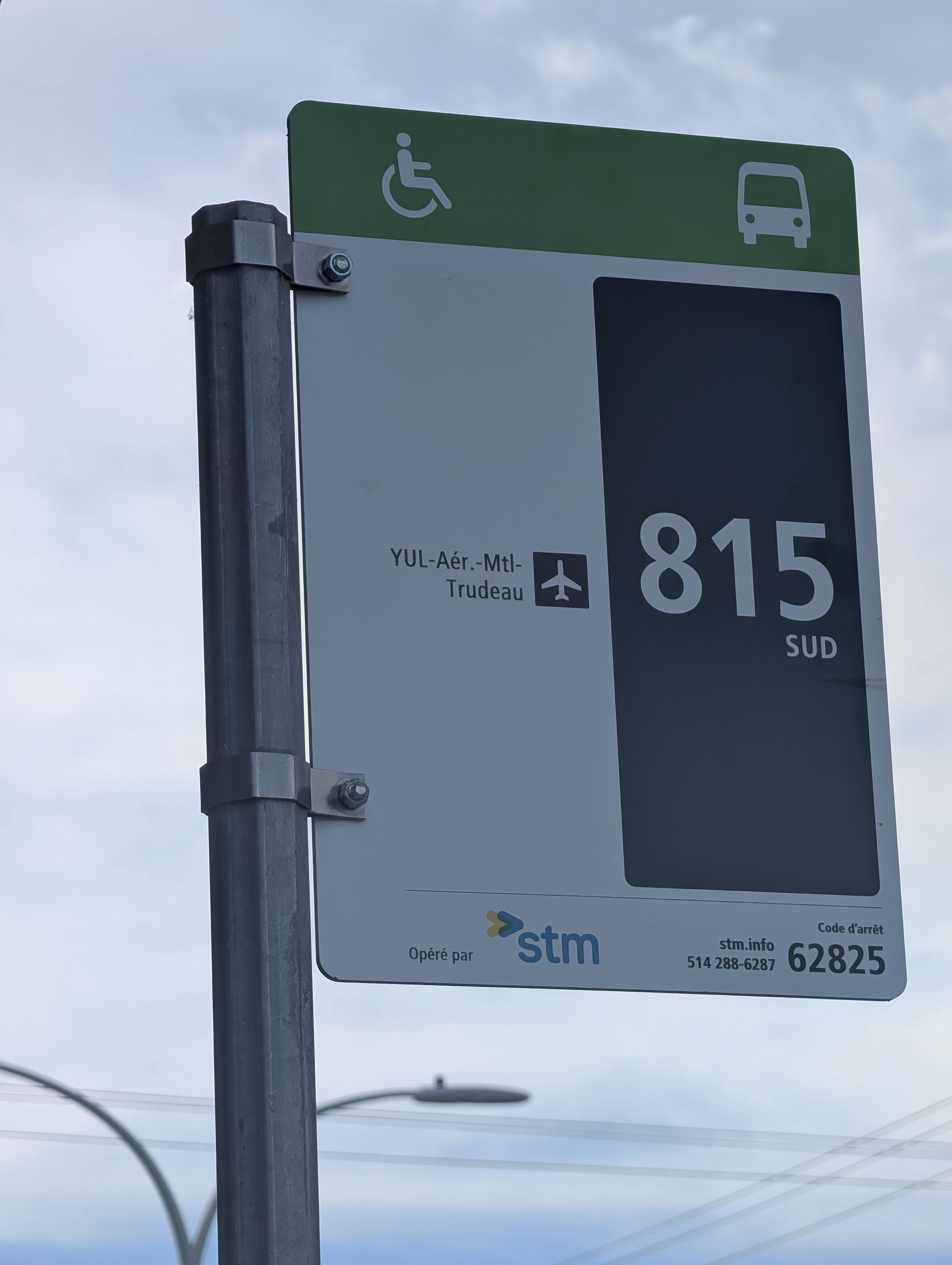
The new Metropolitan bus sign using the STM design.

There are 8,500 bus stops in the STM network. Each stop has a panel that indicates the number of routes that stops there, the type of service, if the bus goes to a Metro or train station and the bus stop code enabling one to obtain the schedule by telephone at 514-AUT-OBUS. The STM is in the process of changing all its bus stop panels to a new modern pole that displays the route numbers. The route number is colour-coded for the type of service it offers, dark blue is for regular routes, green is for express, metrobus and R-bus routes, black for night routes and gold for senior shuttles. Advertising is provided by CBS. On November 8, 2010, the STM launched 3 prototypes of modern bus shelters to replace the old ones. They will run on a solar power system and lights in the shelter are to be controlled by motion sensor. Bus shelters at high-traffic intersections feature an interactive screen where people can use hand gestures to access weather, news and bus route information. Since the introduction of GPS in the fleet, the screen can also be used to track buses on the route.

== See also ==
- Réseau express métropolitain
- Exo (public transit)
