= Snowdon, Montreal =

Snowdon
- Neighbourhood
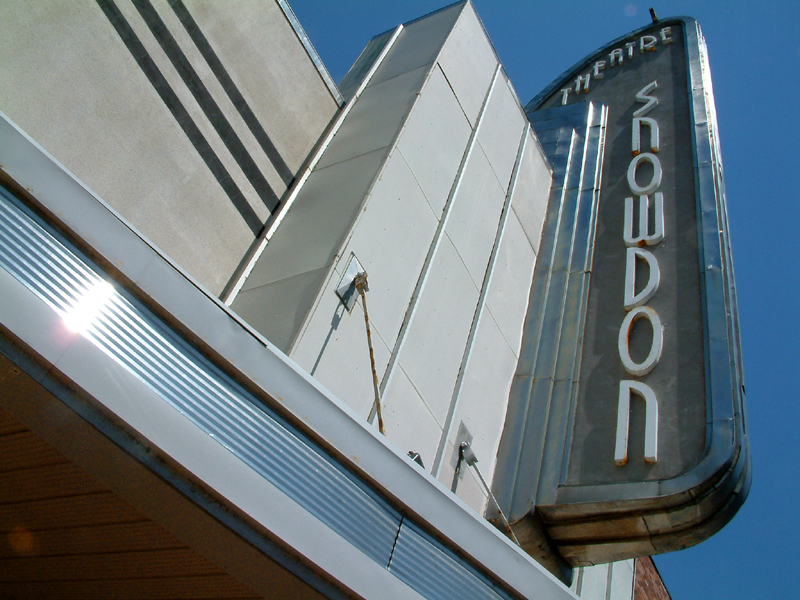
- The Snowdon Theatre is an art deco landmark in the Snowdon neighbourhood.

- Location of Snowdon in Montreal
- Coordinates: 45.483687°N 73.629107°W
- Country: Canada
- Province: Quebec
- City: Montreal
- Borough: Côte-des-Neiges–Notre-Dame-de-Grâce

Population (2006)
  - Total: 32,160
- Postal Code: H3W, H3X
- Area codes: 514, 438

Snowdon is a neighbourhood located in Montreal, Quebec, Canada. It is part of the Côte-des-Neiges–Notre-Dame-de-Grâce borough. The area is centred on the intersection of the Décarie Expressway and Queen Mary Road.

Snowdon is bordered by Macdonald Avenue (Hampstead) in the west, Victoria Avenue (Côte-des-Neiges) in the east, Côte-Saint-Luc Road (Notre-Dame-de-Grâce) to the south and Vézina Street and the railway tracks (Le Triangle) to the north. Furthermore, the northwest end borders Côte Saint-Luc and the southeast end borders Westmount.

The neighbourhood is served by the Snowdon Metro, which has access to the Metro's Orange Line and Blue Line, and by Côte-Sainte-Catherine and Plamondon stations on the Orange Line. Notable buildings in the neighbourhood include the former Snowdon Theatre.

The district was named for James Snowdon, who owned a farm where the neighbourhood now stands.

In 2024, Elie-Wiesel Park was inaugurated on de Courtrai Avenue near Décarie Boulevard and Westbury Avenue in Snowdon in honour of Elie Wiesel, the Holocaust survivor, writer, professor, and Nobel Peace Prize winner; it has a playground, relaxation area, walking trails, furniture, green spaces, and unique water features.

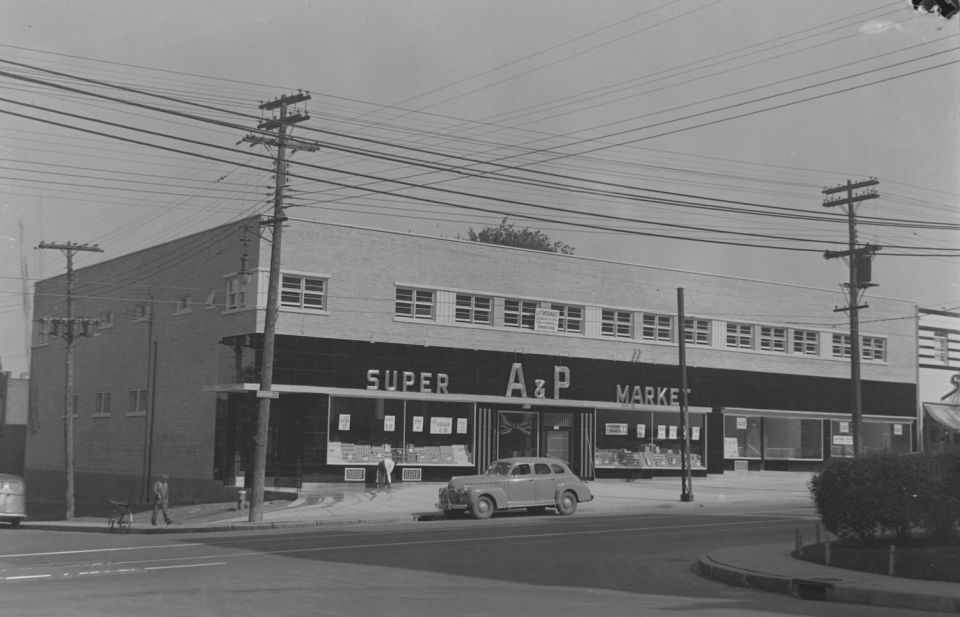
Supermarket located at 5405 Queen Mary Road in Snowdon in 1941
