= Notre-Dame-de-Grâce =

- Neighbourhood
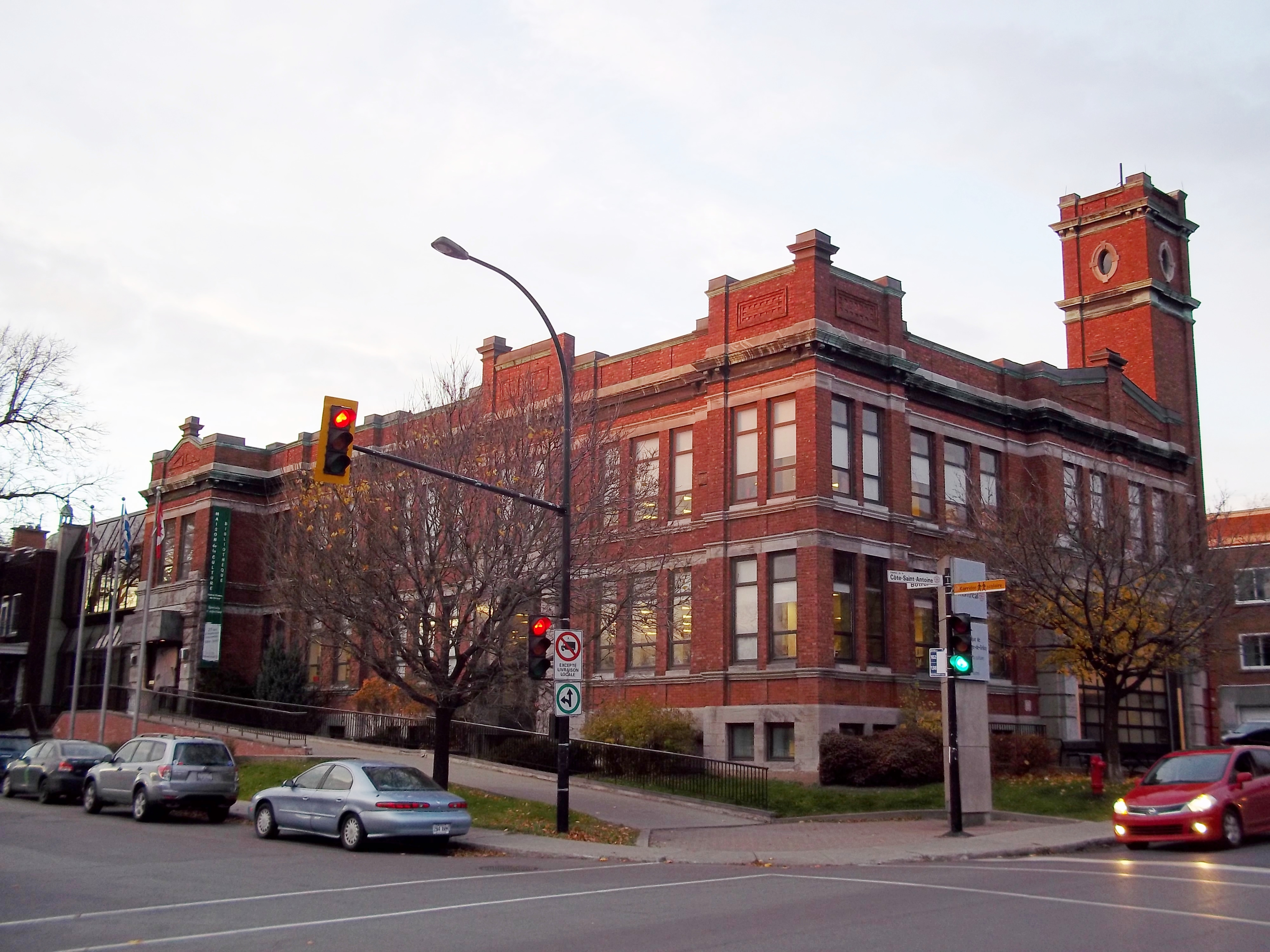
- Notre-Dame-de-Grâce Library
- Nickname: NDG
- Location of Notre-Dame-de-Grâce in Montreal
- Coordinates: 45.47675°N 73.61432°W
- Country: Canada
- Province: Quebec
- City: Montreal
- Borough: Côte-des-Neiges–Notre-Dame-de-Grâce
- Established: 1876
- Incorporated: 1906
- Merged: 1910

Area
  - Land: 8.8 km^{2} (3.4 sq mi)

Population (2021)
  - Total: 68,152
  - Density: 7,762.2/km^{2} (20,104/sq mi)
- Postal Code: H3X, H4A, H4B
- Area codes: 514, 438

Notre-Dame-de-Grâce (French: [nɔtʁə dam də ɡʁɑs], locally [nɔtʁ̥œ̈ dam dœ̈ ɡʁɑːs], lit. 'Our Lady of Grace'), commonly known as NDG, is a residential neighbourhood of Montreal in the city's West End, with a population of 68,152 (2021). An independent municipality until annexed by the City of Montreal in 1910, NDG is today one half of the borough of Côte-des-Neiges–Notre-Dame-de-Grâce. It comprises two wards, Loyola to the west and Notre-Dame-de-Grâce to the east. NDG is bordered by four independent enclaves; its eastern border is shared with the City of Westmount, Quebec, to the north and west it is bordered by the cities of Montreal West, Hampstead and Côte-Saint-Luc. NDG plays a pivotal role in serving as the commercial and cultural hub for Montreal's predominantly English-speaking West End, with Sherbrooke Street West running the length of the community as the main commercial artery. The community is roughly bounded by Claremont Avenue to the east, Côte-Saint-Luc Road to the north, Brock Avenue in the west, and Highway 20 and the Saint-Jacques Escarpment to the south.

== History ==
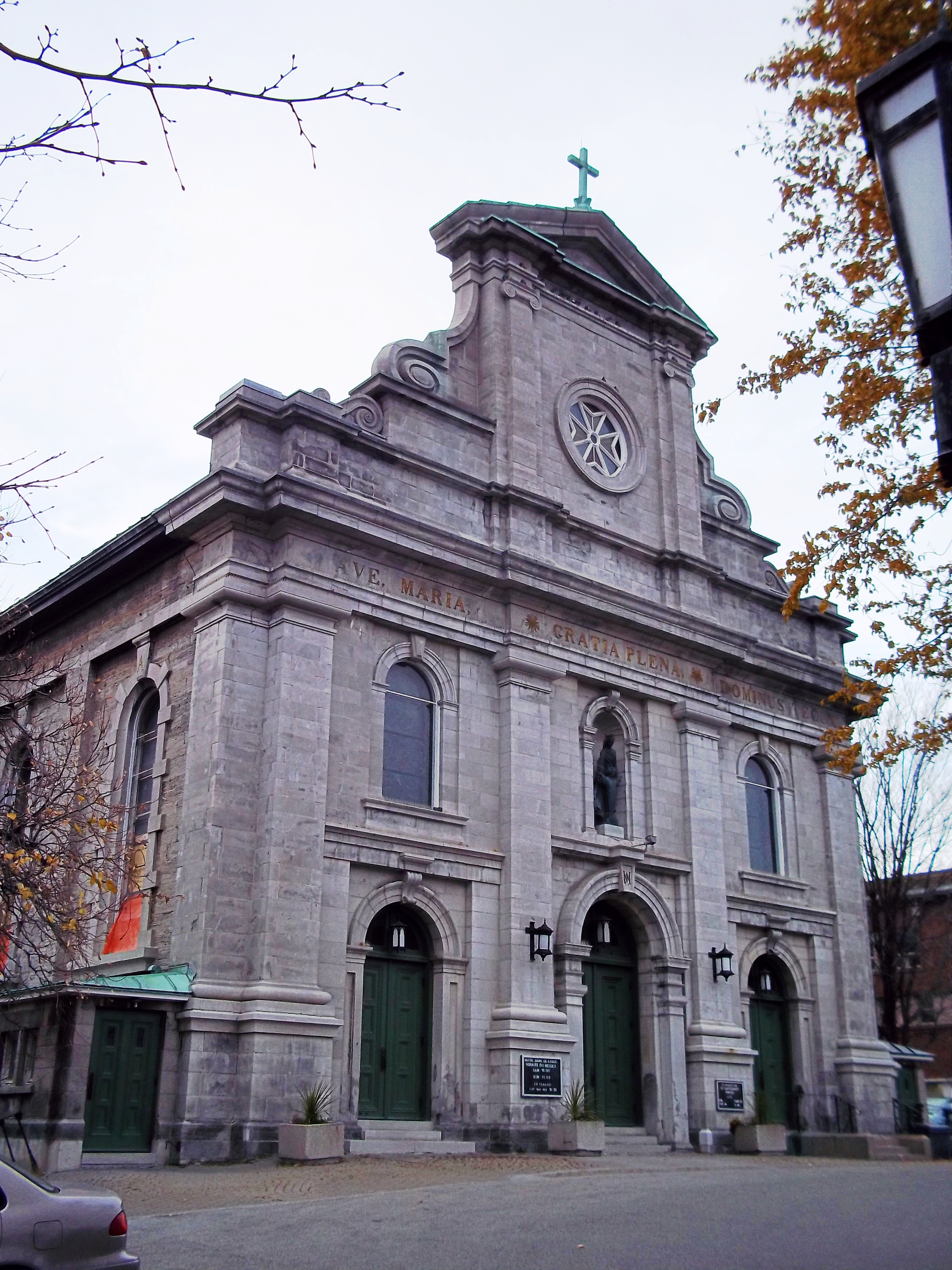
The Church of Notre-Dame-de-Grâce

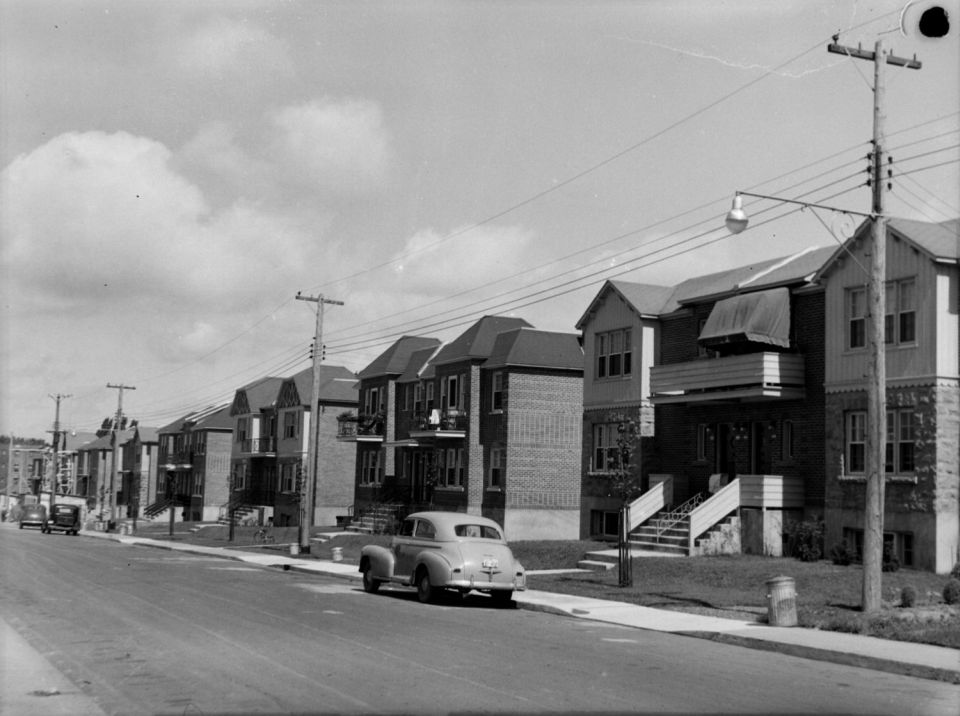
Notre-Dame-de-Grâce in 1948

At the time of Montreal's founding in 1642 most of the land stretching past Mount Royal to the northwest was a vast forest running the length of a long, narrow ridge known as the Saint Jacques Escarpment. The area that was to become Notre-Dame-de-Grâce was founded along that ridge, near a since-drained Lac Saint-Pierre. The first Europeans settled the area eight years after the founding of the colony of Ville Marie, on November 18, 1650. They were Jean Descarries (or Descaris) dit le Houx and Jean Leduc, from Igé, Perche, France.

Both settlers received 30 acres (12 ha) of land in Notre-Dame-de-Grâce, a vast territory that stretched from what would become Atwater Avenue to Lachine. The eastern part of the territory split off in 1874 as the village of Côte-Saint-Antoine, later renamed Westmount; a section then split off the western edge in 1897 to become Montreal West.

In 1853, construction of the Church of Notre-Dame-de-Grâce was completed.

In December 1876, the Municipality of the Village of Notre-Dame-de-Grâce was established through proclamation. In 1906, the village of Notre-Dame-de-Grâce was incorporated as a town. On June 4, 1910, Notre-Dame-de-Grâce was annexed to the city of Montreal.

It was during this period that the long-established Descarries family reached its peak. Daniel-Jérémie Décarie (1836-1904) was mayor of Notre-Dame-de-Grâce from 1877 to 1904 and his son, lawyer Jérémie-Louis Décarie (1870-1927), was a Quebec parliamentarian.

In May 1912, Décarie Boulevard was officially designated, running north–south from Côte-des-Neiges and the Town of Mount Royal in the north to Saint-Henri and Côte-Saint-Paul in the south (a section of the road was already known as Décarie Avenue).

In 1908, the first tramway made its appearance in Notre-Dame-de-Grâce, running around the north side of Mount Royal from Snowdon Station to the intersection of Mount Royal and Parc avenues.

Gradually the village developed around the Church of Notre-Dame-de-Grâce which was the head church of the seven parishes on the western part of the Island of Montreal.

It was around 1920 that Anglophones began settling in NDG, resulting in the construction of numerous schools and churches. The Décarie Expressway opened to motorists in April 1967, in time for Expo 67.

In November 1987, Anthony Griffin, an unarmed 19-year old Black resident of NDG, was killed by SPVM officer Alan Gosset. The incident sparked outrage and a number of large protests. Gosset was found not guilty due to a faulty firearm.

Since 2002, the area has been administratively attached to Côte-des-Neiges as the borough of Côte-des-Neiges–Notre-Dame-de-Grâce.

== Geography ==
Notre-Dame-de-Grâce is bounded on the east by the border with Westmount and Côte-des-Neiges, the south by the Saint-Jacques Escarpment, and the north by Côte-Saint-Luc Road, extending west to the border with Montreal West.

=== Westmount Adjacent area ===
"Westmount Adjacent" is a term applied by realtors to a district along the eastern edge of Notre-Dame-de-Grâce, located in between the city of Westmount to the east, the Décarie Expressway to the west, De Maisonneuve Boulevard to the south, and the lands of Villa Maria private high school to the north. Both of Notre-Dame-de-Grâce's metro stations, Vendôme and Villa-Maria, are located in the area.

The construction of the Décarie Expressway forced the displacement of 285 families and had a major impact on the neighbourhood, severing the easternmost part from the whole and leading to the area being referred to as Westmount Adjacent — a term implying housing costs and lifestyles more on par with Westmount, one of the most affluent communities in North America, rather than NDG which as a whole is more middle income.

== Demographics ==
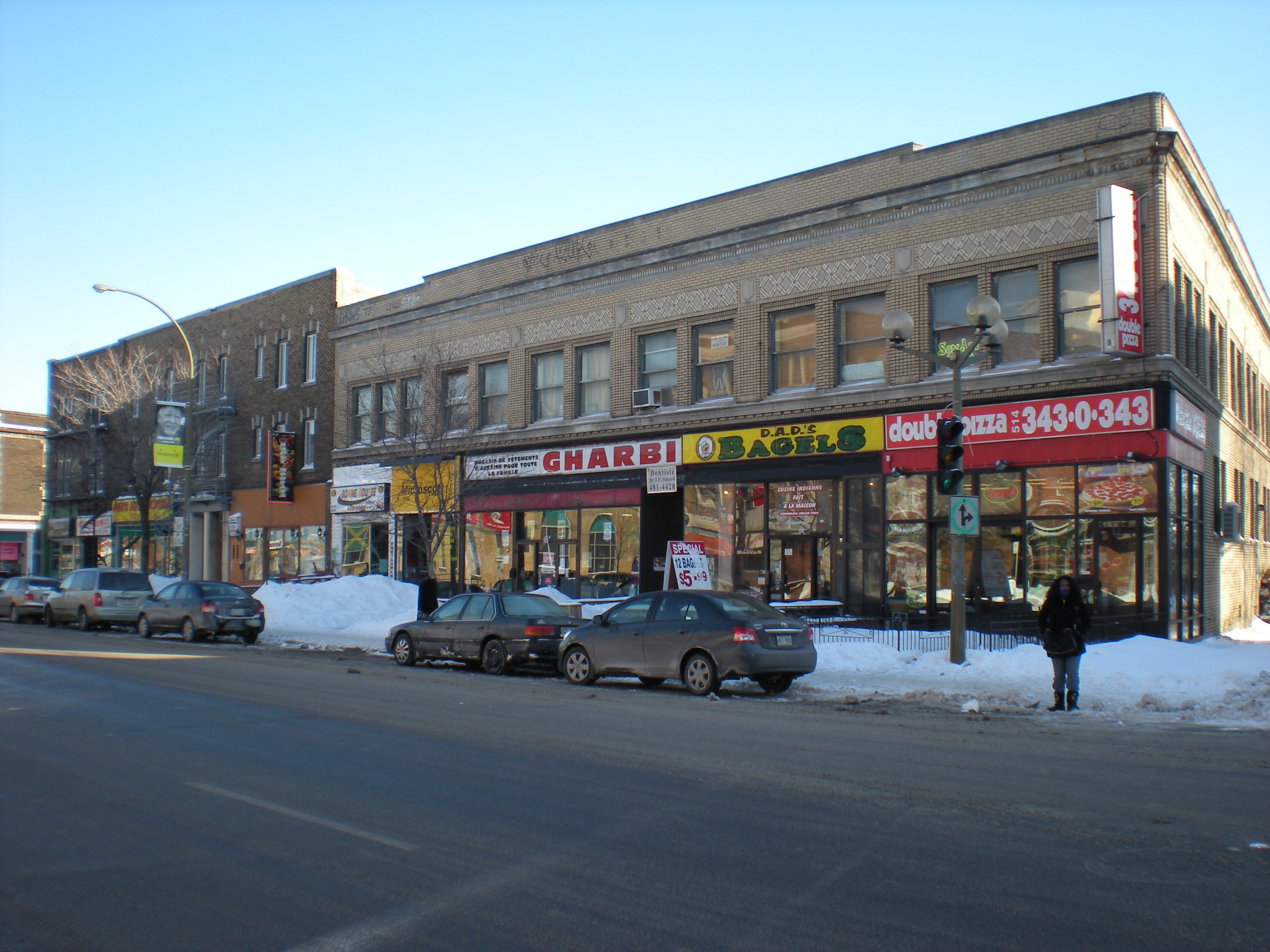
Shops along Sherbrooke Street West in Notre-Dame-de-Grâce.

Broadly speaking Notre-Dame-de-Grâce is a middle class first-ring residential suburb with a culturally and linguistically diverse urban population. The cityscape and history of the community is rooted firmly in NDG's role as a home for an upwardly-mobile French Canadian middle class that developed much of the land roughly between Confederation and the First World War. The neighbourhood is characterized by traditional Montreal housing styles - notably the detached or semidetached duplex - as well as being organized along the historic land division system developed by for agricultural purposes during Quebec's colonial period (i.e. long, rectangular city blocks running perpendicular to a river or ridge). It is a predominantly residential neighbourhood with considerable appeal to a wide variety of Montrealers, owing principally to its local cultural cachet, proximity to the urban core of the city, and wide variety of commercial and public services.

NDG is a community of communities, as there are several somewhat distinct neighbourhoods within it. Officially the community is divided into an eastern and western ward with Cavendish Boulevard serving as the bisecting line. The eastern part of Notre-Dame-de-Grâce is itself split in two parts by the Décarie Expressway (running north–south), which was built in the late 1950s and resulted in the destruction of many hundreds of homes. The eastern ward is focused around the parish church at the intersection of Décarie and Notre-Dame-de-Grâce avenue, with many of the neighbourhood's oldest buildings being found nearby. Owing to its history, the eastern ward is primarily francophone, middle class and has a strong French and Quebecois cultural and aesthetic character.

The western ward developed during the interwar and post-WW2 era and is more varied in terms of housing styles, income levels, cultural representation and spoken languages. Generally speaking NDG is associated with Montreal's multi-ethnic middle-class anglophone community, given the presence of major anglophone institutions like Loyola College of Concordia University and the MUHC super-hospital, but despite this association many residents are bilingual in French and English and speak both on a regular, if not daily, basis.

Affordable housing and proximity to major anglophone post-secondary educational institutions, particularly Dawson College and Concordia University, has resulted in a large and consistent student population residing in NDG.

The visible minority population of the neighbourhood is 33%, with the ethnic breakdown of the neighbourhood varied over the territory of NDG.

There is also a sizeable Afro-Canadian and immigrant community, concentrated mostly around the parts of the district north of Somerled Avenue as well as south of Sherbrooke Street, and a 'Little Italy' located south of the Canadian Pacific line, colloquially referred to as Saint Raymond. The area south of the Canadian Pacific Line, including Saint Raymond and Westhaven Elmhurst, with a population of 5915, has a black population of 19% and a Chinese population of 12%, both notably higher than Montreal as a whole. In recent years, Notre-Dame-de-Grâce has developed into a highly desirable neighbourhood for young professionals, though little gentrification has occurred outside of the Monkland Village.

== Cityscape ==
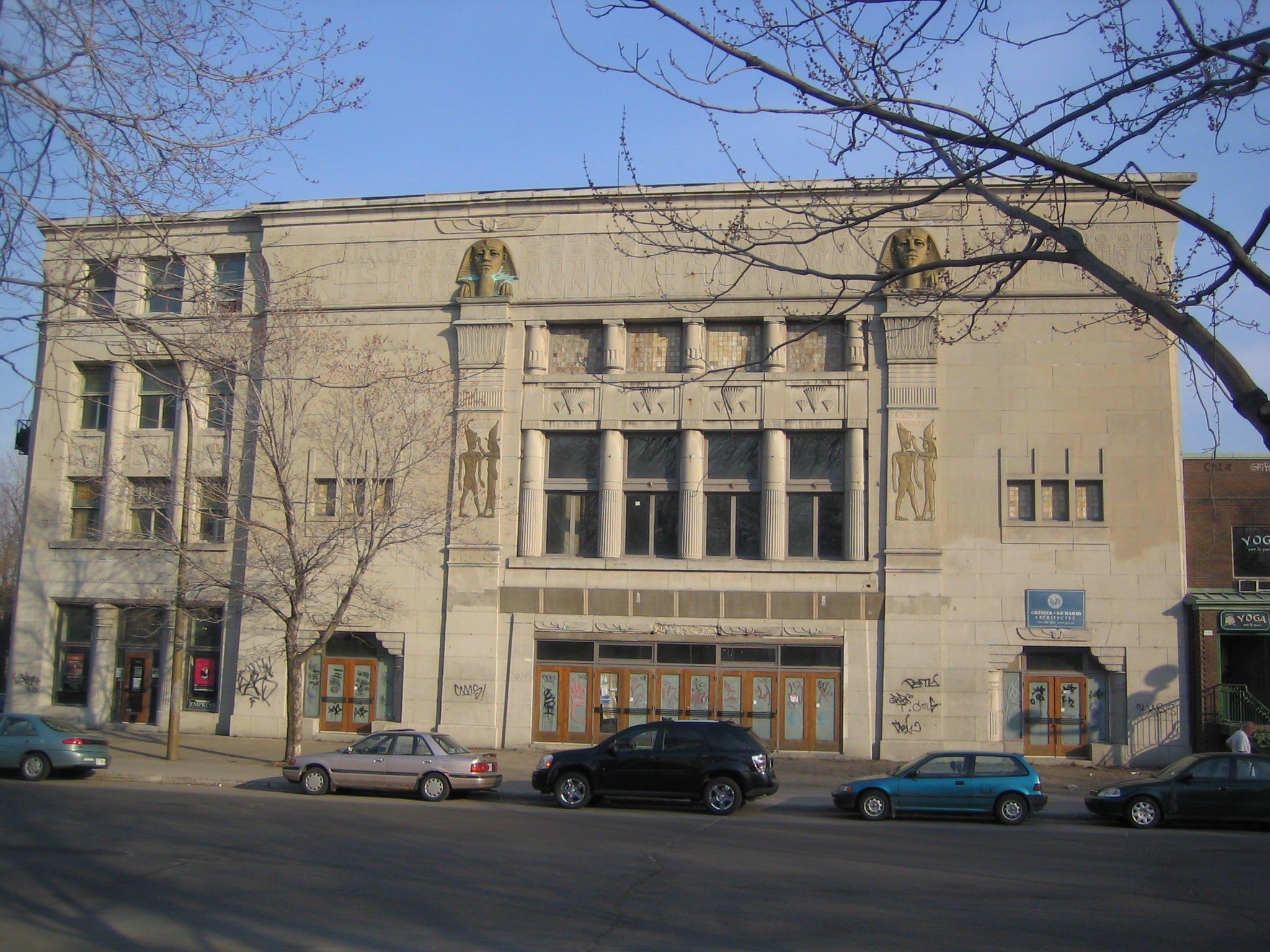
The Empress Theatre located along Sherbrooke Street West.

Geographically NDG is situated on a long plateau extending southwest from Mount Royal, cascading in wide terraces down from Côte-Saint-Luc Road (côte being the French word for ridge) towards the far steeper Saint-Jacques Escarpment. The land is divided, as is traditional in Quebec, in long narrow strips, an evolution of the seigneurial land division system of the province's colonial era. Thus, NDG has many avenues running north–south, but far fewer running east–west. As such, the community is characterized by several prominent boulevards where commercial activity is concentrated. This design element also traces its history back to the earliest urban design planning native to Canada.

NDG is almost exclusively residential and institutional in nature, defined in part by major Anglophone civic institutions anchoring its eastern and western ends. These are the MUHC hospital at the Glen Yards, adjacent to the Vendôme intermodal station and the Loyola campus of Concordia University (situated next to the Montreal-West commuter rail station, respectively). Public schools, libraries, places of worship, parks, playgrounds, and public athletic facilities, including a local chapter of the Montreal YMCA, are distributed throughout the area. Housing tends towards the antique, with much of the construction occurring between 1910 and 1940 and providing a unique mix of Art Nouveau, Art Deco, and Beaux-Arts influences on traditional Quebecois architectural styles. There a variety of housing styles found in the borough, though the dominant and favoured style remains the red brick duplex row-house. Adding to its residential appeal, the community is well known for its tree-lined streets and general walkability.

An important housing project is situated near the geographical centre of NDG on Cavendish Boulevard, which bisects the borough into its eastern and western halves. The Benny Farm housing project was built to serve the needs of veterans returning from Second World War service, though was later designated as subsidized housing. The housing and surrounding landscaping was rehabilitated in the early 2000s, with new low-cost housing and additional public facilities built, such as the Benny Farm CLSC (a community centre with many social services including a clinic run by the provincial health ministry).

The Décarie Expressway trench and the mainline of the Canadian Pacific railway each forms barriers that arguably disrupt the cohesiveness of the borough. As such, sections of NDG have unique characteristics and be characterized as well-defined neighbourhoods. As an example, the sliver of NDG running between the rail line and the Saint-Jacques Escarpment (from Cavendish Boulevard to the Décarie Expressway) is known as St. Raymond's and has a strong association with Montreal's Italian community. Another section, separated from the rest of NDG by a highway trench and sharing a border with Westmount, is closer to where the village of Notre-Dame-de-Grâce was founded, and as such is occasionally referred to as 'Old NDG'.

NDG first rose to prominence as an important middle-class suburb towards the end of the 19th century, initially populated by the (then) new white-collar workforce of the Canadian metropolis and accessible via tramways running to and from the city centre. As widespread suburbanization developed in the post-WW2 period, NDG became home to successive waves of immigrants, first from Eastern Europe (including a sizeable Jewish population), then from the Caribbean, and more recently from Africa, the Middle East, and Southeast Asia. Concurrently, Anglophone Montrealers consolidated in the West End broadly speaking, with Montreal's Irish and Black communities shifting away from their traditional neighbourhoods (Griffintown and Little Burgundy respectively) and taking a more prominent position within the demographics of the area.

Today NDG is a cosmopolitan mixed-income urban neighbourhood highly sought after by young professionals. The multitude of services, including parks and other green spaces, schools, clinics, and major institutions, make it an ideal neighbourhood to raise a family close to the centre of the city of Montreal and its Central Business District. The vintage and antique housing is generally well kept and the aesthetic of the early 20th-century first-ring suburb has been preserved. Additionally, NDG is well-served by public transit, including numerous bus lines, two Métro stations, and two commuter train stations, allowing the area to be one of the most 'walkable' in the entire city.

== Sports and recreation ==
NDG is well known for many large parks including NDG Park (known as Girouard Park), Loyola Park, Trenholme Park, Benny Park, Somerled Park, and Parc de la Confédération. The area has three indoor hockey arenas: the public Doug Harvey Arena (formerly Confederation Arena) and the private Lower Canada College High School and Concordia University (Ed Meagher Arena) rinks. NDG is also home to the NDG YMCA, which includes a pool, gym, and recreation programs for youth and adults.

The community is home to several sports organizations for both children and adults, with NDG Hockey and NDG Baseball being the most well-known and respected organizations. NDG Baseball joined Baseball Québec in 2022 after many years and several championships as part of Little League Quebec.

NDG is home to the Montreal Exiles Rugby Football club (www.montrealexiles.com) who have mini-rugby teams (NDG Dragons) at U-6, U-8, U-10 U-12 and U-14 levels, Junior rugby at U-18 and senior men's rugby. Founded in 2011, the senior men's side featured in the provincial finals in 2011, losing to Westmount in the semi-final, and again in 2012 winning the Division C league and Cup. Their home field is Confederation Park.

== Transportation ==
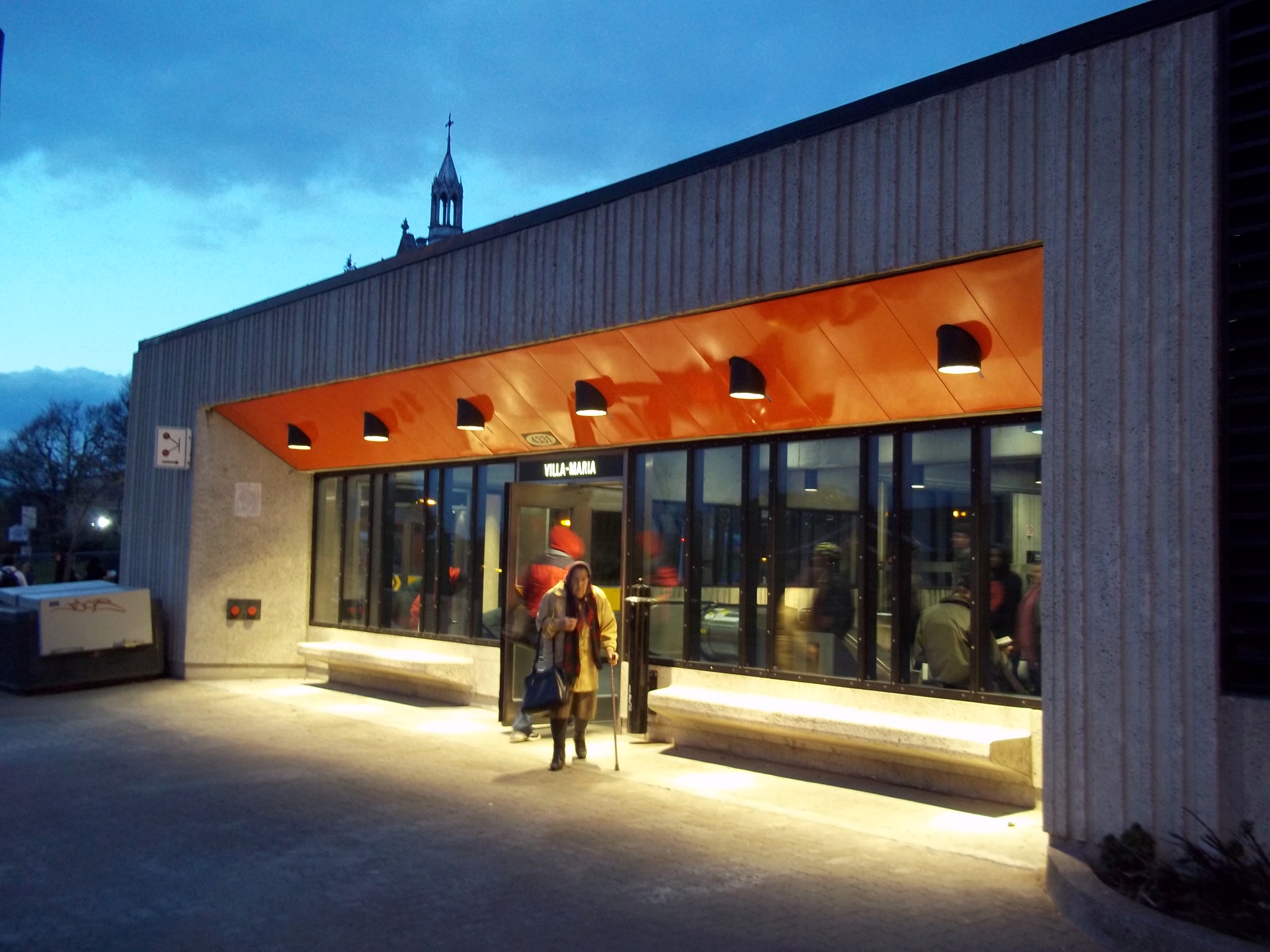
Villa-Maria Montreal Metro station.

The public transport agency that operates transit bus and rapid transit services in Montreal is the Société de transport de Montréal (STM).

=== Rapid transit ===
The Orange Line of Montreal's Metro runs through the borough, following the Décarie Expressway with Villa Maria and Vendôme located on the eastern side of the autoroute trench.

NDG is also served by a variety of STM bus lines offering various service levels:

10-minute maximum (6:00-21:00)

- 24 Sherbrooke: East-West local bus serving Décarie Boulevard in NDG, Villa Maria metro station is its western terminus.
- 51 Édouard-Montpetit: East-West local bus serving Fielding Avenue. Montreal-Ouest commuter rail station is its western terminus.
- 105 Sherbrooke: East-West local bus serving Sherbrooke street in NDG. Montreal-Ouest commuter rail station and Vendôme metro station are its western and eastern termini, respectively.

10-minute maximum (6:00-14:00 East)(14:00-21:00 West)

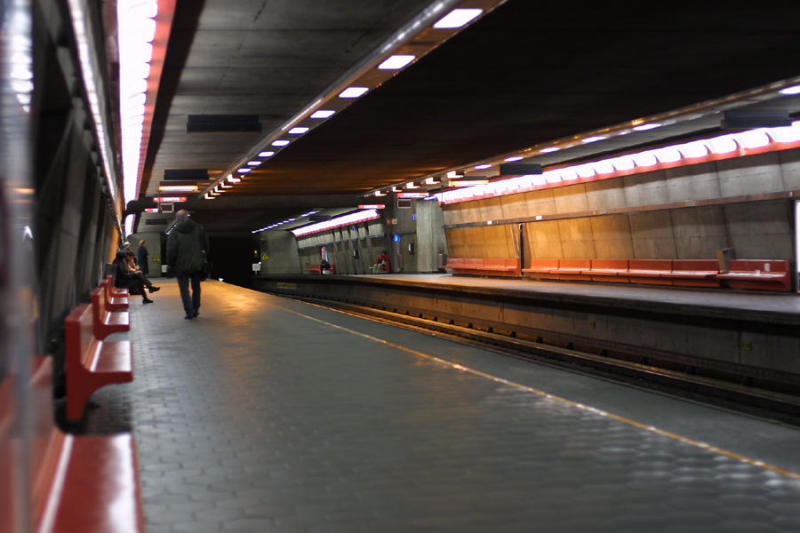
Tracks and platforms at the Vendome metro station.

- 90 Saint-Jacques: East-west local bus serving Saint-Jacques Boulevard in NDG. Connections with Vendôme metro station.
- 103 Monkland: East-West local bus serving Monkland, Grand Boulevard in NDG. Villa Maria metro station serves as its eastern terminus.

Local (day)

- 17 Décarie: North-South local bus serving Girouard Boulevard in NDG. Connections with Vendôme metro station.
- 63 Girouard: North-South local bus serving Girouard Boulevard in NDG.
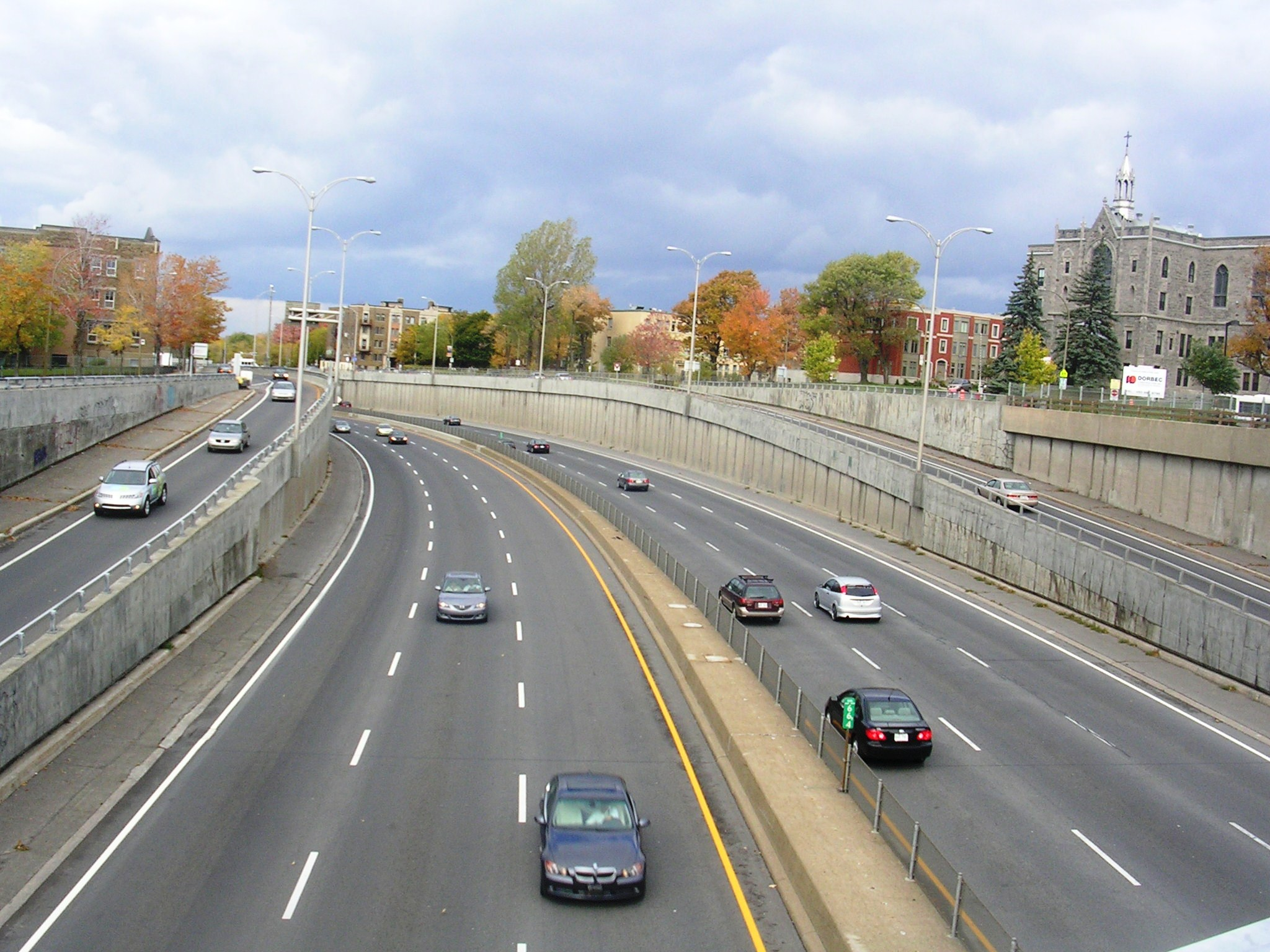
  Autoroute 15 looking north from Monkland avenue in Notre-Dame-de-Grâce.
- 102 Somerled: East-West local bus serving Somerled Avenue in NDG. Its eastern terminus is Vendôme metro station.
- 104 Cavendish: East-West local bus serving Cavendish Boulevard in NDG. Connections with Vendôme metro station.
- 138 Notre-Dame-de-Grâce: East-West local bus serving Notre-Dame-de-Grâce and Cavendish in NDG.
- 162 Westminster: East-West local bus serving Monkland Avenue in NDG. Its eastern terminus is Villa Maria metro station.

Express (day)

- 420 Notre-Dame-De-Grâce Express: Commuter express bus that stops along Cavendish Boulevard and Sherbrooke before it goes to Downtown Montreal.

All night

- 356: Night bus that serves Sherbrooke street in NDG. Operates from 2:30 a.m. to 5:00 a.m.

=== Streetscape ===
The major commercial streets are Monkland Avenue, Somerled Avenue and Sherbrooke Street West. Monkland Village comprises a cluster of businesses on the eastern part of Monkland Avenue that was revitalized in the 1990s. The Décarie Expressway is a major sunken urban highway that runs north–south and splits eastern NDG into two segments. Several bridges connect both sides of the borough for both vehicles and pedestrians.

== Street names ==
The following is a list of street names in the area and what/who they're named after:

- Bessborough: Vere Ponsonby, 9th Earl of Bessborough, 14th Governor General of Canada
- Borden: Robert Borden, 8th Prime Minister of Canada
- Cavendish: Most likely the British House of Cavendish
- Connaught: Prince Arthur, Duke of Connaught and Strathearn, 10th Governor General of Canada
- Décarie: One or many of several prominent members of the Décarie family; possibly specifically Jérémie-Louis Décarie, who was born in NDG
- Fielding: William Stevens Fielding, 7th Premier of Nova Scotia and federal Minister of Finance, editor Montreal Daily Telegraph
- Girouard: Désiré Girouard, Canadian lawyer, politician, and Puisne Justice of the Supreme Court of Canada
- Hampton & Kensington: Both streets were named after royal residences in England. There was once even a Windsor street nearby, which was originally named after Windsor Palace. This has subsequently been renamed Godfrey.
- Harvard: Given the fact that Harvard Ave. is located one block West of Oxford Ave., it's likely that the two neighbouring streets were named together for the two world famous educational institutions, Harvard and Oxford
- Hingston: William Hales Hingston, a Canadian senator & Mayor of Montreal
- Marcil: Georges Marcil, last mayor of NDG before its annexation into the city of Montreal
- Monkland: James Monk, former Chief Justice of Lower Canada; landowner
- Notre-Dame-de-Grâce: NDG — the community in which the street is situated
- Old Orchard: The orchards that used to make up large parts of modern-day NDG
- Oxford: Harvard: Given the fact that Oxford Ave. is located one block East of Harvard Ave., it's likely that the two neighbouring streets were named together for the two world famous educational institutions, Harvard and Oxford
- Sherbrooke: John Coape Sherbrooke, Governor General of British North America, circa 1816
- Somerled: 12th-century Scottish leader
- Terrebonne: A French seigniory near what is now the city of Terrebonne
- Trenholme: Named after the founder of Elmhurst Dairy, Thomas Anderson Trenholme
- Wilson: Named for former Montreal mayor Charles Wilson

== Education ==
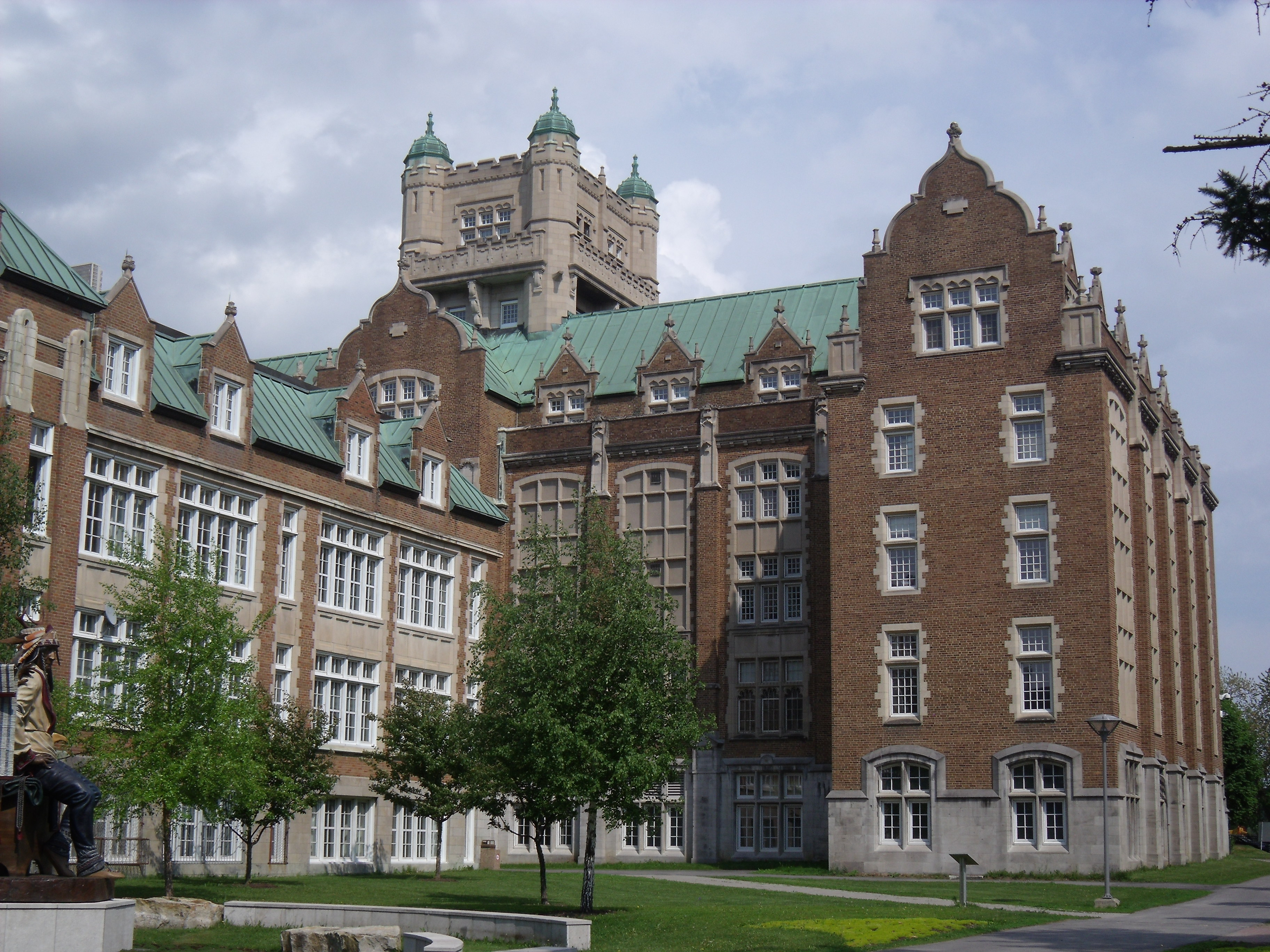
The Administration Building at Concordia University's Loyola campus.

The Centre de services scolaire de Montréal (CSSDM) operates Francophone public schools.

The administrative offices of the English Montreal School Board (ESMB), which operates Anglophone public schools in this borough, are located in Notre-Dame-de-Grâce. The EMSB operates 40 primaries, 17 secondaries and 32 other learning institutions with a total student population of 38,000.

There are numerous private and public educational institutions within the community:

=== Elementary schools ===
French schools (CSSDM)

- École internationale de Montréal (primaire)
- École Marc-Favreau
- L'Étoile Filante
- École Notre-Dame-de-Grâce

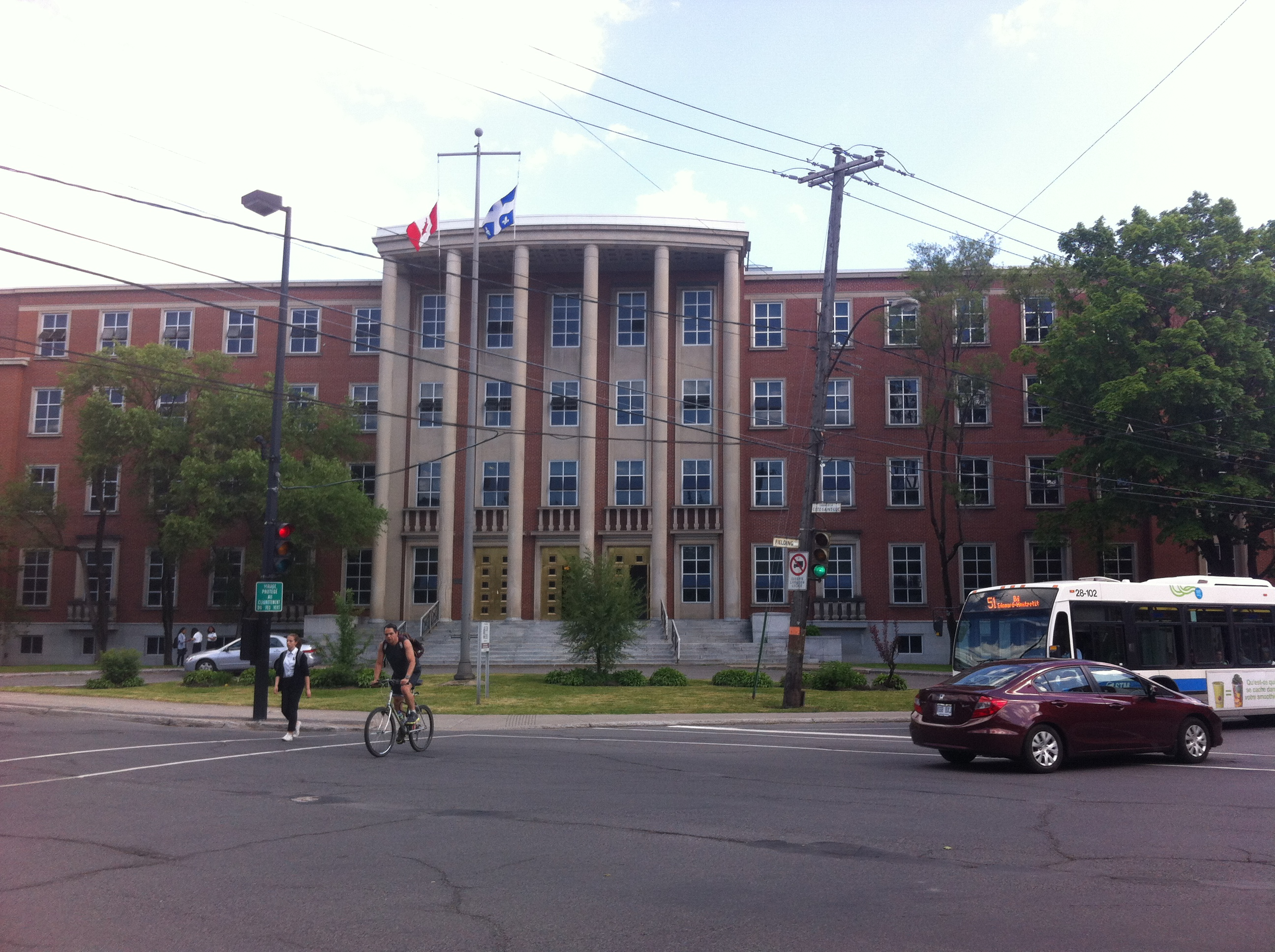
The Administration Building of the English Montreal School Board in NDG.

English Schools

- Royal Vale
- Willingdon School
- Herbert Symonds (Closed 1981)
- St. Monica School

Private Schools

- École Rudolph-Steiner de Montréal

=== High schools ===
Private

- Centennial Academy
- Greaves Adventist Academy
- Lower Canada College
- Loyola High School
- Villa Maria
- Kells Academy

Public

- Marymount Academy
- Royal Vale School (K-11)
- West Hill High School (Montreal)(closed 1992)
- École Saint-Luc

=== Universities ===
- Concordia University (Loyola Campus)

=== Public libraries ===
The Montreal Public Libraries Network operates libraries.

== Notable residents ==
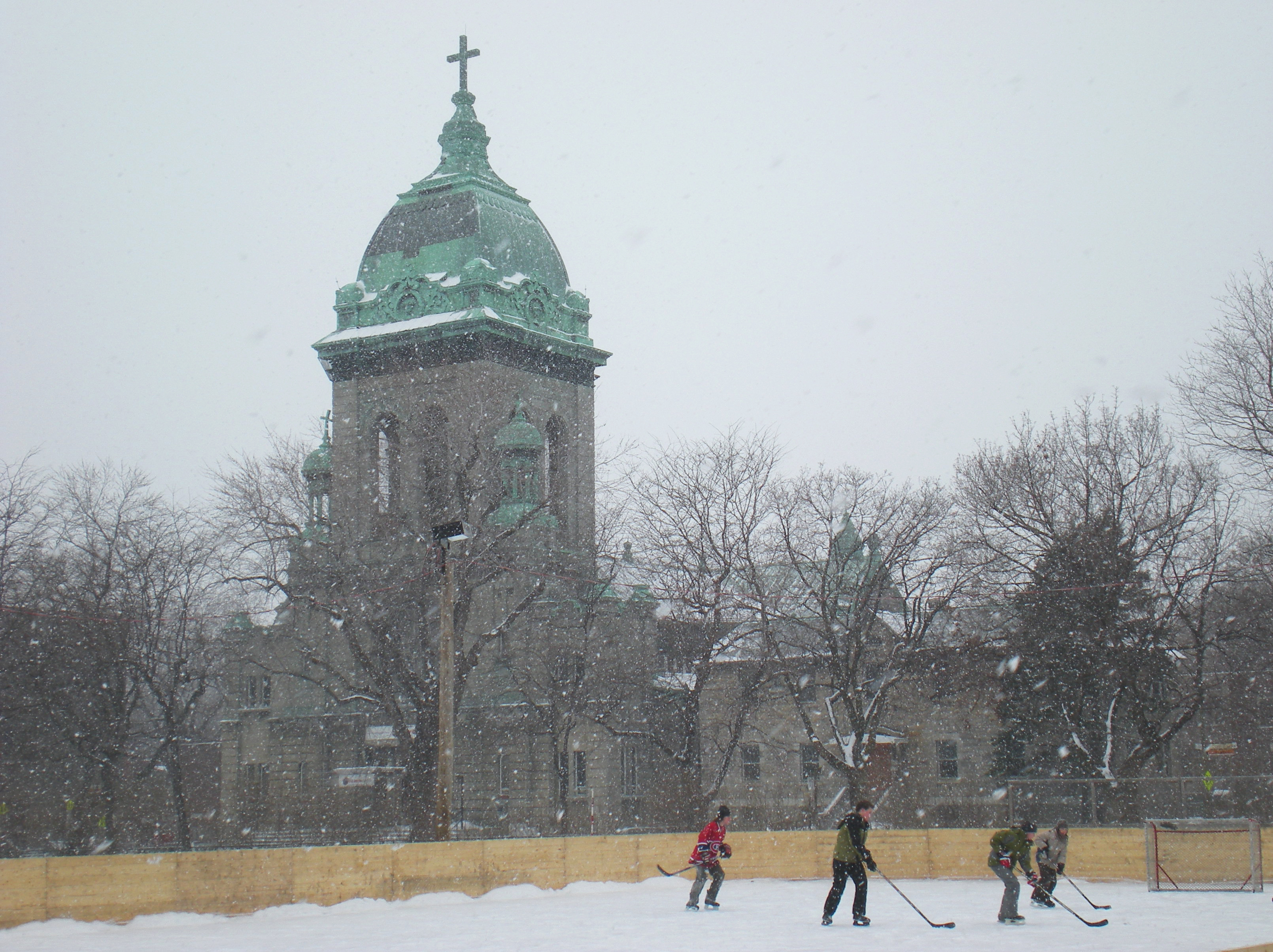
An outdoor ice hockey rink located at Notre-Dame-de-Grâce Park. L’Église Sainte-Augustine de Canterbury, now known as River's Edge Community Church, is in the background.

=== Actors, musicians, artists ===
- Hubert Aquin, novelist, essayist, filmmaker, editor
- Jay Baruchel, actor
- Constance Beresford-Howe, writer
- Albéric Bourgeois, cartoonist
- Michel de Broin, sculptor
- Anne Dorval, actress
- Paterson Ewen, painter
- Charles Gagnon, painter, photographer, filmmaker
- Ida Haendel, violinist
- Corky Laing, drummer
- Irving Layton, poet
- Laurence Leboeuf, actress
- Guido Molinari, artist
- Émile Ollivier (writer), writer
- Jessica Paré, actress
- Michel Rivard, French Canadian singer
- Sam Roberts (singer-songwriter), singer-songwriter
- William Shatner, actor
- Alan B. Stone, photographer
- Françoise Sullivan, dancer, sculptor, photographer, painter
- Daisy Sweeney, pianist
- Yves Thériault, writer

=== Athletes and sports officials/personalities ===
- Mauro Biello, former professional soccer player
- Steven Fletcher (ice hockey), NHL player
- Frank Greenleaf, president of the Canadian and Quebec Amateur Hockey Associations
- Doug Harvey, former NHL player
- Eddie Johnston, former NHL player
- Ismaël Koné, professional soccer player
- Fleming Mackell, former NHL player
- Russell Martin, major league baseball catcher
- Jim McKean, former CFL player and MLB umpire
- Ian Mofford, former CFL player and Grey Cup champion
- Sergio Momesso, former NHL player and current sports commentator
- Gabriel Morency, sports-talk radio personality
- Howie Morenz, former NHL player
- Ken Mosdell, former NHL player
- Sam Pollock, General Manager; Montreal Canadiens
- Marco Scandella, NHL player

=== Politicians ===
- Warren Allmand, Member of Parliament 1965-1997
- Monique Bégin, Member of Parliament 1972-1984
- Charles Duquette, Mayor of Montreal 1924-1926
- Michael Fainstat, City Councillor/ Chairman of the Executive Committee of Montreal
- Sarto Fournier, Mayor of Montreal 1957-1960, Member of Parliament, Senator
- Daniel Johnson Sr., Premier of Quebec 1966-1968
- Charles Marcil, Member of Parliament 1900-1937

== See also ==
- List of former towns in Quebec
- Oxford Park, Montreal
