= Queen-Mary Road =

Road in Montreal and Hampstead, Canada

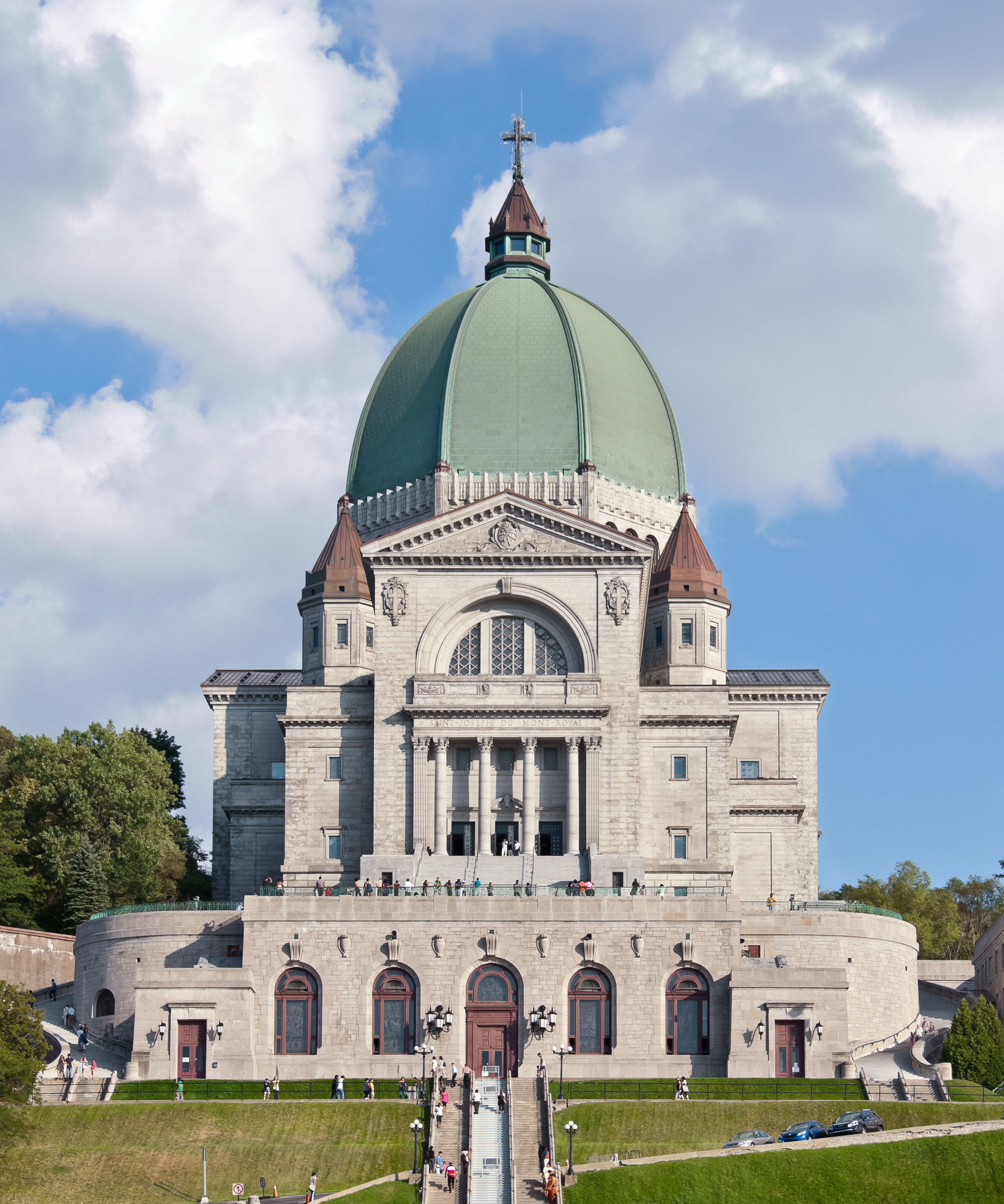
- Saint Joseph's Oratory is located on Queen-Mary Road.
- Interactive map of Queen-Mary Road
- Native name: chemin Queen-Mary (French)
- Owner: Cities of Hampstead and Montreal
- Location: Hampstead and Montreal
- Coordinates: 45°29′23″N 73°37′31″W
- West end: Rue Holly, Hampstead
- Major junctions: A-15 Décarie Expressway; Chemin de la Côte des Neiges
- East end: Avenue Decelles, Côte-des-Neiges

Queen-Mary Road (officially in French: chemin Queen-Mary) is an east-west road located in Montreal, Quebec, Canada.

Queen-Mary Road crosses the borough of Côte-des-Neiges-Notre-Dame-de-Grace and the town of Hampstead and is located on the northwest flank of Mount Royal. The road was named in 1910 in honour of Mary of Teck, who became Queen consort on May 6, 1910, when her husband George V became King of the United Kingdom.

== History ==
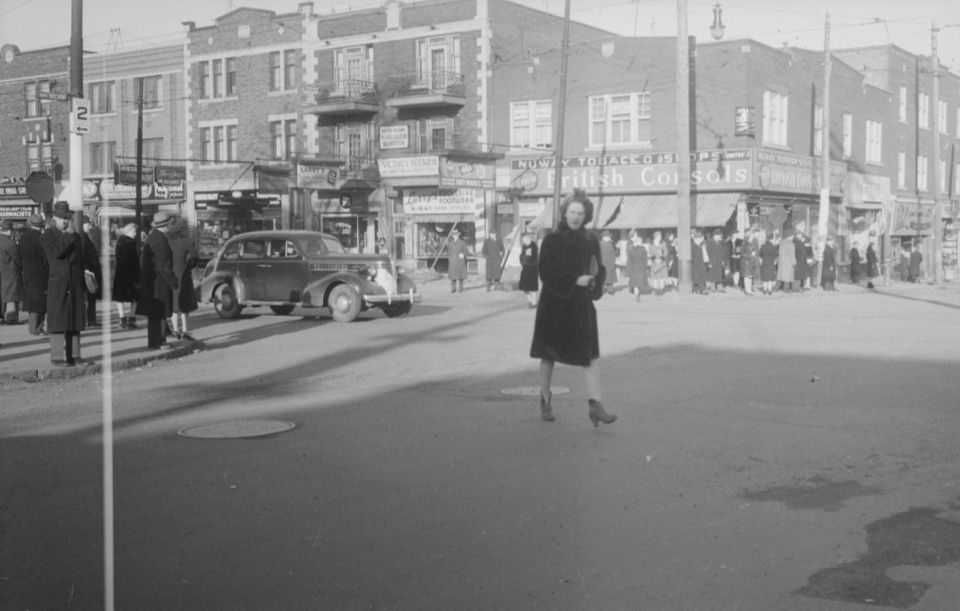
Queen-Mary Road near Decarie Boulevard in 1943

In 1900, urban residents could still enjoy the rural northern flank of Mount Royal by taking the path of the Côte-des-Neiges Road and then Côte-Saint-Luc Road.

The urbanization of the territory started in 1925 with the connection of different tram lines. The development of public transportation encouraged the construction of numerous tenements along major thoroughfares such as Queen-Mary Road, which was then the Snowdon Junction terminus.

In the 1960s, the Decarie Expressway trench was dug, splitting the road in two, which increased vehicular traffic in the Snowdon neighbourhood.

In 1981, the Snowdon metro station opened near the site of the old tram terminus. This station is an important transit crossroad because it serves two Metro lines, the Orange Line and the Blue Line, in addition to many buses. Today, Queen-Mary Road is still a main focus of the neighbourhood.

== Proposed name change ==
In fall 2010, in the wake of the canonization of Brother André, some politicians and journalists suggested that Queen-Mary Road be renamed Frère-André Road.

== See also ==
- 166 Queen-Mary
- Royal eponyms in Canada
