= Benny Farm =

Benny Farm Aire Benny
- Neighbourhood
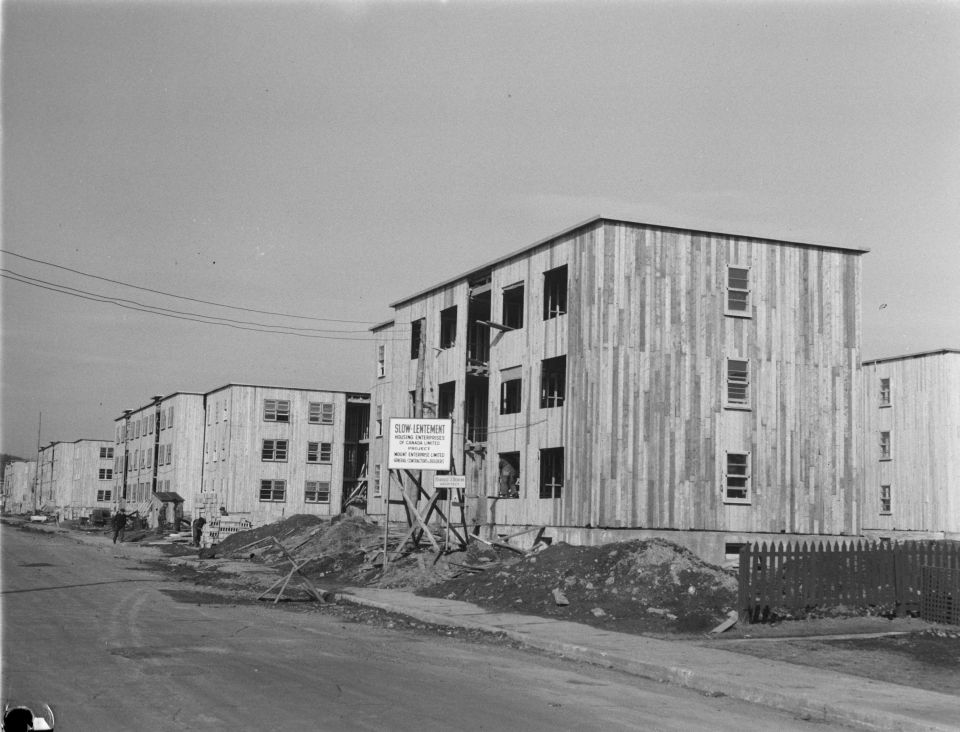
- Houses of Benny Farm under construction in 1947

- Location of Benny Farm in Montreal
- Coordinates: 45.464563°N 73.630813°W
- Country: Canada
- Province: Quebec
- City: Montreal
- Borough: Côte-des-Neiges–Notre-Dame-de-Grâce
- Postal Code: H4B
- Area codes: 514, 438

Benny Farm is a residential development in the Notre-Dame-de-Grâce district of Montreal, originally developed in the late 1940s by the Government of Canada for returning veterans of the Second World War and their families. In 2010, the area was official renamed as Aire Benny by the borough of Côte-des-Neiges–Notre-Dame-de-Grâce.

These initial apartment buildings units were maintained by the Department of Veterans Affairs, then later by the Canada Mortgage and Housing Corporation (CMHC).

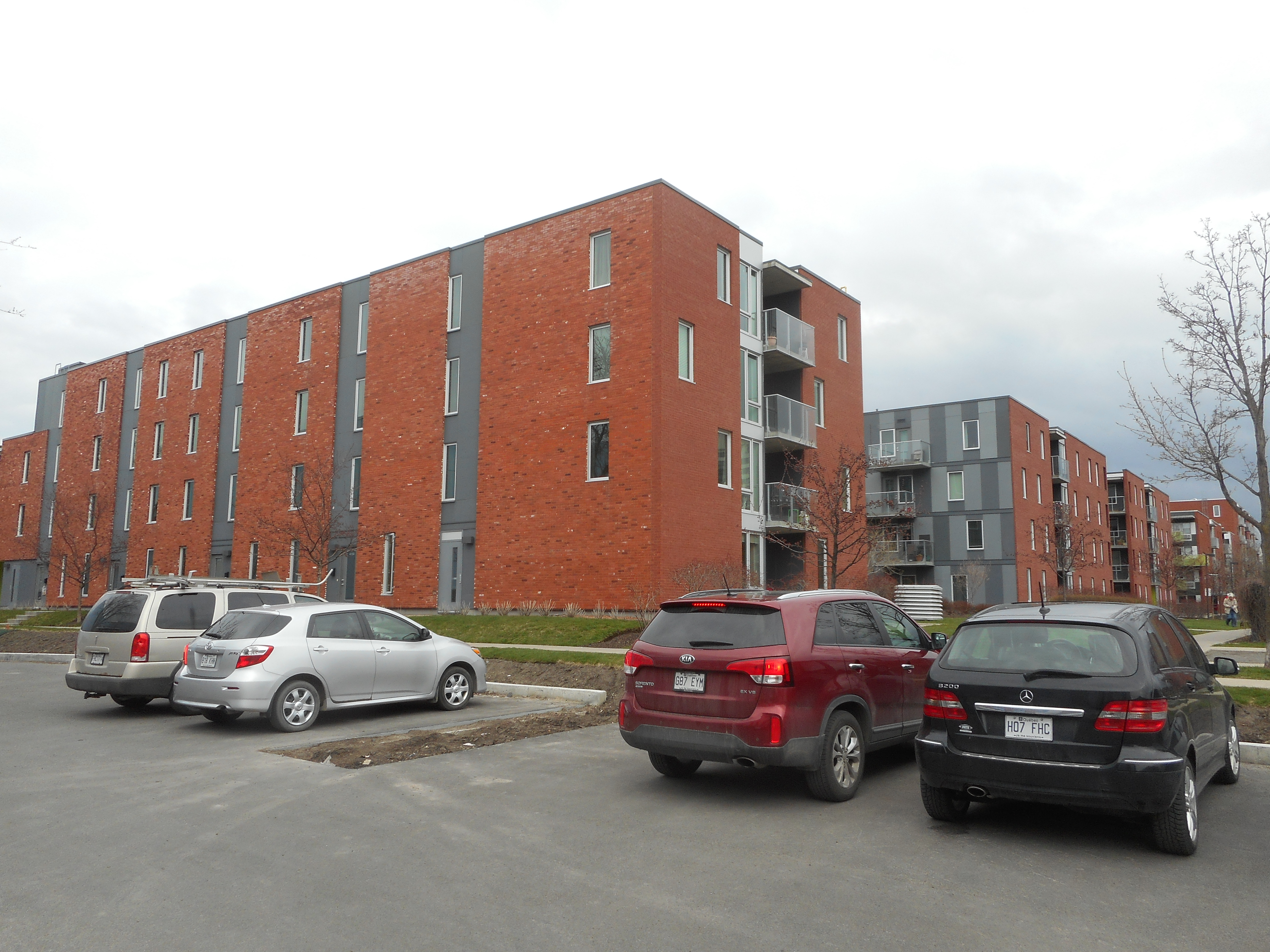
Benny Farm in 2016

In 1997, the Canada Lands Company and CMHC added four new apartment buildings to provide modern and accessible homes for veterans, their families and new tenants who had previously lived in original Benny Farm units. These additions were part of CLC's larger redevelopment project for the Benny Farm property, which added approximately 570 new and refurbished housing units and two new community service buildings. In 2002, the architectural firms of Saia and Barbarese and Laverdière + Giguère received the Governor General's Medal for Architecture for their work in developing the buildings and landscaping.

In 2007, the CLC sold these properties to the Office municipal d'habitation de Montréal.
