= West Hill High School =

Defunct high school in Montreal, Canada

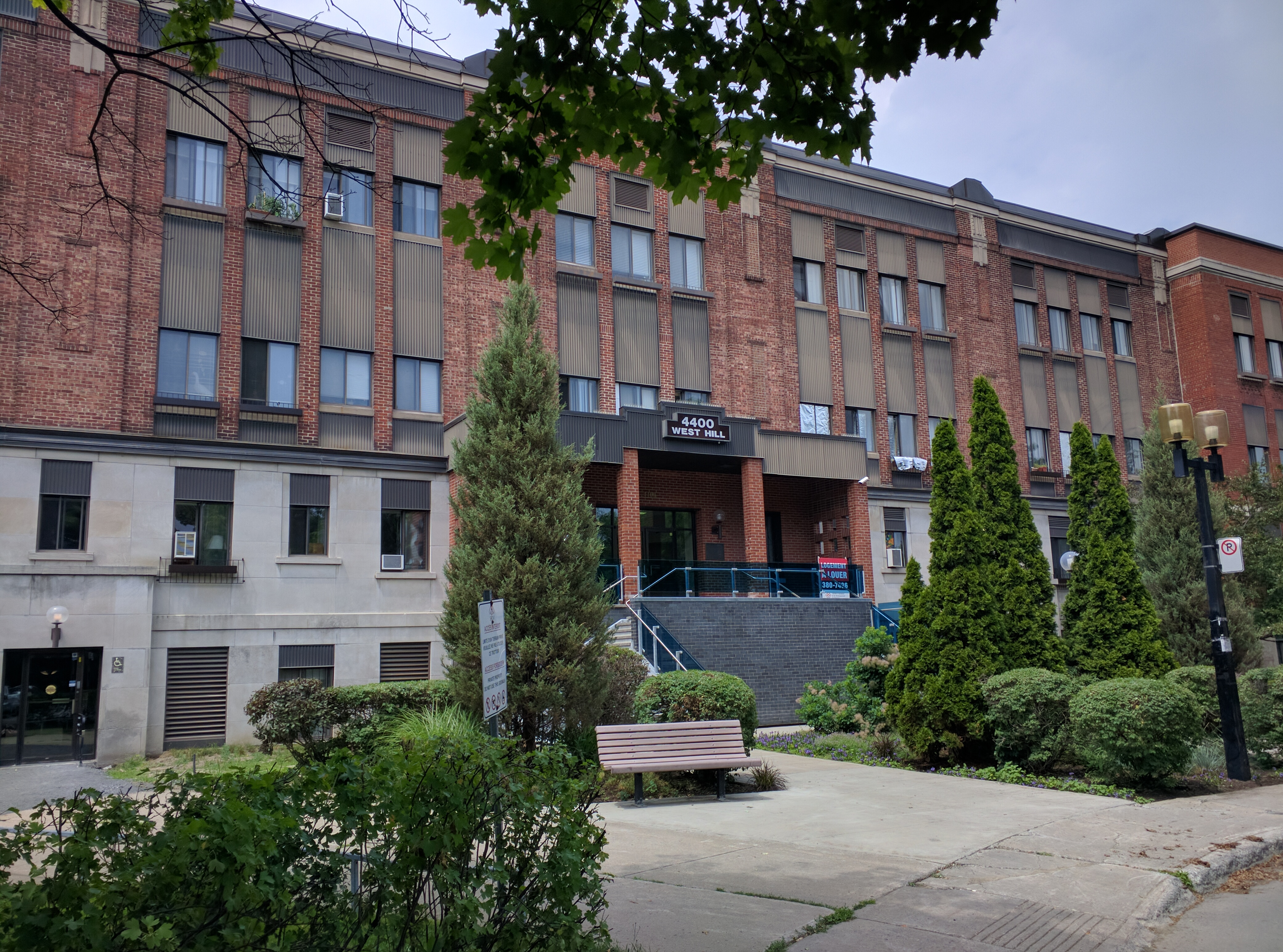
Seniors' residence at 4400 West Hill, Montreal, formerly West Hill and Monklands High School (July 2016)

West Hill High School was the name of two former schools in the neighbourhood of Notre-Dame-de-Grâce (NDG) in Montreal, Quebec, Canada.

The first West Hill High School was opened in 1919 by the Coteau St. Pierre School Commission on West Hill Avenue. It was annexed by the Protestant Board of School Commissioners (PBSC) in 1921. As NDG's population increased, the school was expanded in 1926 and 1931, and plans were announced for building a new high school in NDG.

Construction of the new school was delayed by the Great Depression, World War II, and then the amalgamation of the PBSC into the Protestant School Board of Greater Montreal in 1946. Work began on the school in 1950 at the corner of Somerled and Draper avenues (address 5851 Somerled) and was completed in 1952. The name of the school was announced as Somerled High School in 1943 but changed to Monklands High School when work was begun. However, just before opening, its name was changed to West Hill High School.

The original West Hill High School was renamed to Westward School and became a junior high school, for grade 7 and 8 students only. In 1954, Westward School went back to being a full high school to handle the impact of the baby boom. In 1955, the school changed its name yet again, this time to Monklands High School, the previous name of the new West Hill High School on Somerled Avenue while it was under construction.

In 1979, the original West Hill High School, known then as Monklands High School, was closed due to a dramatic decline in enrollment. In 1984, the building was renovated into a seniors residence by the City of Montreal.

The second West Hill High School is now Royal Vale School, part of the English Montreal School Board.

== Notable alumni ==
- Sidney Altman, scientist
- Doug Harvey, professional hockey player
- William Shatner, Canadian actor
- Peter Silverman, Canadian Journalist
- Mutsumi Takahashi
- John Taylor, Canadian football player
- Arthur Lipsett, Canadian Filmmaker
- Daniel Louis, Oscar winning Canadian Film Producer
- Abbey Silverstone, Founder Silicon Graphics Computer Systems (SGI)
