= Kells Academy =

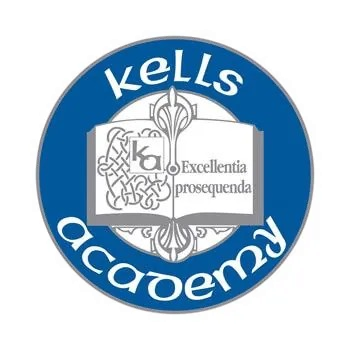

Location
- High School - 6865 De Maisonneuve West, corner Park Row West Middle School 6465 De Maisonneuve West, corner of Walkley Elementary 2290 Cavendish corner De Maisonneuve West; Montreal, Quebec, H4B 1T1; Canada; 45°27′34″N 73°37′52″W

Information
- School type: Private high school
- Motto: "We Open Minds", "Experience Excellence Extraordinary"
- Founded: 1978
- Principal: Mr. Tom Malone (high school) and Ms Marla Perlman (elementary)
- Head of school: Mrs. Linda Leiberman
- Grades: K-12
- Language: English
- Campus: Urban
- Colors: Blue, White and Gray
- Public transit access: Bus routes 105, 162
- Website: www.kells.ca

Kells Academy is an English-language academic high school, middle school and elementary school in Montreal, Quebec. The campuses are all located on De Maisonneuve West in Côte-des-Neiges-Notre-Dame-de-Grâce, Montréal, Québec. The school offers coed programs for kindergarten to grade 12.

Founded in 1978 by Irene Woods, the school is currently headed by Linda Leiberman.

== History ==
Kells Academy was established in 1978 as the Westmount Learning Center by Ms. Irene Woods. It was founded as a practical application of tutoring in the classroom. The school began seeing larger enrollment numbers which ultimately led them to acquire its own building on De Maisonneuve West and Park Row West in CDN-NDG as of 1990. They also expanded with the acquisition of the Hydro-Québec building in 2004 that was situated on Cavendish Boulevard at the corner of De Maisonneuve, where the elementary school soon relocated.

Enrollment grew as the number of foreign students increased, notably coming from Ukraine, China, Vietnam, Syria, and Turkey.

When the property beside the elementary school became available, Kells purchased it and rebuilt it to act as a middle school campus, opening in 2017. That same year, the school rented a Westmount space to become the new language center.

The school is also one of the first Canadian schools to quickly adopt iPads as part of their learning environment in 2010.

== Facilities ==
Kells Academy has three buildings. The highschool is at 6865 De Maisonneuve (H4B 1T1). It has a cafeteria, library, music and art rooms, an IT/Resource center, and a science laboratory. Next to the building in Trenholme Park is a gymnasium, an outdoor soccer field, a baseball diamond, and a winter skating rink that is used by the highschool.

The middle school building is at 6645 De Maisonneuve West (H4B 2Y3). It has a cafeteria, a music room and an art room. Adjacent to the building in Trenholme Park is a gymnasium, an outdoor soccer field, a baseball diamond, and a winter skating rink that is used by the middle school.

The elementary building, at 2290 Cavendish Boulevard (H4B 2Y3), has a library, music and art rooms, a cafeteria, a gymnasium, and an outdoor playground area which features a turf soccer field.

== Admission ==
Kells Academy doesn’t receive subsidies from the provincial government and therefore doesn’t require the certificate of eligibility.
