= Ian Mofford =

Profile
- Position: Wide receiver

Personal information
- Born: August 12, 1954 (age 72); Montreal, Quebec, Canada

Career information
- QJFL: Verdun Maple Leaf

Career history
- 1974–79: Montreal Alouettes
- 1979: Ottawa Rough Riders
- 1980–81: Winnipeg Blue Bombers
- 1981: Montreal Alouettes
- 1982: Montreal Concordes

Awards and highlights
- 2× Grey Cup champion (1974, 1977)

Ian Mofford (born August 12, 1954) is a former Grey Cup champion wide receiver and running back who played nine seasons in the Canadian Football League, winning two Grey Cup Championships.

Mofford, a Notre-Dame-de-Grâce native who played for Monklands High School and the Verdun Maple Leafs, began his CFL career with the Montreal Alouettes, playing 6 seasons and 79 games (up to 1979) and won 2 Grey Cup championships, in 1974 and 1977. He later joined the Ottawa Rough Riders for one season, the Winnipeg Blue Bombers for two seasons, and returned to the Als in 1981, playing 3 games. His last year was 1982, when he played 4 games for the Montreal Concordes.
