= Côte-des-Neiges–Notre-Dame-de-Grâce =

Coordinates: 45.47617°N 73.62705°W

- Borough of Montreal
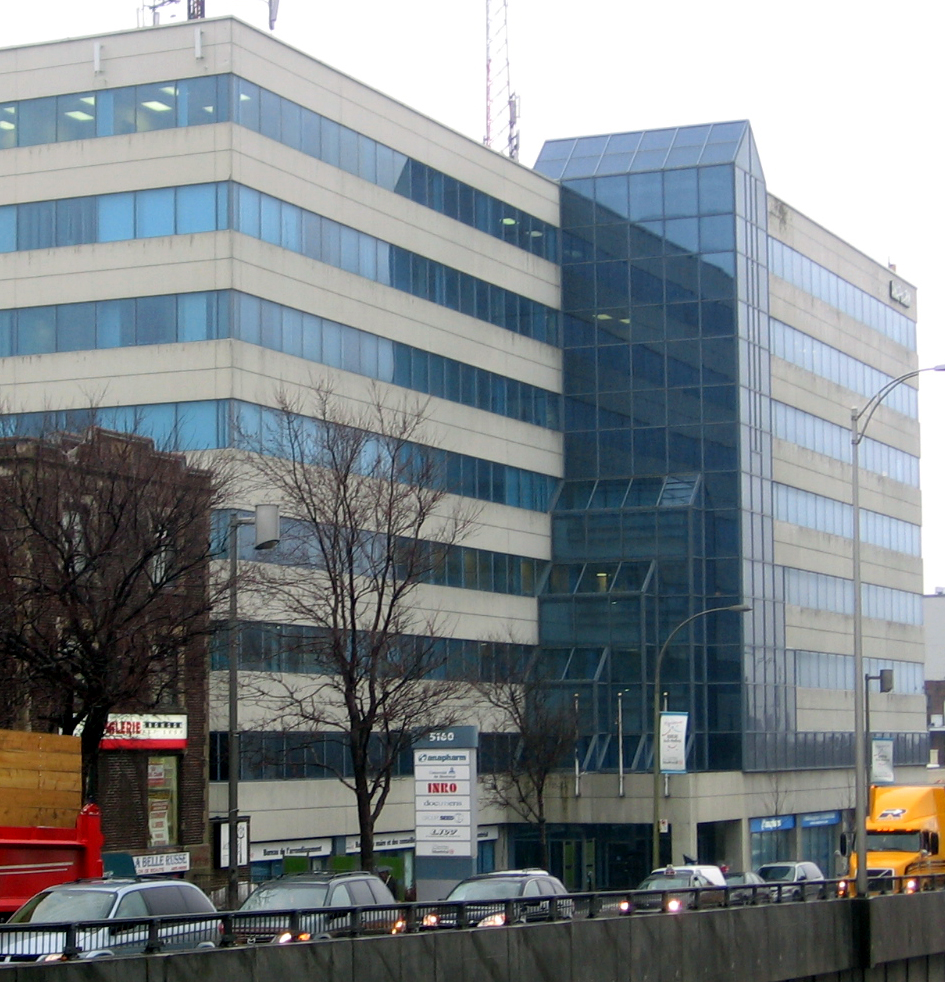
- Borough Hall, adjacent to the Décarie Expressway.

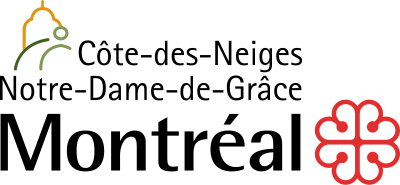

- Location of Côte-des-Neiges–Notre-Dame-de-Grâce on the Island of Montreal. (Grey areas indicate demerged municipalities).
- Country: Canada
- Province: Quebec
- Region: Montreal (06)
- Created: 1 January 2002
- Electoral Districts Federal: Mount Royal; Outremont; Notre-Dame-de-Grâce—Westmount
- Provincial: D'Arcy-McGee; Notre-Dame-de-Grâce; Mont-Royal–Outremont

Government
  - Type: Borough
  - Mayor: Stephanie Valenzuela (EM)
  - Federal MP(s): Anthony Housefather (LIB); Rachel Bendayan (LIB); Anna Gainey (LIB)
  - Quebec MNA(s): Elisabeth Prass (PLQ); Desiree McGraw (PLQ); Michelle Setlakwe (PLQ)

Area
  - Total: 21.4 km^{2} (8.3 sq mi)

Population (2021)
  - Total: 170,583
  - Density: 7,971.2/km^{2} (20,645/sq mi)
  - Dwellings: 74,550
- Time zone: UTC-5 (EST)
  - Summer (DST): UTC-4 (EDT)
- Postal code(s): H4A, H4B, H4X, H3S, H3T, H3V, H3W
- Area codes: (514) and (438)
- Access Routes A-15: R-138
- Website: www.ville.montreal.qc.ca

Côte-des-Neiges–Notre-Dame-de-Grâce (French: [kot de nɛːʒ nɔtʁə dam də ɡʁɑs], locally [koʊ̯t de naɪ̯ʒ nɔtʁ̥œ̈ dam dœ̈ ɡʁɑːs]) is a borough (arrondissement) of Montreal, Quebec, Canada. The borough was created following the 2002 municipal reorganization of Montreal. It comprises two main neighbourhoods, Côte-des-Neiges and Notre-Dame-de-Grâce, both former towns that were annexed by the city of Montreal in 1910.

Côte-des-Neiges–Notre-Dame-de-Grâce is the most populous borough of Montreal, with a population of 170,583 according to the 2021 Census. It is an ethnically diverse borough, and there is also a large student population due to the presence of two universities, Université de Montréal and the Loyola campus of Concordia University.

== History ==
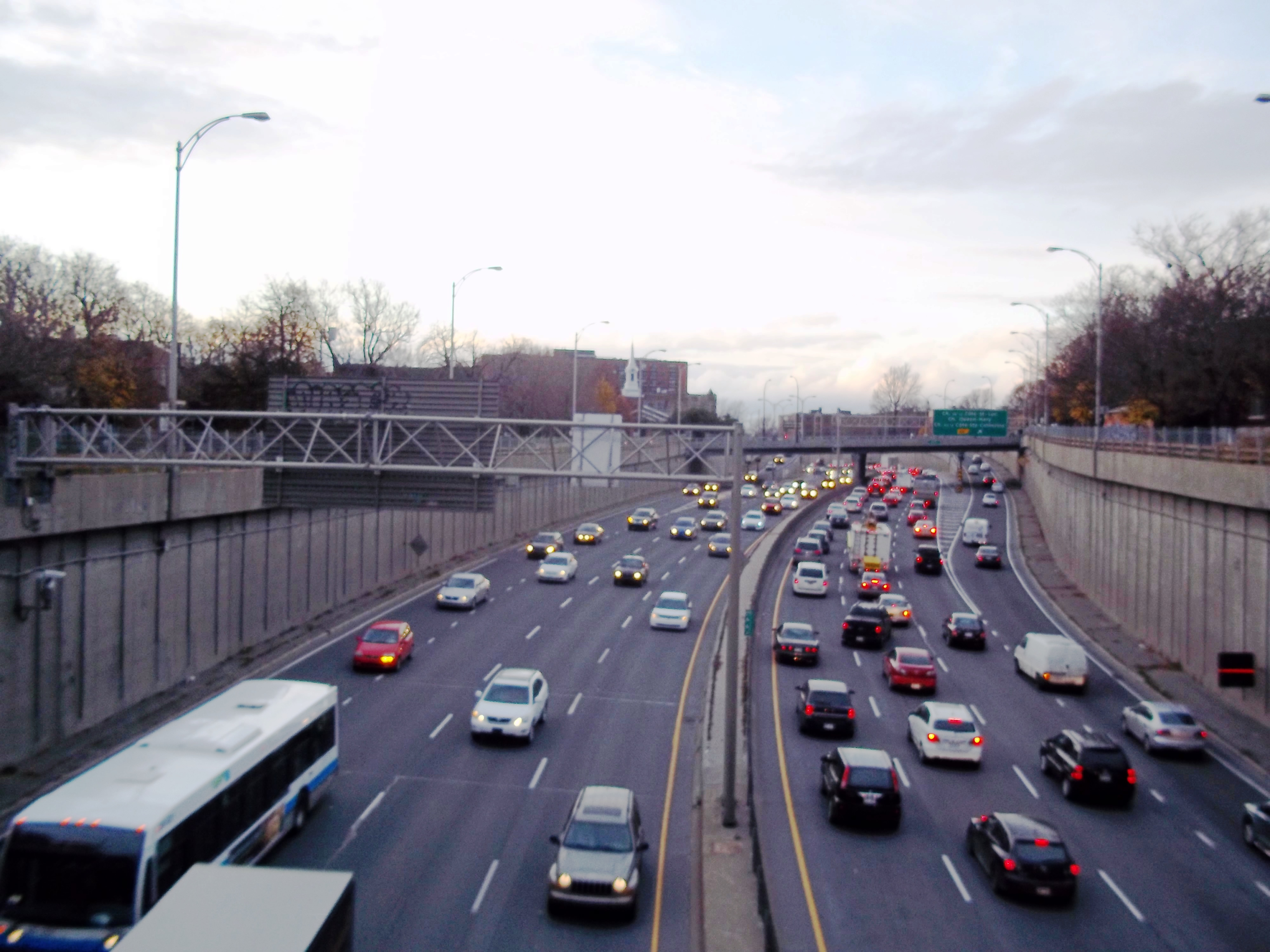
The Décarie Expressway, which cuts through the borough, opened in 1966.

The colonization of the territory of the borough of Côte-des-Neiges–Notre-Dame-de-Grâce, located on the western and northern flanks of Mount Royal, began in the era of New France. In the beginning, Côte-des-Neiges was frequented by vacationing members of the Montreal bourgeoisie. The first inhabitants of the area worked in the tanning industry in the eighteenth and nineteenth centuries. The area urbanized following the arrival of its first public and religious institutions in the late nineteenth century. The establishment of Université de Montréal in Côte-des-Neiges in the 1930s accelerated its growth.

Notre-Dame-de-Grâce was agricultural land prior to the arrival of streetcars in 1908. The inhabitants of the area were predominantly anglophone. The urbanization of this area occurred between the 1910s and the 1930s. The establishment of Loyola College (today Concordia University) contributed to the growth of the area.

Saint Joseph's Oratory opened on Queen Mary Road in Côte-des-Neiges in 1955. It is the most important pilgrimage site dedicated to Saint Joseph in the world. The Décarie Expressway opened to motorists in 1966, in time for Expo 67. The construction of the expressway, which cuts through both Côte-des-Neiges and Notre-Dame-de-Grâce, resulted in the displacement of 285 families from their homes.

== Geography ==
Located to the north and west of Mount Royal, it was part of the City of Montreal prior to the 2002 municipal mergers. It is composed of the districts of Notre-Dame-de-Grâce and Côte-des-Neiges, and also includes the redeveloped neighbourhood Le Triangle.

The irregularly shaped borough is bounded on the north by the town of Mount Royal, on the east by Outremont, on the southeast by Ville-Marie and Westmount, on the south by Le Sud-Ouest, and on the west by Côte Saint-Luc, Hampstead, and Montreal West. The Notre Dame des Neiges Cemetery is in the south east corner of the borough.

It has an area of 21,4 km^{2} (8¼ sq. mi.) and a population of 170,583 making it the most populous of Montreal's boroughs.

== Government ==
=== Municipal ===
Following the November 2nd 2025 Montreal municipal election, the current borough council consists of the following councillors:

District	Position	Name	Party
—	Borough mayor City councillor	Stephanie Valenzuela	Ensemble Montréal
Côte-des-Neiges	City councillor	Emilie Brière	Projet Montréal
Darlington	City councillor	Milany Thiagarajah	Ensemble Montréal
Loyola	City councillor	Alexandre Teodoresco	Ensemble Montréal
Notre-Dame-de-Grâce	City councillor	Peter McQueen	Projet Montréal
Snowdon	City councillor	Sonny Moroz	Ensemble Montréal

=== Federal and provincial ===
The borough is divided among the following federal ridings:

- Mount Royal
- Outremont
- Notre-Dame-de-Grâce—Westmount

It is divided among the following provincial electoral districts:

- D'Arcy-McGee
- Notre-Dame-de-Grâce
- Outremont
- Mont-Royal

== Transport ==
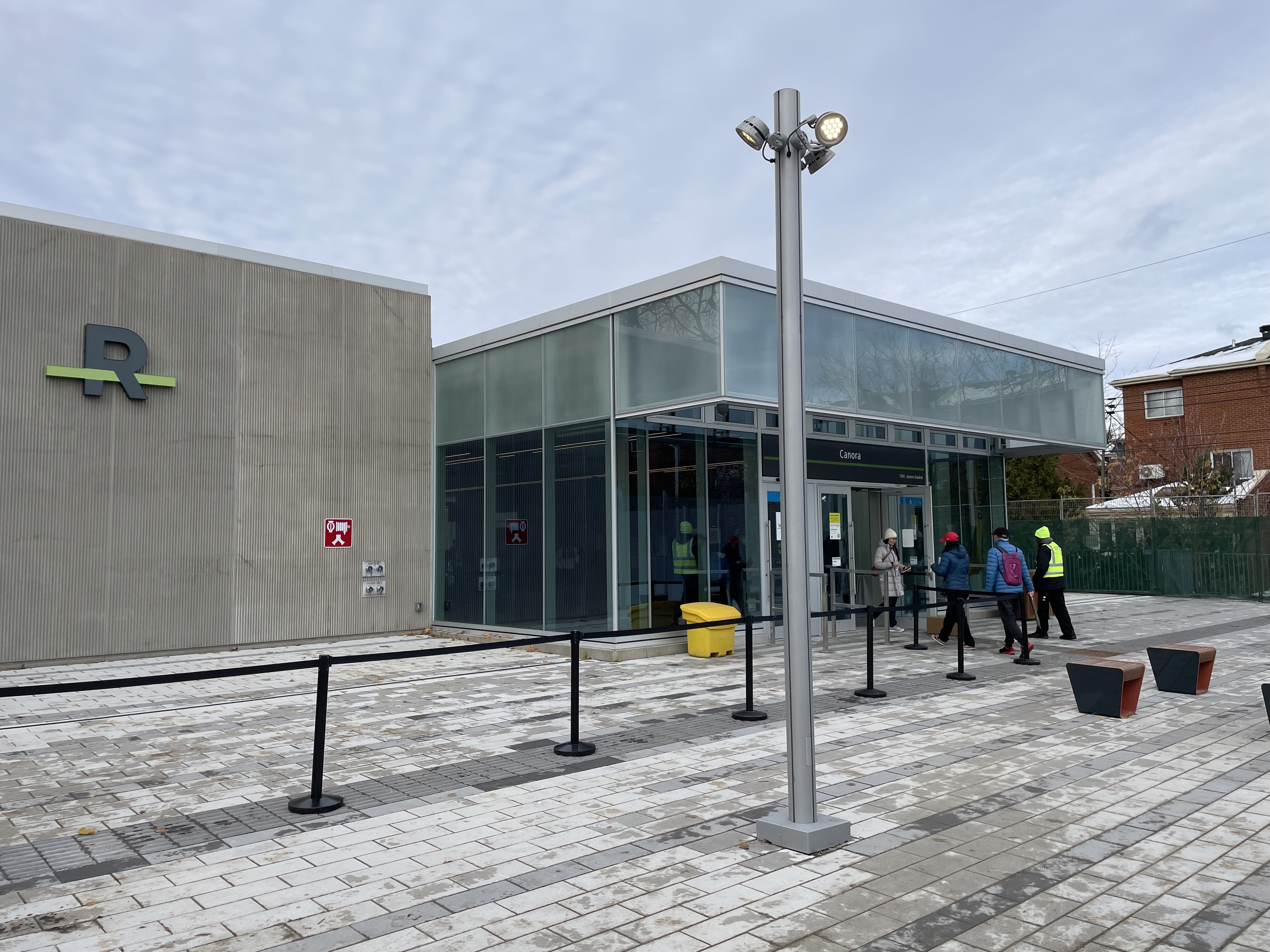
Canora station on the Réseau express métropolitain.

Côte-des-Neiges–Notre-Dame-de-Grâce is served by two lines and ten stations of the Montreal Metro. There are seven stations in the borough on the Orange Line: Vendôme and Villa-Maria stations in Notre-Dame-de-Grâce, and Snowdon, Côte-Sainte-Catherine, Plamondon, Namur and De La Savane stations in Côte-des-Neiges. The borough is served by four stations on the Blue Line, all of which are in Côte-des-Neiges: Snowdon, Côte-des-Neiges, Université-de-Montréal and Édouard-Montpetit.

The Réseau express métropolitain serves two stations in Côte-des-Neiges: Édouard-Montpetit and Canora.

Vendôme station, in Notre-Dame-de-Grâce, is served by three lines of the Réseau de transport métropolitain's commuter rail network: the Vaudreuil-Hudson line, the Saint-Jérôme line and the Candiac line.

The borough is traversed by the Décarie Expressway.

== Education ==
=== Colleges and universities ===
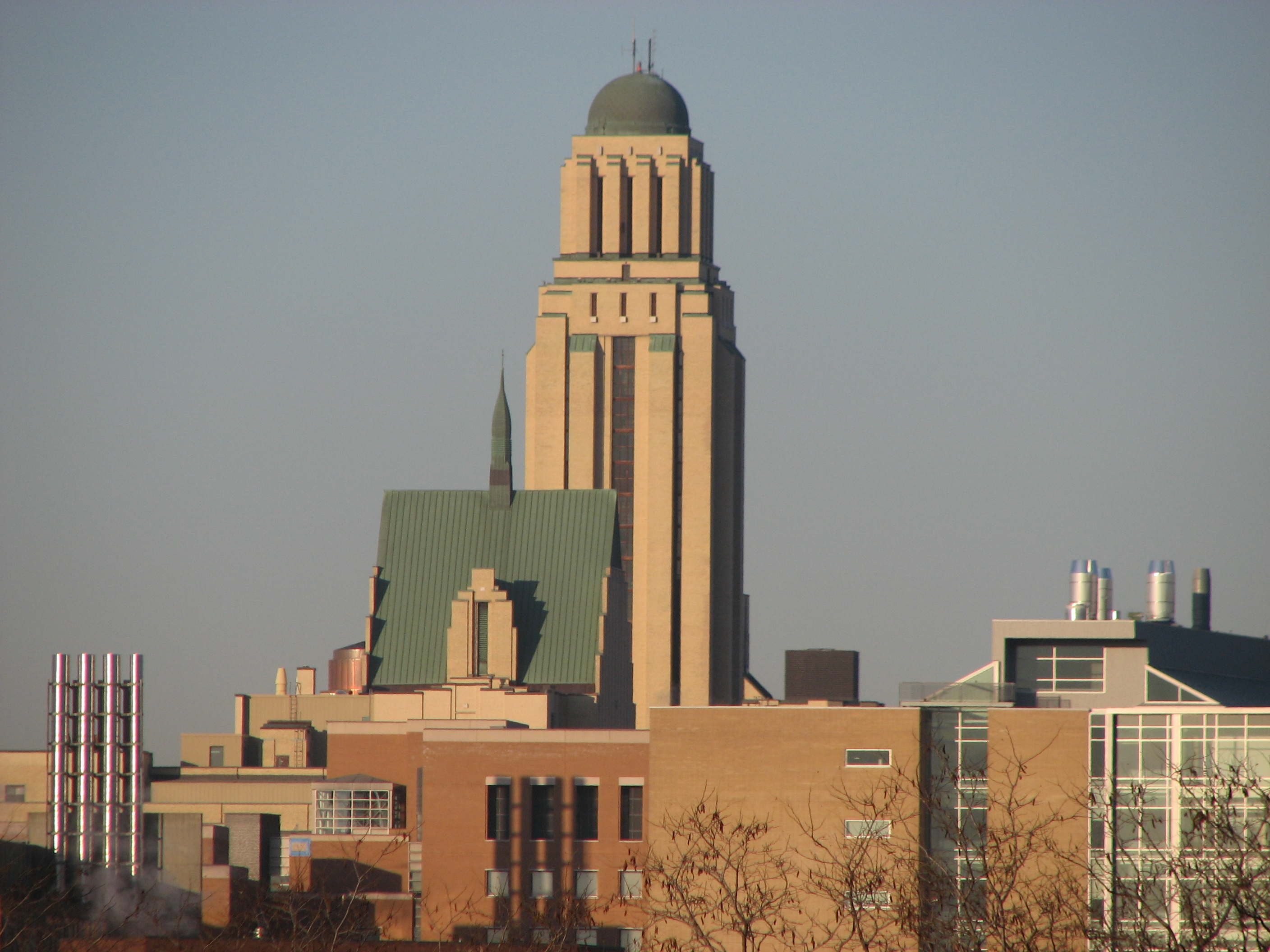
The Roger-Gaudry pavilion of the Université de Montréal.

Two universities are located in the borough. Université de Montréal and École Polytechnique de Montréal are located on Édouard Montpetit Boulevard in Côte-des-Neiges. HEC Montréal, the independent affiliated business school of Université de Montréal, is located nearby on Côte-Sainte-Catherine Road.

Concordia University's Loyola campus, is located on Sherbrooke Street West in Notre-Dame-de-Grâce, near Montreal West.

=== Primary and secondary schools ===
The Commission scolaire de Montréal operates Francophone public schools.

The English Montreal School Board (EMSB) operates Anglophone public schools.

Several private high schools are located in the borough. These include the francophone Collège Jean-de-Brébeuf, Collège Notre-Dame and Collège International Marie de France, the bilingual Villa Maria High School and the anglophone Lower Canada College, Loyola High School and College Prep International.

=== Public libraries ===
The borough has four libraries of the Montreal Public Libraries Network: Benny, Bibliothèque interculturelle, Côte-des-Neiges, and Notre-Dame-de-Grâce.

== Attractions ==
Attractions in the borough include the Segal Centre for Performing Arts, Snowdon Theatre, the Empress Theatre, Saint Joseph's Oratory and the Gibeau Orange Julep fast-food restaurant. Other attractions also include the Montreal Holocaust Memorial Center and the Spanish and Portuguese Synagogue of Montreal. The Notre-Dame-des-Neiges Cemetery is also located in the borough. In 2024, Elie-Wiesel Park was inaugurated on de Courtrai Avenue near Décarie Boulevard and Westbury Avenue in the Snowdon district in the borough in honour of Elie Wiesel, the Holocaust survivor, writer, professor, and Nobel Peace Prize winner; it has a playground, relaxation area, walking trails, furniture, green spaces, and unique water features.

== Demographics ==
Historical populations
Year	Pop.	±%
1966	183,288	—
1971	177,470	−3.2%
1976	166,103	−6.4%
1981	151,729	−8.7%
1986	151,926	+0.1%
1991	154,350	+1.6%
1996	158,930	+3.0%
2001	164,806	+3.7%
2006	164,246	−0.3%
2011	165,031	+0.5%
2016	166,520	+0.9%
2021	170,583	+2.4%

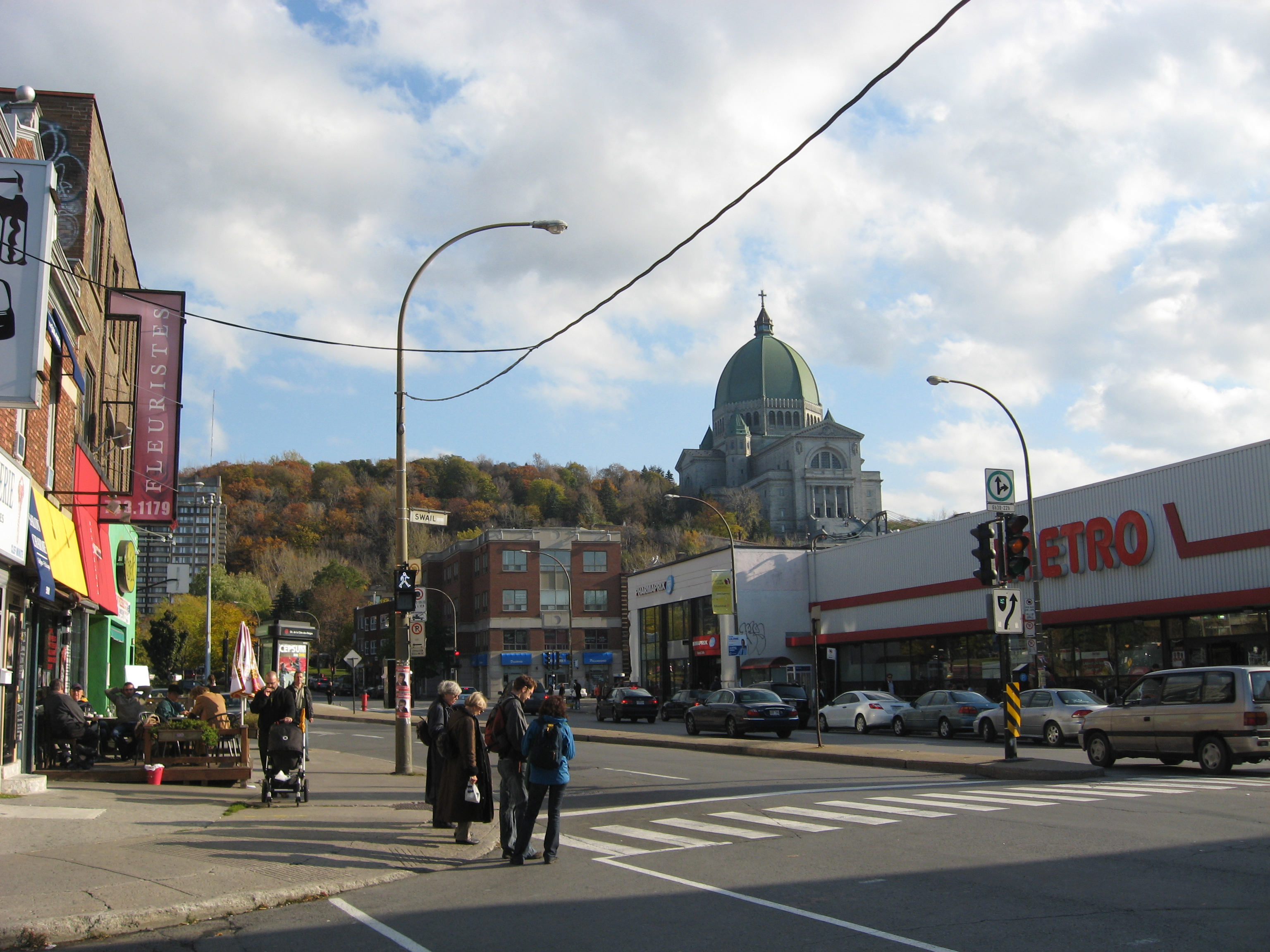
Saint Joseph's Oratory as seen from Côte-des-Neiges Road.

Home language
Language	Population	Percentage (%)
French	49,235	30%
English	56,375	39%
Other languages	40,445	28%

Mother Tongue
Language	Population	Percentage (%)
French	45,395	30%
English	42,410	27%
Other languages	66,175	43%

Visible Minorities (2021)
Ethnicity	Population	Percentage (%)
Not a visible minority	81,640	48.7%
Visible minorities	85,870	51.3%

Source: ^{,}

== See also ==
- Boroughs of Montreal
- Districts of Montreal
- Municipal reorganization in Quebec
