= Saint-Jacques Escarpment =

Coordinates: 45°27′36″N 73°37′19″W

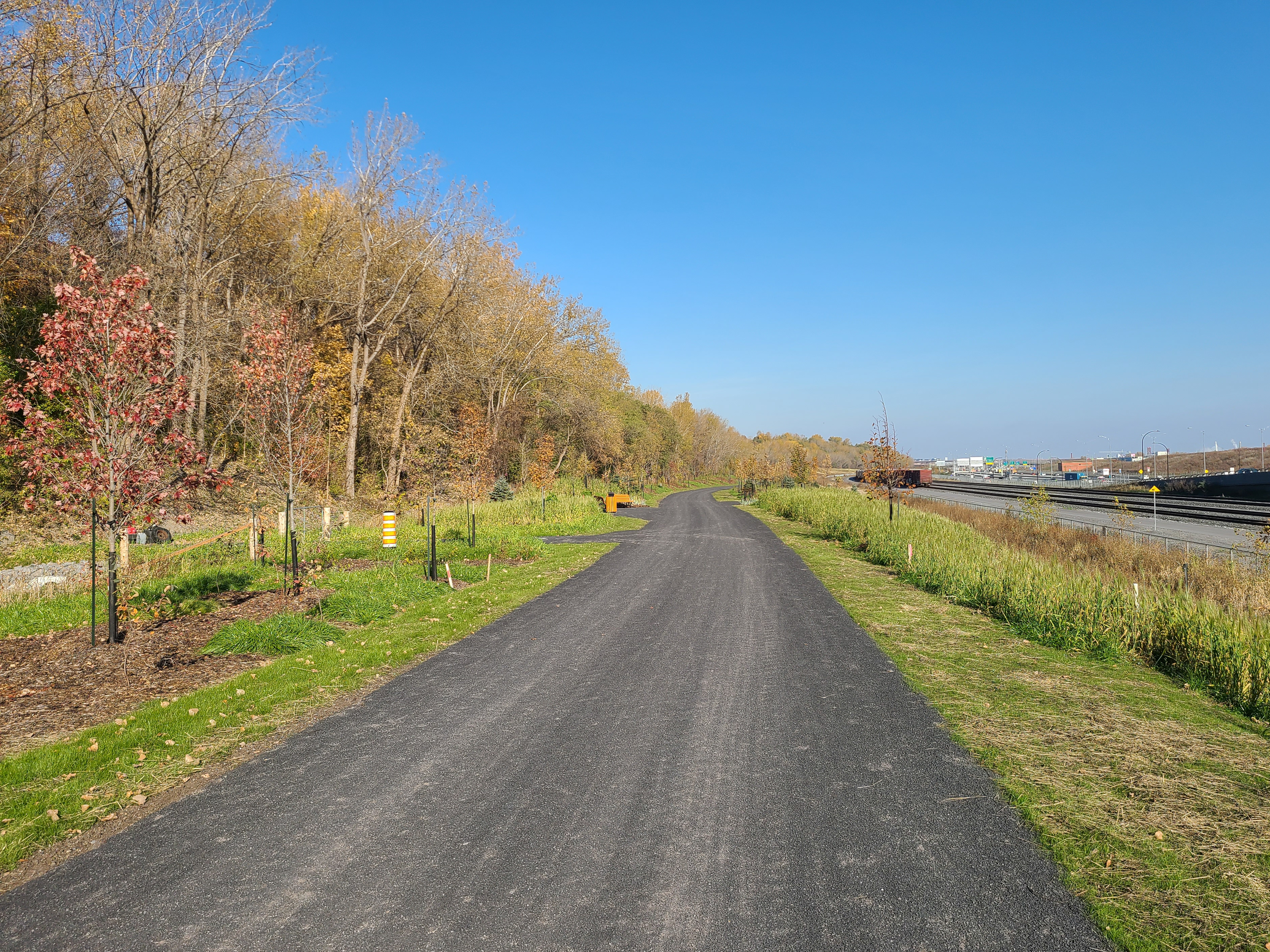
Falaise Saint-Jacques, looking east, from near the west entrance. (November 2021)

The Saint-Jacques Escarpment (French: Falaise Saint-Jacques, pronounced [falɛz sɛ̃ ʒak]) is a green space along an escarpment in the city of Montreal, west of downtown Montreal and adjacent to the neighbourhood of Notre-Dame-de-Grâce. The wooded area stretches 3 km (2 mi) long, covering over 20 ha (49 acres).

The escarpment's dense stands of poplar trees and its location between Mount Royal and the Lachine Rapids make it notable for a number of species of resident and migratory birds and a large population of brown snakes.

The land at the foot of the escarpment was previously known as a body of water named "Lac St-Pierre". The lake started losing its water with the opening of the Lachine Canal in the year 1825.

The escarpment had served as a dumping ground before it was purchased by the City of Montreal for use as parkland, but until 2021 it was not open to the public. Plans to allow public access were frequently delayed because parts of the slope are unstable and dangerous, and the city's desire to preserve the escarpment as a natural space conflicted with the Province of Quebec's plans for redevelopment of the Turcot Interchange, which include moving the Ville-Marie Expressway and Canadian National Railway line next to the foot of the escarpment.

In 2020, the city of Montreal announced a proposal to turn much of the space into a park that would stretch nearly 2 kilometres (1.2 mi).

In 2021, the 2.7 kilometres (1.7 mi) long park was opened to the public. The west entrance is at Sainte-Anne de Bellevue Boulevard and Brock Avenue South. The east entrance is at Rue Pullman, just northwest of the Turcot Interchange.
