= Snowdon Theatre (Montreal) =

Cinema in Montreal, Quebec, Canada

Coordinates: 45.48499°N 73.63112°W

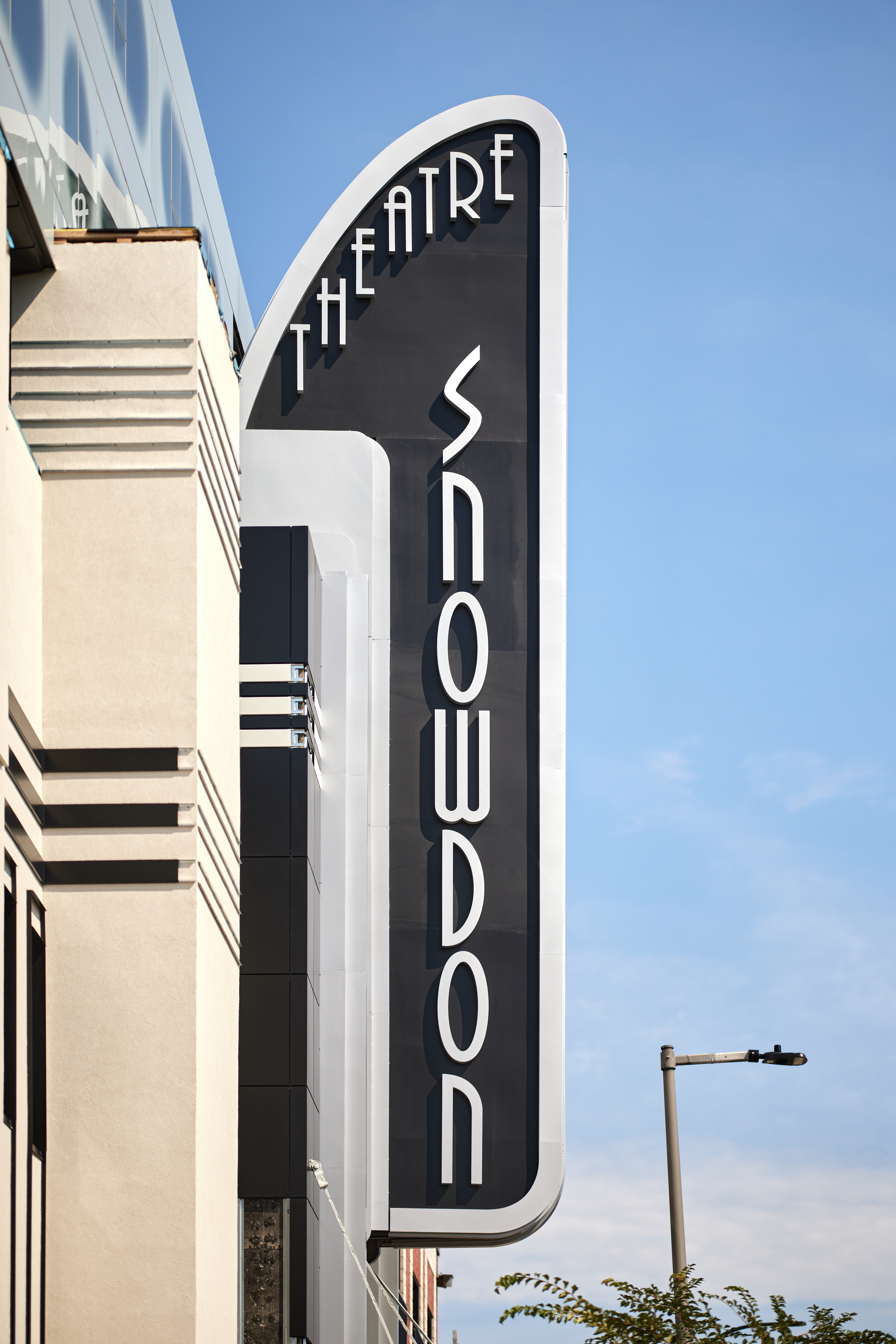
Snowdon Theatre exterior in 2022 after redevelopment

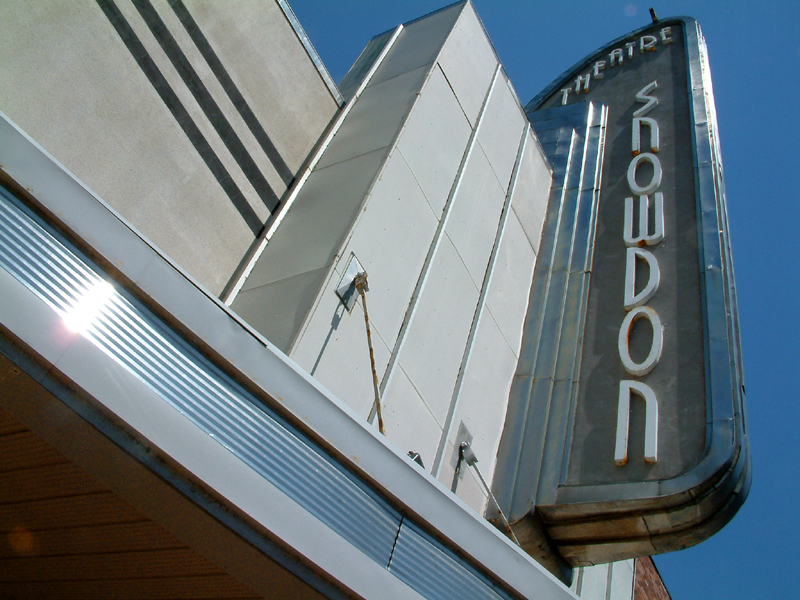
The Snowdon Theatre marquee in 2006

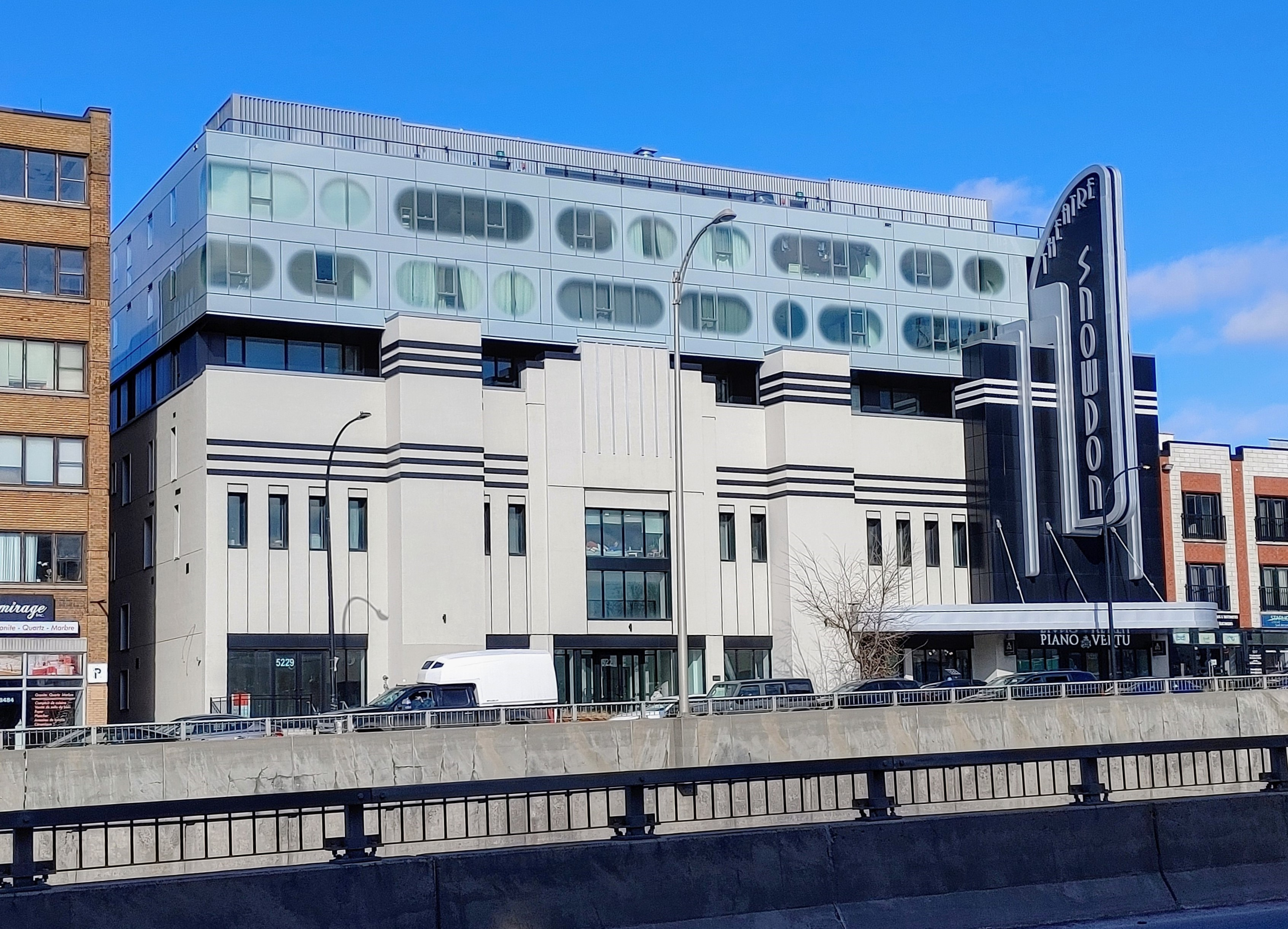
Théâtre Snowdon Condominiums

The Snowdon Theatre was a Streamline Moderne style cinema in Montreal, Quebec, Canada, located on Decarie Boulevard in the neighbourhood of Snowdon. For 45 years it operated as a movie theater for films. After the theater closed, it was re-purposed as mini-shopping center with gymnastics studio, the latter of which had preserved former theater's lavish art deco interior. In 2019, following years of abandonment and neglect, it was demolished, with only its exterior facade left (heavily modified) as a decorative front for newly constructed condominiums.

== History ==
The theater opened in February 1937 with a lavish art deco interior by designer Emmanuel Briffa, designer of the interior of the Rialto Theatre and 60 other cinemas in Canada.

In 1950 the entrance facade was modified and a new marquee was added. In 1968 it showed X-rated movies. In 1972 it screened Charlie Chaplin films for approximately an entire year. The cinema, after 45 years of showing films, closed in May 1982 and was left vacant.

In 1990 it was re-purposed as a small shopping center. The 25,000 square foot interior was rebuilt by Rafid Louis and Emile Fattal, splitting the theater into two floors and sub-dividing the ground floor space. The theater's original wall and ceiling art deco remained intact on the second floor, where a gymnastics center operated for a number of years. However, the building was not a success with its retail shopping and offices, and by the late 1990s, was mostly vacant again.

In 2013, Flexart Gymnastics, the last tenant, was evicted in late 2013 due to safety concerns with the building's roof, leaving the building boarded up and left abandoned.

== Demolition ==
In January 2016, the city of Montreal, who owned the neglected and deteriorating building, put it up for sale. On March 26, 2016, a fire start by vandals on the second floor caused heavy damage to the roof. On May 4, 2017, the city found a buyer, who planned to demolish it for either a commercial or residential building project. The sale went through on February 3, 2018, for $1.6 million, with the only condition that the building's exterior front facade and sign be preserved.

In April 2019, the building was completely demolished, with only the front façade wall left standing and attached marquee (that had been modified in the late 80's with a French descriptor). By 2022, condominium construction was completed behind the remaining facade, albeit heavily modified.
