= College Prep International =

Location
- 7475 Sherbrooke St. West; Montreal, Quebec, H4B 1S3; Canada; 45.454295°N 73.642262°W

Information
- School type: Independent
- Motto: Bringing Students Together from Around the World
- Established: 1944
- Administrator: Juraj Pojtek
- Headmaster: Mark Diaczun
- Grades: 5–11
- Enrollment: 150
- Language: English
- Area: Notre Dame de Grace
- Website: www.prepinternational.com

College Prep International is an English-language elementary and secondary-level private school in Montreal, Quebec, Canada.

The school was established in 1944 by Abraham Brodsky and Phillip Finkel as Prep School of Montreal and in 1993 changed its name to College Prep International.

College Prep International offers education from elementary 5 through secondary 5.

== History ==
In 1944, Abraham Brodsky organized classes for Graduates of Sir George Williams University where he was a teacher. By 1947 Phillip Finkel joined his fellow Graduate A. Brodsky and started their own tutorial school at 4240 Girouard Ave. and the name Prep School of Montreal was established. From 1947 they taught elementary and high school subjects to students from grade 1 through grade 11. During evenings Prep School offered adult education.

College Prep was known for helping students through small classes and good discipline, to achieve their high school diplomas. In 1977 Ursulene T. Mora joined Prep School and started changing its profile to high academics. The name College Prep International was registered in 1993 and the school moved to its present home at 7475 Sherbrooke West.

Ashton Livingston joined Prep School in 1950. Steve Lawrence was an academic advisor from 1960. Bhagwan Sadaranganey was an academic advisor from 1970. Donna Vaicekauskas was an academic advisor from 1990. Cheryl Selby was a teacher from 1974 to 1978.
