= Hampstead, Quebec =

Hampstead
- City
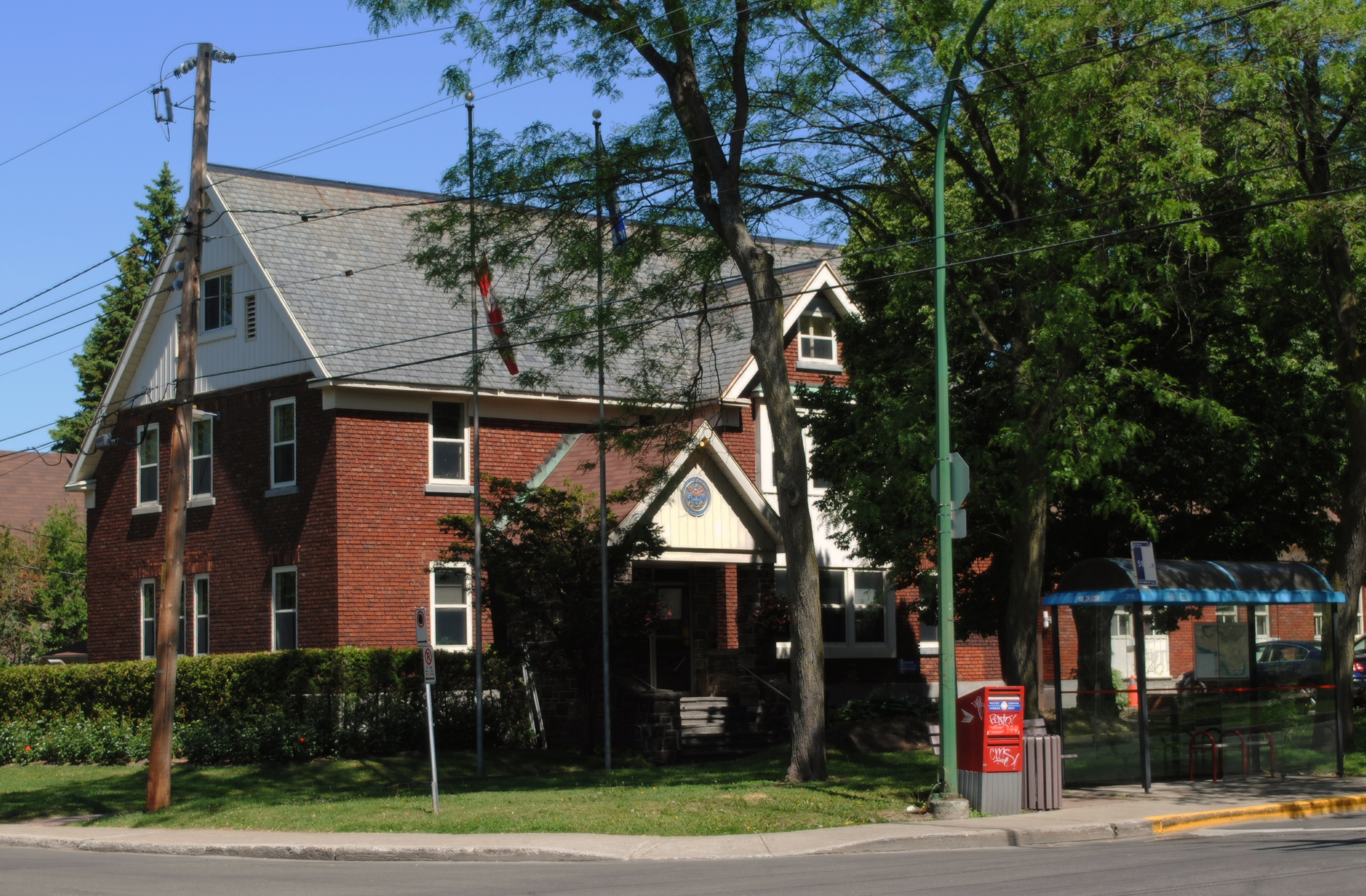
- Hampstead Town Hall

- Coat of arms
- Nickname: Garden City
- Location on the Island of Montreal

- Location in southern Quebec
- Coordinates: 45°29′N 73°38′W
- Country: Canada
- Province: Quebec
- Region: Montreal
- RCM: None
- Constituted: January 1, 2006
- Named for: Hampstead, London

Government
  - Mayor: Jeremy Levi
  - Federal riding: Mount Royal
  - Prov. riding: D'Arcy-McGee

Area
  - Total: 1.77 km^{2} (0.68 sq mi)
  - Land: 1.79 km^{2} (0.69 sq mi)
- There is an apparent discrepancy between 2 authoritative sources.

Population (2021)
  - Total: 7,037
  - Density: 3,922.1/km^{2} (10,158/sq mi)
  - Pop. 2016-2021: ▲0.9%
  - Dwellings: 2,622
- Time zone: UTC−5 (EST)
  - Summer (DST): UTC−4 (EDT)
- Postal code(s): H3X
- Area codes: 514 and 438
- Highways: No major routes
- Website: www.hampstead.qc.ca

Hampstead is an on-island suburb of Montreal, Quebec, Canada. It is an independent municipality bordering the municipality of Côte Saint-Luc and the Côte-des-Neiges–Notre-Dame-de-Grâce borough of Montreal. The municipality has the highest percentage of Jewish population of any town in Canada, at 64% of the population.

== History ==
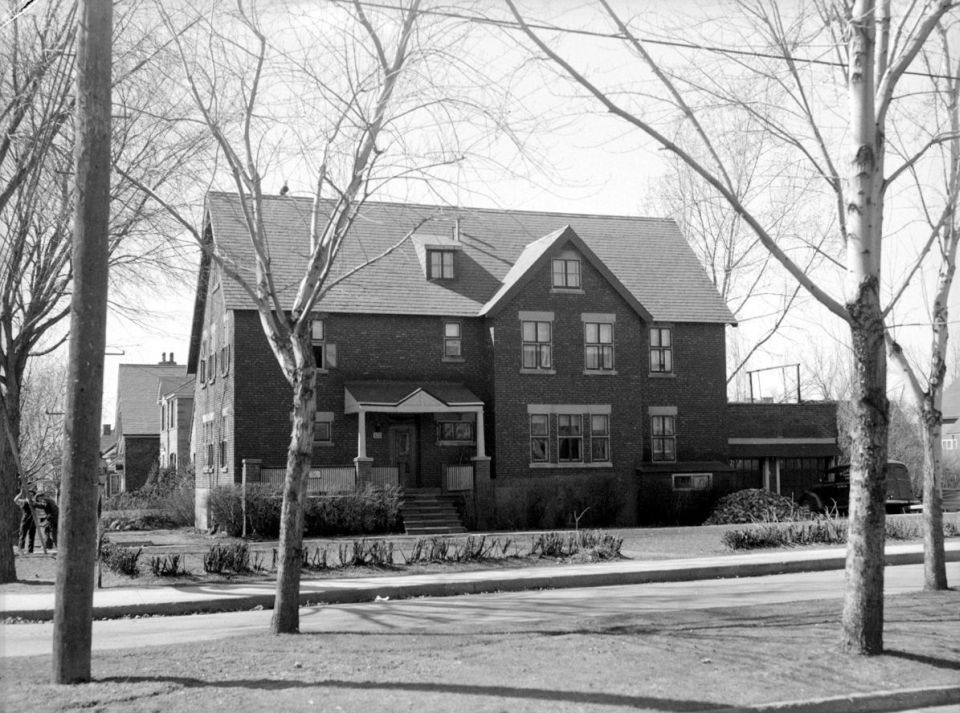
Hampstead Town Hall in 1943.

The Town of Hampstead was founded in 1914 by a group of eight Montreal businessmen, among them Sir Herbert Holt, president of the Hampstead Land and Construction Company, and Charles Blair Gordon, its vice-president. It was designed to be an exclusive garden city. There are no retail shops within municipal boundaries. Houses were assigned relatively large lots to allow space for trees and shrubbery. The town's roads were designed with curves in order to slow down traffic and to create an interesting and intimate landscape. Despite its rather flat topography—much of the territory was once a golf course—the town was named after another garden city, the London suburb of Hampstead Village. Like its namesake, Hampstead is the home of many affluent citizens, and competes with a few other suburbs for first place in the rankings of highest average household incomes in Canada.

=== Merger and demerger ===
On January 1, 2002, as part of the 2002–06 municipal reorganization of Montreal, it was merged with Côte-Saint-Luc and Montreal West and became the Côte-Saint-Luc–Hampstead–Montréal-Ouest borough of the City of Montreal. However, after a change of government and a 2004 referendum, all three were re-constituted as independent cities on January 1, 2006.

== Demographics ==
Historical populations
Year	Pop.	±%
1966	6,158	—
1971	7,035	+14.2%
1976	7,562	+7.5%
1981	7,598	+0.5%
1986	7,886	+3.8%
1991	7,219	−8.5%
1996	6,986	−3.2%
2001	6,974	−0.2%
2006	6,996	+0.3%
2011	7,153	+2.2%
2016	6,973	−2.5%
2021	7,037	+0.9%
Source: Statistics Canada

According to the Office québécois de la langue française, Hampstead has been officially recognized as a bilingual municipality since November 2, 2005.

In the 2021 Census of Population conducted by Statistics Canada, Hampstead had a population of 7,037 living in 2,493 of its 2,622 total private dwellings, a change of 0.9% from its 2016 population of 6,973. With a land area of 1.79 km^{2} (0.69 sq mi), it had a population density of 3,931.3/km^{2} (10,182.0/sq mi) in 2021.

Canada census – Hampstead community profile

	2021	2016
Population	7,037 (+0.9% from 2016)	6,973 (-2.5% from 2011)
Land area	1.79 km^{2} (0.69 sq mi)	1.80 km^{2} (0.69 sq mi)
Population density	3,922.1/km^{2} (10,158/sq mi)	3,884.2/km^{2} (10,060/sq mi)
Median age	39.6 (M: 38.8, F: 40.4)	40.8 (M: 39.3, F: 41.6)
Private dwellings	2,622 (total) 2,493 (occupied)	2,623 (total)
Median household income	$150,000	$122,496

References: 2021 2016

Canada 2006 Census		Population	% of Total Population
Visible minority group	South Asian	45	0.6
Visible minority group	Chinese	55	0.8
Visible minority group	Black	145	2.1
Visible minority group	Filipino	130	1.9
Visible minority group	Latin American	80	1.1
Visible minority group	Southeast Asian	45	0.6
Visible minority group	Other visible minority	155	2.3
Total visible minority population		655	9.4
Aboriginal group	First Nations	0	0
Aboriginal group	Métis	0	0
Aboriginal group	Inuit	0	0
Total Aboriginal population		0	0
White		6,340	90.6
Total population		6,995	100

In terms of mother tongue, the 2006 census found that, including multiple responses, almost 63% of residents spoke English, and about 16% of residents spoke French. The next most commonly reported first languages learned were Hebrew, Yiddish, Polish and Romanian.

Mother Tongue	Population (2006)	Percentage (2006)	Population (2016)	Percentage (2016)
English	4,260	60.9%	3,950	56.7%
French	975	13.9%	1,255	18.0%
English and French	45	0.6%	130	1.9%
English and a non-official language	55	0.8%	70	1.0%
French and a non-official language	85	1.2%	45	0.6%
English, French and a non-official language	20	0.3%	35	0.5%
Hebrew	240	3.4%	150	2.2%
Yiddish	175	2.5%	75	1.1%
Polish	160	2.3%	30	0.4%
Romanian	145	2.1%	100	1.4%
Spanish	135	1.9%	145	2.1%
Arabic	110	1.6%	110	1.6%
Korean	90	1.3%	60	0.9%
Hungarian	65	0.9%	45	0.6%
Tagalog	60	0.9%	70	1.0%
Chinese	45	0.6%	115	1.6%
Italian	40	0.6%	65	0.9%
Russian	40	0.6%	80	1.1%
German	35	0.5%	40	0.6%
Persian	35	0.5%	135	1.9%
Vietnamese	35	0.5%	40	0.6%
Bisayan	20	0.3%		
Greek	20	0.3%	35	0.5%
Serbian	20	0.3%	25	0.4%

Home language (2006, 2011 and 2016)
Language	Population (2006)	Percentage (2006)	Population (2011)	Percentage (2011)	Population (2016)	Percentage (2016)
English	5,440	77.77%	5,190	72.53%	4,830	69.30%
French	890	12.72%	1,045	14.61%	1,065	15.28%
Both English and French	70	1.00%	120	1.68%	130	1.87%
Other languages	590	8.43%	585	8.18%	720	10.33%

The town is noted for having the highest percentage of Jewish residents of any city in Canada, and the third highest worldwide outside Israel.

Religion (2001)	Population	Percentage	% (of total in Quebec)
Jewish	5,170	74.2%	5.75%
Catholic	760	10.9%	0.01%
No religious affiliation	300	4.3%	0.07%
Protestant	295	4.2%	0.09%
Christian Orthodox	280	4%	0.28%
Muslim	45	0.6%	0.04%
Buddhist	75	1.1%	0.18%
Christian, n.i.e.	25	0.4%	0.04%
Hindu	15	0.2%	0.06%
Other	10	0.1%	0.26%

== Local government ==
In the November 6, 2005 municipal elections, William (Bill) Steinberg was elected mayor of Hampstead. Steinberg was the first new mayor after 4 years of civic control by Gérald Tremblay, when Hampstead was part of Montreal. Mayor Steinberg defeated Irving Adessky who had been mayor for 27 years (1974-2001) and former councillor Gerald Kestner. In his honour, the community centre has been renamed after him. Steinberg was re-elected on November 1, 2009 defeating former town councillor David Sternthal with 61% of the vote. On November 3, 2013 Mayor Steinberg was re-elected for a third term defeating former town councillor Bonnie Feigenbaum with 61.21% of the vote (voter turnout was 44.5%). In the 2017 Municipal Elections, Steinberg, Warren Budning, Harvey Shaffer, Jack Edery, and Michael Goldwax were acclaimed. Bill Steinberg served as Mayor for 16 years (2005-2021).

Current Government:

- Mayor: Jeremy Levi
- Councillors:

1. Leon Elfassy
2. Jack Edery
3. Harvey Shaffer
4. Michael Goldwax
5. Warren Budning
6. Jason Farber

Mayor Jeremy Levi attracted controversy for flying the flag of Israel outside the town hall, and for saying he supports "full occupation and annexation of Gaza" amid the Gaza war.

=== Former mayors ===
List of former mayors:

- James Baillie (1914–1924)
- James A. Baillie (1924–1928, 1930–1932)
- William Schuyler Lighthall (1928–1930)
- Archibald F. Byers (1932–1935)
- Vincent E. Scully (1935–1936)
- Hartland Glaspell Parsons (1936–1948)
- Lyman Ira Playfair (1948–1964)
- Stuart Milnet Finlayson (1964–1974)
- Irving L. Adessky (1974–2001)
- William Steinberg (2005–2021)
- Jeremy Levi (2021–present)

== Transportation ==
Two major thoroughfares exist in Hampstead. One is Queen Mary Road and the other is Fleet Road.

Hampstead is accessible by the following STM bus lines: 51 Édouard-Montpetit (Queen-Mary), 66 The Boulevard (Côte-Saint-Luc), 161 Van Horne (Fleet), 166 Queen Mary (Macdonald).

There were various stages of development for Hampstead. The newer areas tend to be to the north and to the west. The city is almost completely composed of single family residences, except for the apartment buildings on Côte-Saint-Luc Road, and the duplexes and triplexes along MacDonald, Cleve, Dufferin, Heath, Holtham, Harrow and Aldred Roads. There are no commercial properties in the city. There is only one school in the city, the Hampstead Elementary School, which is public.

At the beginning of each summer is Hampstead Day, which features a small carnival and fireworks, curated by the staff of the Hampstead Pool and of the Hampstead Day Camp.

== International relations ==
=== Twin towns — Sister cities ===
Hampstead is twinned with:

- Kiryat Shmona, Israel (since 1978)

== See also ==
- List of anglophone communities in Quebec
- People from the Town of Hampstead
