= Royal Vale School =

Location
- 5851, avenue Somerled; Montreal, Quebec, H3X 2A5; Canada
- Coordinates: 45.4753°N 73.6326°W

Information
- Founded: September 1988
- School board: English Montreal School Board
- Principal: Mauro Zampini
- Grades: K–11
- Language: French immersion
- Website: www.emsb.qc.ca/royalvale/

Royal Vale School (French: École Royal Vale) is a K–11 language immersion school in Region 3 of the English Montreal School Board. Students graduate from Royal Vale with a bilingual certificate.

The school has a focus on math and science.

== History ==
Royal Vale School existed at the Dupuis location as an elementary school in the Protestant School Board of Greater Montreal from before 1959 through 1963 and beyond. In a more recent iteration (?), it opened to receive its first 125 students (from pre-kindergarten to grade 5) in September 1988 also at the Dupuis location. The project was initiated by Caroline Kramer-Zilkha, who had a vision of creating an enriched math/science school. After putting an ad in the local community paper, parental interest was overwhelming. With a dedicated group of parents, including Donna Cooper and Marla Shuster, a steering committee was formed and the model for Royal Vale School was created. The school would offer full French immersion, with an emphasis on math and science and include a compulsory 1 hour supplemental program at the end of the day which offered both Jewish Heritage Studies and academic enrichment.

Classes expanded the next year to include grade 6, reaching a population of 325 students.

In 1992, Royal Vale moved to its present location on Somerled Avenue in Notre-Dame-de-Grâce, at the former Westhill High School. Within five years, three secondary classes were added at each grade level. Presently the school offers a complete program from Kindergarten to Secondary V. The current school population is stable, with an enrollment of 550 secondary students and 500 elementary students. There continue to be overnight lineups for registration each year.
