= Côte-Saint-Luc Road =

Road in Montreal, Quebec, Canada

- Native name: chemin de la Côte-Saint-Luc (French)
- Location: Island of Montreal
- Coordinates: 45°28′19.6″N 73°38′50″W
- West end: Meadowbrook Golf Club, Côte-Saint-Luc
- East end: Victoria Avenue, Westmount

Côte-Saint-Luc Road (officially in French: chemin de la Côte-Saint-Luc) is a street on the island of Montreal. It dates back to the French regime and used to comprise what is now Queen Mary Road. It begins at the Meadowbrook Golf Club in Côte-Saint-Luc and extends east to the Westmount border, where it joins The Boulevard. Along the way, it defines the border between the Montreal borough of Notre-Dame-de-Grâce on the south and the cities of Hampstead and Côte-Saint-Luc on the north.

== History ==
The first home was constructed on present Côte-Saint-Luc Road in 1925.
