= John F. Kennedy High School (Montreal) =

Location
- 3030, rue Villeray Est; Montreal, Quebec, H2A 1E7; Canada; 45.5601°N 73.6040°W

Information
- School type: Public, High School
- Established: 1964
- School board: English Montreal School Board
- Principal: L. Fumidinisi (interim)
- Grades: 7-11 (Secondary 1-5)
- Enrollment: 425
- Campus: High School Building
- Colours: white, black
- Website: emsb.qc.ca/jfk/

John F. Kennedy High School (French: École secondaire John F. Kennedy) is a public high school located in Montreal, Quebec, Canada. The school is operated by the English Montreal School Board.

Until 1998, it was operated by the Montreal Catholic School Commission.

== Athletics ==
John F. Kennedy High School has soccer and basketball teams in the bantam (secondary 1-2), midget (secondary 2-3), and juvenile (secondary 4-5) divisions of the GMAA (Greater Montreal Area Athletics), for boys and girls except for bantam girl teams. Their teams regularly compete with other schools in the Greater Montreal Athletics Association (GMAA). The teams are the JFK Knights. The school also has a juvenile boys (secondary 4-5) badminton team and, since the beginning of the 2013–2014 academic school year, an ice hockey training camp. Every Tuesday, players in the training camp have an early dismissal at 2:30 to leave to go to the local public arena for practice ay Saint Michel Arena. Practice starts at 3:00 and ends at 4:30. The hockey camp is a division of the Ahunstic Braves. The training season ends in may. The camp is not part of the GMAA. The school also participates every year in April in the GMAA halo race on top of Mount Royal. For the whole month of April, participants need 16 kilometers of training. They won 2024-2025 basketball championship

== Asbestos ==
On May 9, 2012, principal Joseph Marra discovered suspected asbestos fibres in the two ventilation rooms in the school's basement. The next day, the fibres were tested, and the results were negative, but Marra closed the school for a week. Students were relocated to Rosemount High School until the cleanup had been completed. In July 2012, more fibres were found, and this time, test results were positive. Students and staff returned to the John F. Kennedy facility on May 25, 2013, after a year since the discovery of the asbestos fibres. They made the municipal news and media. The cost of the clean up is 2.8 million dollars, which sparked a lot of controversy at the school board. Originally, the cost was supposed to be 1.1 million dollars.

== See also ==
- List of buildings and monuments honoring presidents of the United States in other countries
