= Perspectives II High School =

School in Montreal, Canada

Coordinates: 45°34′5″N 73°36′1″W

Perspectives II High School is an outreach high school in Montreal, Quebec, Canada. It is run under the English Montreal School Board. PII (as it is known) formed at the start of the 2003-2004 academic year as an Outreach school dedicated to helping east-end EMSB students adapt to a new academic environment after experiencing difficulties in a regular high school.

== Objectives ==
PII objectives are to offer a nurturing, safe and non-intimidating learning environment in order to foster individual academic success and to help students acquire appropriate social and behavioral skills. This academic approach is intended to help individuals attain academic success, increase self-esteem, achieve self-motivation, independence and self-reliance in learning. The program attempts to deal with the individual needs and personal development of the students as well as their academic and social needs.

== Application Procedure ==
All students at Perspectives II go through a referral and interview process involving the student, a parent, and the school staff. Interviews take place prior to the new school year in June and in August.

== Athletics Department ==
The PII Pitbulls have Jiu-Jitsu, Basketball, and Indoor Soccer teams. Their mascot is Java The Wonder Dog, a red-nosed pit bull belonging to one of the coaches.

=== Jiu-Jitsu ===
In 2007, Perspectives I & II High Schools (who share a building) launched a Brazilian jiu-jitsu (BJJ) program. BJJ is the fastest growing sport on the planet today, practiced all over the world by people of all ages and genders. It is a grappling system similar to Olympic Wrestling and nearly identical to the groundwork aspect of Olympic Judo. Its name means 'The Gentle Art' and its philosophy is to defeat opponents using their own energy against them, without striking or using strength unnecessarily.

Despite the individual nature of the sport, the club trains together, as a team, and competes as such at inter-school tournaments in a league created by staff and teachers at some of the member schools. Perspectives I & II compete together against Centennial Regional High School, Beurling Academy, Laval Catholic High School and Marymount Academy.

=== Basketball ===
The PII Pitbulls play in the Alternative Basketball League. The ABL runs with the help of teachers as volunteer team coaches, a School Board-funded ref and snacks from a local organization called Generations. 2009-2010 is the basketball team's first season.

=== Indoor Soccer ===
The PII Pitbulls play in the GMAA indoor soccer league. 2009-2010 is the soccer team's first season.
