= Montreal West High School =

Location
- Easton Avenue; Montreal West, Quebec; Canada; 45.4504°N 73.6431°W

Information
- Established: 1894
- Status: Closed
- Closed: 1983
- Sister school: Royal Vale High School
- School board: Protestant School Board of Greater Montreal
- Language: English

Montreal West High School was a school located in Montreal West, Quebec, Canada. It operated from 1894 to 1983, when it was merged into Royal West Academy.

== History ==
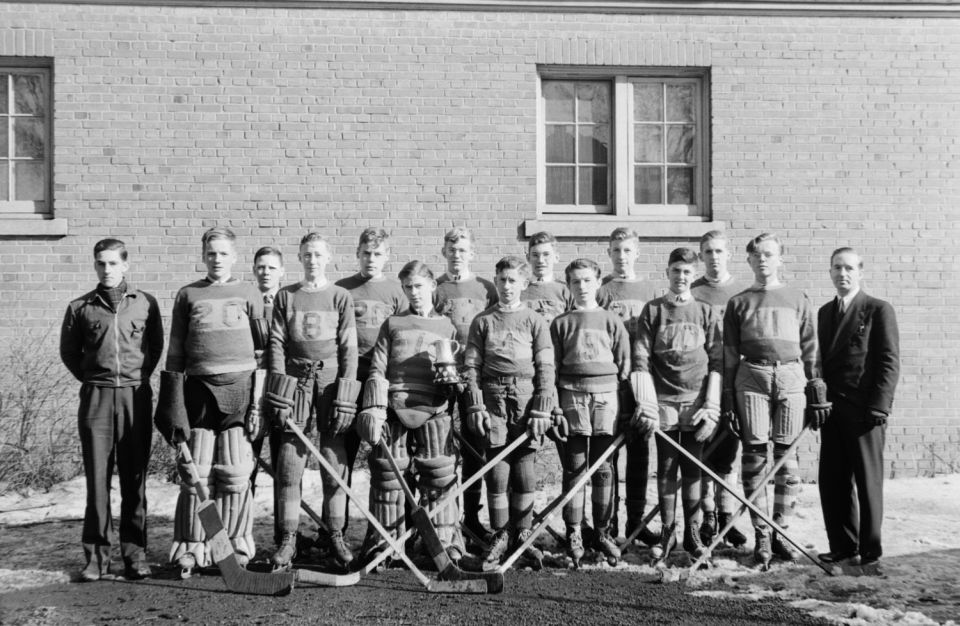
Montreal West High School Junior Hockey Team in 1941

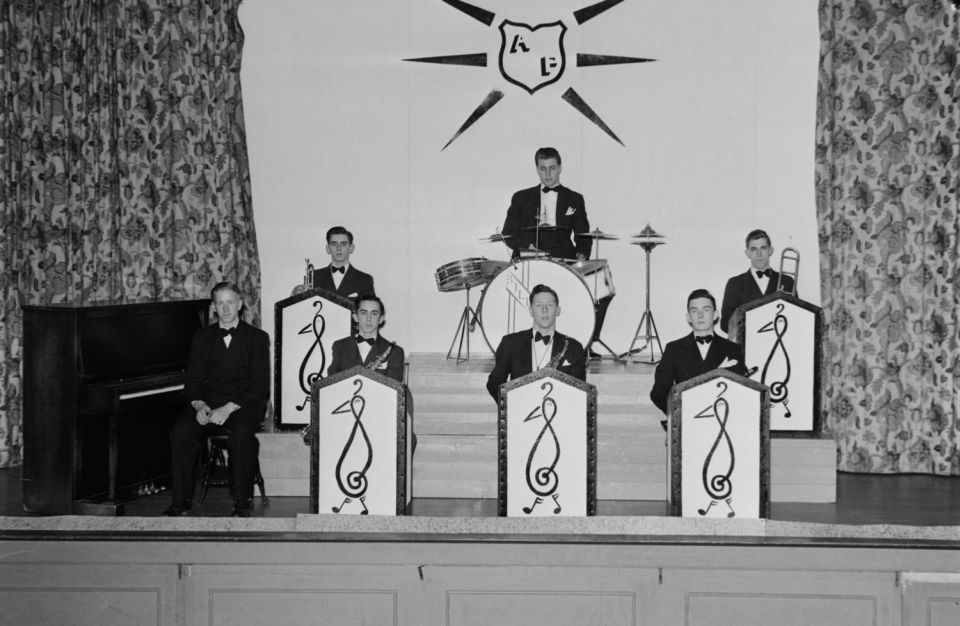
Montreal West High School Dance Band in 1941

It originally opened as the Aberdeen School of Coteau Saint-Pierre, or Aberdeen School, in a two-story school erected in 1894 that housed 200 students on Easton Avenue in Montreal West. The school was often used for social functions, public meetings, and council meetings until the Montreal West Town Hall was built in 1910.

In 1913, 500 Jewish students at Aberdeen School went on strike in response to a Grade 6 teacher's remark that the school's increasing "dirtiness" was related to its growing Jewish population. The teacher never sufficiently apologized and was not transferred to another school (the strikers' only demand), but the Protestant School Board made a point of hiring some Jewish teachers in the following school year.

The name of the school was changed twice: first to Aberdeen Model School and then to Montreal West High School in 1921.

In the 1930s, there was a sharp increase in the school's population. The school was becoming too crowded, and it was decided it was unsafe to house such a large number of students. It was confirmed in 1930 that the school would have to be demolished, beginning on May 7, 1931. That occurred, and the cornerstone for a larger, more permanent building was laid on January 9, 1932, followed by the formal opening ceremony for the new school.

In the early 1980s, declining student enrollment signaled the imminent closure of both Montreal West High School and Royal Vale High School, which shared the same building. In 1982, students, parents, teachers, and administrators put forth a proposal to the Protestant School Board of Greater Montreal (PSGBM), which was precursor to the English Montreal School Board. The proposal called for an "alternative" high school offering programs similar to those of a private school. Limited enrollment, strict discipline, a dress code, fluency in English and French, computer literacy and compulsory extra-curricular activities were to be focal points for the curriculum. The school board would fund the alternative school, but the school committee had to raise money through donations and events (such as a raffle to equip two new computer laboratories).

On January 26, 1983, the school board accepted the proposal for the alternative school. Montreal West High School and Royal Vale High School were replaced in September 1983 by Royal West Academy. Most of the staff and students of both schools remained in the merged school.

In October 2004, the Surete du Quebec began an investigation related to Renwick Spence (1928–2016), once a prominent and popular teacher at the school, who by then had retired. According to victims and former students who talked to the media, most of the alleged abuse was reported to have occurred at Spence's cabin in Morin-Heights. In September 2006, Spence pleaded guilty to charges of abusing seven schoolboys between 1967 and 1981. Although some older students were aware of the allegations at the time, former fellow teachers and administrators denied ever having heard of them.
