= Protestant School Board of Greater Montreal =

Defunct confessional school district in Montreal, Quebec, Canada

Address
- 6000 Fielding Avenue Montreal, Quebec, H3X 1T4; Canada
- Coordinates: 45.4757°N 73.63745°W

District information
- Closed: June 30, 1998

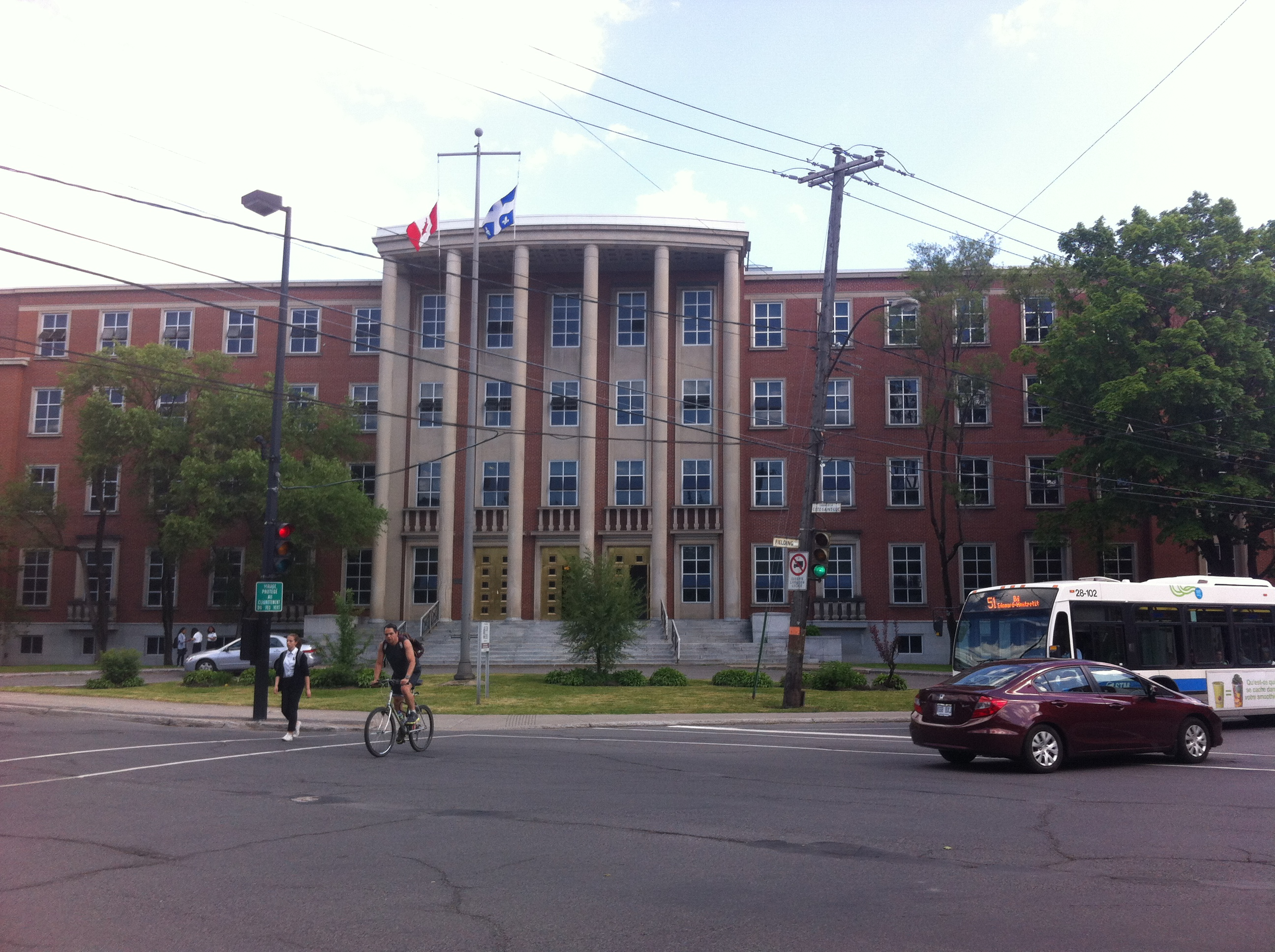
Headquarters at 6000 Fielding

The Protestant School Board of Greater Montreal (PSBGM, Commission des écoles protestantes du Grand Montréal, CEPGM) was a Protestant and predominantly English-language school district in Montreal, Quebec, Canada which was founded in 1951 as a replacement for the Montreal Protestant Central Board, and ceased operations in 1998, with most of its assets transferred to the new English Montreal School Board. Quebec's Protestant school boards served all non Catholics, so that the city's Jewish students generally attended schools operated by the PSBGM.

The PSBGM's headquarters was located at 6000 Fielding Avenue in Montreal, which is now the headquarters for the English Montreal School Board.

== Schools operated ==
This partial list includes some schools that are still in operation and others that have closed or been put to other uses.

=== Elementary schools ===
- Ecole Peace Centennial
- Aberdeen - across from Carré St. Louis
- Alexandria School - Sanguinet below Ste Catherine.
- Alfred Joyce Elementary School
- École Ahuntsic
- Algonquin
- Amherst School - Belanger/Chabot area
- Bancroft School
- Earl Grey - Bellechasse/Christophe colombe
- Barclay School
- Bedford
- Beechwood School
- Berthelet School - Ontario west
- Crawford Park School
- Carlyle School
- Cecil Newman School
- Cedarcrest School
- Connaught School - Ville Emard
- Coronation School
- Cote-des-Neiges
- Courtland Park School
- École Crawford Park
- Dalkeith School in Anjou
- Drummond School - 13th avenue Rosemont.1931-1970
- Dunrae Gardens School
- École Dupuis
- Edinburgh School
- Edouard VII
- Elizabeth Ballantyne School
- F.A.C.E. I & II
- École de la Fraternité
- Gardenview School
- Gilson School - NDG
- Delormier - Gilford and Chabot
- Devonshire
- Dufferin School
- École Glencoe
- École du Grand Chêne
- Guy Drummond
- Hampstead School
- Herbert Purcell School
- École Iona
- Keith School
- École Laurentide
- École Louisbourg
- École Maisonneuve
- Hochelaga School on Prefontaine.
- John Jenkins - Mercier district.
- Lansdowne School
- Logan School
- Lorne School
- McLaren School - Notre Dame Street East
- MacVicar - on Hochelaga St.
- Meadowbrook School
- Merton School
- Mountrose School
- Morison School
- Nesbitt School in Rosemont
- East Hill (formerly Nesbitt School Annex)
- École Ogilvie
- Parkdale School
- École Perce-Neige
- École des Rapides de Lachine
- Riverview School
- École Riviére des Prairies
- Roslyn Elementary School
- Roxboro Elementary School
- Royal Arthur School
- Royal Vale School
- Russell School (TMR)
- Sarah Maxwell on Prefontaine
- Sinclair Laird School
- Sir Arthur Currie School - Rosedale Ave
- Somerled School
- Strathearn School - Jeanne Mance St.
- École Tetreaultville
- Van Horne
- Westbrook Elementary
- École Westminster
- Westmount Park School
- Westpark School
- Willingdon School
- Woodland School

=== High schools ===
- Baron Byng High School
- Malcolm Campbell High School
- École secondaire Cardinal
- Sir Winston Churchill High School, later merged with St. Laurent High School to become LaurenHill Academy
- Connections
- Académie de Roberval
- École secondaire Dorval
- Dunton High School The building was later used for Doran High School, then Aime Renaud High School, and now Academie Dunton
- École secondaire Eureka
- F.A.C.E. III & IV
- Girls' High School
- John Grant High School
- High School of Montreal
- Lachine High School
- LaSalle Extended High School
- École secondaire La Voie
- Le Relais
- M.I.N.D.
- Monklands High School - NDG
- Montreal West High School, later renamed Royal West Academy
- École secondaire Mont-Royal, English until 1985, French thereafter
- Northmount High School
- Northmount Alternative High School
- Options I School
- Options II School
- Outreach
- École secondaire Outremont
- Programme Mile-End
- Riverdale High School
- Riverside Park Academy
- Rosemount High School in Rosemont
- Royal Vale High School
- Shadd Academy
- Strathcona Academy
- Sumerlea Centre
- Verdun High School, later renamed Argyle Academy
- Venture High School
- Vezina High School
- Wagar High School
- Ecole secondaire Wentworth High School - English school with a French immersion component.
- Westmount High School
- West Hill High School
- Ynova

== History ==
The Government of Quebec reorganized the province's public school boards in the mid-1990s. School boards in Quebec had been organized along confessional lines, Catholic and Protestant, since before Canadian Confederation. In fact, Quebec was guaranteed a confessional public school system by the British North America Act, 1867, now known as the Constitution Act, 1867. The provincial government was therefore required to ask the federal government to amend the Canadian Constitution if it were to reorganize school boards along linguistic lines, English and French. The amendment was passed without much debate by both the House of Commons and the Senate, notwithstanding the unresolved constitutional debate between Quebec and the rest of Canada.

The PSBGM held the 1996 PSBGM 150th Anniversary Logo Contest. Debra Shapiro-Lambersky, then a 6th grade student at the Willingdon School, designed the winning logo, showing a group of books surrounding a red heart.

English Montreal School Board and the other new linguistic school boards began operations on July 1, 1998. The English sector of the PSBGM and the English sectors of the Montreal Catholic School Commission, the Commission scolaire Jérôme-Le Royer and the Commission scolaire Sainte-Croix were amalgamated to form the EMSB. The French-language sector became a part of the Commission scolaire de Montréal.

== Labour relations ==
The board's teachers were represented by the Provincial Association of Protestant Teachers, a union and professional association which later merged with its English language Catholic counterpart, the Provincial Association of Catholic Teachers, to form the Quebec Provincial Association of Teachers.

== Leadership ==
School board members were originally appointed, but this gave way to elections, originally restricted to property owners.
