= Wagar High School =

High school in Quebec, Canada

Coordinates: 45°28′10″N 73°40′7″W

Wagar High School was a high school at 5785 Parkhaven Avenue in Côte Saint-Luc, Quebec, Canada. It opened its doors in 1963 as part of the Protestant School Board of Greater Montreal (PSBGM) and closed in 2005 as part of the English Montreal School Board (EMSB). At its peak in the mid-70s, Wagar's population topped out at over 1,700 students, despite its having been built to accommodate 1,100. The school was named after Roy Wagar, a school board official. Its first graduating class was in 1965. Wagar died during his speech at Monklands High School's graduation ceremony just a year before Wagar High School opened its doors.

Over many years, particularly in the 70s, Wagar High School enjoyed a reputation for high academic achievement, consistently scoring at the top of the provincial rankings, and regularly eclipsing teams from rival high schools such as West Hill, Mount Royal, Loyola, Father MacDonald and others, in the CBC Television quiz show "Reach For The Top".

After years of declining enrollment, Wagar High School was closed in 2005. The Wagar building was renamed The Giovanni Palatucci Facility on May 16, 2006, after a World War II hero who risked and eventually gave his life to save 5000 Jews. This was especially fitting because of the large percentage of Jewish students at Wagar during most of its history.

The school board is attempting to reopen the high school for the 2011–12 school year, as a sports specialty school.

The building was reopened as John Grant High School.

== Notable alumni ==
- Janet Perlman (born 1954, attended 9th and 10th grades) animator and children's book author.
- Steven Pinker (born 1954, class of 1971) Harvard College experimental psychologist, cognitive scientist, linguist and popular science author.
- Brian Barsky (class of 1971) University of California, Berkeley computer scientist, vision scientist, professor
- Zindel Segal (born 1956, class of 1973) cognitive psychologist, professor
- Victoria Kaspi (born 1967, class of 1984) McGill University, astrophysicist, neutron stars, pulsar researcher
