= Cojo =

Cojo may refer to:

cojocaru andrei

== People ==
- Steven Cojocaru, fashion critic
- Cody Johnson, American country music performer

== Organizations ==
- C.O.J.O. - The World Conference of Jewish Organizations
