= Liz Silcott =

Canadian basketball player (born 1950)

Personal information
- Born: 14 December 1950 (age 75)
- Listed height: 5 ft 6 in (1.68 m)

Career information
- High school: Northmount (Montreal, Canada)
- College: UBC (1972–1974); Loyola of Montreal (1974–1975); Concordia (1976–1977); Waterloo (1978–1979)
- Position: Guard
- Number: 55

Career history
- 1979–1980: St. Louis Streak
- 1980: San Francisco Pioneers
- 1980: New Mexico Energee

Career highlights
- CWIAU champion (1974, 1975); WBL All-Star (1980)
- Stats at Basketball Reference

Elizabeth Silcott (born 14 December 1950) is a Canadian former basketball player. Known as Liz the Whiz, she played professionally in the United States in the Women's Professional Basketball League (WBL) where she averaged 30.2 points for the St. Louis Streak and the San Francisco Pioneers. On 19 December 1979, she scored 50 points in a victory against the Minnesota Fillies. She later played for the New Mexico Energee in the short lived Ladies Professional Basketball Association.

Silcott was inducted into the Canadian Basketball Hall of Fame in 2023.
