= Rhian Wilkinson =

Canadian soccer coach and player (born 1982)

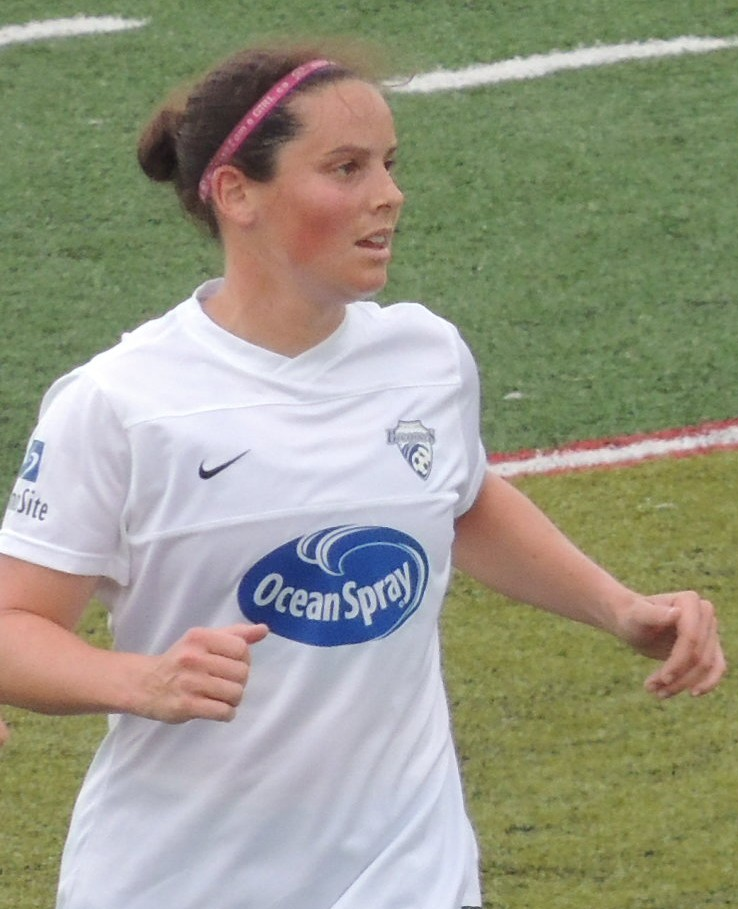
- Wilkinson in 2013

Personal information
- Full name: Rhian Emilie Wilkinson
- Date of birth: May 12, 1982 (age 44)
- Place of birth: Pointe-Claire, Quebec, Canada
- Height: 1.66 m (5 ft 5 in)
- Position: Defender

Youth career
- 1997–1999: Quebec provincial team
- 1997–1998: Lakers Lac St. Louis

College career
Years	Team	Apps	(Gls)
2000–2002	Tennessee Lady Volunteers		

Senior career*
Years	Team	Apps	(Gls)
2003–2005	Ottawa Fury	38	(13)
2005–2012	Team Strømmen	71	(10)
2009	→ Western Mass Pioneers (loan)	1	(0)
2010–2011	→ Surrey United (loan)	10	(1)
2013	Boston Breakers	14	(2)
2014	Laval Comets	4	(0)
2015	Portland Thorns	1	(0)
Total		139	(26)

International career
2003–2017	Canada	181	(7)

Managerial career
- Tennessee Volunteers (volunteer assistant)
- 2017–2018: Canada U-17
- 2019–2020: Canada U-20
- 2019–2020: Canada (assistant)
- 2021: England (assistant)
- 2021: Great Britain (assistant)
- 2022: Portland Thorns
- 2024–: Wales
Medal record
Women's soccer
Representing Canada
Olympic Games
Bronze medal – third place	2012 London	Team
Bronze medal – third place	2016 Rio de Janeiro	Team
Pan American Games
Gold medal – first place	2011 Guadalajara	Team
Silver medal – second place	2003 Santo Domingo	Team
Bronze medal – third place	2007 Rio de Janeiro	Team
- * Club domestic league appearances and goals as of February 14, 2016

Rhian Emilie Wilkinson (born May 12, 1982) is a Canadian professional soccer coach and former player who is the head coach of the Wales women's national team. She was previously the head coach of Portland Thorns of the National Women's Soccer League (NWSL), where she led the team to the 2022 NWSL Championship.

As a player, Wilkinson made over 180 appearances for the Canadian national team and won Olympic bronze medals in 2012 and 2016. She played as a forward and a midfielder at the club level, but was primarily an attacking right fullback for the national team.

== Early life ==
Wilkinson was born in Pointe-Claire, Quebec, to British parents Keith Wilkinson and Shan Evans. Her Danish-born English father was a player with (3 caps in the 1970s) and director of the Canada national rugby union team. Her mother, Shan Evans, was born in Wales. She has an older brother, David, and a twin sister named Sara.

In 1990, she relocated to Wales for one year, where she attended Bont Faen Primary School in Cowbridge. The school did not offer soccer to girls and Wilkinson's mother joined the Parent-Teacher Association to convince the school to have inclusive sports teams.

She attended Villa Maria High School in Montreal and was valedictorian of her class. She played soccer for the Quebec provincial team from 1997 to 1999 and was named most valuable player in 1999 after helping the club to the silver medal at the nationals. In 1997 and 1998, she helped the Lac St. Louis Lakers earn two silver medals at the national club championships. She was selected as the Greater Montreal Athletic Association's Most Valuable Soccer Player in 2000, and attended the national training centre camp for the under-19 Canadian national team in 2001. Wilkinson competed for the Lakeshore, a female ice hockey team, and also played rugby from 1998 to 1999.

Wilkinson majored in speech communication and English at the University of Tennessee and was chosen as the University of Tennessee's Lady Vols' Offensive Most Valuable Player in 2002.

== Club career ==
Wilkinson was named to the 2003 W-League All Star team and the 2004 W-League Championship All-Tournament team. She won the W-League 2005 scoring championship and tied for the assist leader with 38 points on 13 goals and 12 assists.

She began playing for Team Strømmen of the Toppserien (Norwegian league) in autumn 2005 and maintained her relationship with the club over the course of eight seasons.

In 2013, she played for the Boston Breakers in the new National Women's Soccer League. She played several games for Boston as a midfielder, scoring twice.

She signed with the Laval Comets of the W-League in 2014.

In 2015, Wilkinson joined Portland Thorns FC of the National Women's Soccer League through NWSL Player Allocation. In February 2016, the Thorns announced that Wilkinson would not play for the team in 2016, and she became unaffiliated.

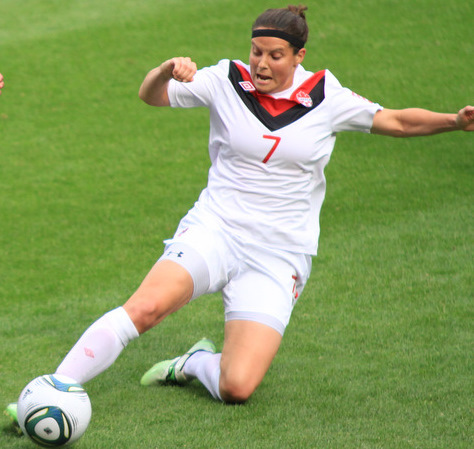
Rhian Wilkinson playing for Canada, 2011

== International career ==
Wilkinson won bronze with Canada at the 2007 Pan American Games, and gold at the 2011 Pan American Games where Canada defeated Brazil 4–3 in penalty kicks. She captured an Olympic bronze medal at London 2012 after Canada defeated France 1–0 on August 9, 2012, in Coventry, England. She contributed three assists in the first two games for Canada at the 2014 Cyprus Cup. Wilkinson announced her retirement from international soccer on January 13, 2017.

== International goals ==
No.	Date	Venue	Opponent	Score	Result	Competition
1.	17 July 2003	Molson Stadium, Montreal, Canada	Brazil	1–?	2–1	Friendly
2.	9 September 2003	Swangard Stadium, Burnaby, Canada	Mexico	5–0	6–0	Friendly
3.	14 September 2003	Richardson Memorial Stadium, Kingston, Canada	Australia	2–0	2–0	Friendly
4.	1 November 2006	Changwon Civil Stadium, Changwon, South Korea	Brazil	4–1	4–2	2006 Peace Queen Cup
5.	22 November 2006	The Home Depot Center, Carson, United States	Jamaica	2–0	4–0	2006 CONCACAF Women's Gold Cup
6.	12 May 2007	Pizza Hut Park, Frisco, United States	United States	1–1	2–6	Friendly
7.	18 July 2007	Centro de Futebol Zico, Rio de Janeiro, Brazil	Jamaica	5–0	11–1	2007 Pan American Games

== Coaching career ==
Wilkinson was a volunteer assistant coach at her alma mater Tennessee Volunteers. She also served as an assistant coach for the Canadian women's national team in 2019 and 2020, while leading their under-20 and under-17 programs.

In February 2021, Wilkinson was appointed as assistant manager of the England women's national team with Hege Riise in charge. Riise and Wilkinson also coached the Great Britain women's Olympic team in 2021.

In November 2021, Wilkinson was named head coach of Portland Thorns FC of the National Women's Soccer League (NWSL). She led the team to a second-place finish in the regular season, followed by winning the 2022 NWSL Championship 2–0 over the Kansas City Current. Despite the on-field success, Wilkinson chose to resign. She and a player had self reported to HR an interest in a relationship. A review concluded that Wilkinson did not violate any team or league policies, and no legal wrongdoing or misconduct had occurred, yet she chose to leave the team stating she felt she may have lost the team's confidence. Wilkinson left her role in December 2022. That player, Emily Menges, and Wilkinson are now married.

Wilkinson was named as head coach of Wales in February 2024. Wilkinson was at the helm as Wales qualified for their first major tournament in the women's game when they defeated Ireland 2-1 on December 3, 2024, with the team qualifying for the UEFA Women's Euro 2025.

Having entered Euro 2025 as the lowest-ranked team in the tournament, under Wilkinson's coaching Wales exited in the group stage following three defeats but received praise for their performance with limited resources, with the Minister for Culture, Skills and Social Partnership, Jack Sargeant, saying "Qualifying for a first major women's tournament is an incredible feat by this fantastic group of players. I am incredibly proud of all the team has achieved". On May 22, 2026, it was announced that Wilkinson had signed a new contract to extend her time as Wales' head coach.

== Personal life ==
Wilkinson plays the cello for fun and played the trumpet in high school, and has been a member of the Suzuki Strings Orchestra since 1994. She participated in the 1997 Quebec Winter Games in ringette.

Wilkinson married former teammate Emily Menges on January 1, 2025. Their daughter, Rowan, was born on February 7, 2026.

== Managerial statistics ==
As of 9 October 2026

Team	From	To	Record				
Team	From	To	G	W	D	L	Win %
Portland Thorns FC	November 29 2021	December 2 2022	30	15	10	5	50.00
Wales	February 28 2024	Present	31	13	8	10	41.94
Total			61	28	18	15	45.90

== Honours ==
=== Playing ===
==== Canada ====
- Summer Olympic Games: bronze medal: 2012, 2016
- Pan American Games: 2011

==== Individual ====
- Canada Soccer Hall of Fame: 2022
- "Maurice" Award: 2008
- Canada Soccer Fans' Choice Award: 2007
- Senior Excellence Women Player: 2007
- Southeastern Conference (SEC) Freshman of the Year: 2000

=== Coaching ===
Portland Thorns FC

- NWSL Championship: 2022

== See also ==
- List of women's footballers with 100 or more international caps
