= Greater Montreal Athletics Association =

The Greater Montreal Athletics Association (GMAA) is an inter-mural sporting league in the Greater Montreal Area. It arranges inter-school sports events.

== Fall Division 1 Championships ==
=== Boys Touch Football ===
Year	Juvenile	Bantam
2005	James Lyng	
2006	Lasalle Community	
2007	Pierrefonds	
2008	Beurling	
2009	Beurling	
2010	Pierrefonds	
2011	Beurling	
2012	Lindsay Place	Royal West
2013	Howard S. Billings	Beurling
2014	Pierrefonds	

=== Golf ===
Year	Boys	Girls
2005	Lower Canada	Sacred Heart
2006	John Rennie	Queen of Angels
2007	Kuper	Queen of Angels
2008	Loyola	Trafalgar
2009		
2010		
2011	Kuper	Saint Thomas
2012	Kuper	Westwood
2013	Loyola	Queen of Angles
2014	Bialik & John Rennie (tie)	Kuper

=== Soccer ===
Year	Juvenile Boys	Midget Boys	Bantam Boys	Juvenile Girls	Midget Girls	Bantam Girls
2005	Lower Canada	Loyola	John Paul I	Sacred Heart	The Study	John Paul I
2006	Loyola	Lasalle Community	Mother Teresa	Sacred Heart	Saint Thomas	Vincent Massey
2007	Vincent Massey	Saint Thomas	Loyola	Laurier MacDonald	Lake of Two Mountains	Lasalle Community
2008	Loyola	Loyola	John Paul I	Rosemount	Vincent Massey	Vincent Massey
2009	Loyola	Lasalle Community	John Paul I	Westwood	Vincent Massey	Pierrefonds
2010	Pierrefonds	Vincent Massey	Pierrefonds	Vincent Massey	Laval Liberty	Vincent Massey
2011	Pierrefonds	Laval Liberty	John Paul I	Laurier Senior	Pierrefonds	Vincent Massey
2012	Laurier MacDonald	Loyola	Mother Teresa	John Rennie	Kuper	Saint Thomas
2013	Loyola	Lester B. Pearson	Rosemere	Pierrefonds	Vincent Massey	Sainte Anne
2014	Laurier MacDonald	Lester B. Pearson	Loyola	Saint Thomas	Sainte Anne	Sainte Anne

=== Volleyball ===
Year	Juvenile Boys	Midget Boys	Bantam Boys	Juvenile Girls	Midget Girls	Bantam Girls
2005	Loyola	Loyola	Loyola	Royal West	Trafalgar	Sacred Heart
2006	Loyola	Loyola	Loyola	Trafalgar	Sacred Heart	Miss Edgar & Cramps'
2007	Lindsay Place	Loyola	Loyola	Sacred Heart	Royal West	Villa Maria
2008	Loyola	Loyola	Loyola	Royal West	Villa Maria	Villa Maria
2009	Laurier MacDonald	Loyola	Loyola	Royal West	Miss Edgars & Cramps'	Miss Edgar & Cramps'
2010	Royal West	Loyola	Loyola	Royal West	Villa Maria	Sacred Heart
2011	Loyola	Laurier MacDonald	Loyola	Royal West	Sacred Heart	Westwood
2012	John Rennie	Loyola	Loyola	Miss Edgars & Cramps'	Westwood	Westwood
2013	Loyola	Lindsay Place	Loyola	Lower Canada	Westwood	Westwood
2014	Royal West	Loyola	Loyola	Westwood	Royal West	Villa Maria

== Winter Division 1 Championships ==
=== Basketball ===
Year	Juvenile Boys	Midget Boys	Bantam Boys	Juvenile Girls	Midget Girls	Bantam Girls
2006	LaurenHill	LaurenHill	Marymount	Villa Maria	Lower Canada	West Island
2007	Lindsay Place	LaurenHill	LaurenHill	Lower Canada	Riverdale	John Rennie
2008	LaurenHill	John Rennie	LaurenHill	John Rennie	West Island	Saint Thomas
2009	John Rennie	LaurenHill	John Rennie	Lower Canada	Saint Thomas	John Rennie
2010	Lower Canada	Riverdale	Howard S. Billings	Lindsay Place	Saint Thomas	John Rennie
2011						
2012	John Rennie	John Rennie	LaurenHill	Saint Thomas	Bialik	Saint Thomas
2013	John Rennie	Riverdale	Westmount	Saint Thomas	John Rennie	Villa Maria
2014	Marymount	Riverdale	Bialik	John Rennie	LaurenHill	Villa Maria

=== Hockey ===
Year	Juvenile Boys	Bantam Boys	Peewee Boys	Juvenile Girls
2006	Loyola	Jean Eudes	Lower Canada	Kuper
2007	Lower Canada	Selwyn	Loyola	Kuper
2008	Lower Canada	Lower Canada	Vincent Massey	Kuper
2009	Saint Thomas	Selwyn	John Rennie	Sainte Therese
2010	Kuper	Lester B. Pearson	John Rennie	Kuper
2011	Loyola	Loyola		
2012	Kuper	John Rennie	Vincent Massey	
2013	Lower Canada	Kuper	Vincent Massey	
2014	Kuper	Loyola	Loyola	Kuper
2015	Kuper	Loyola	Lester B. Pearson	Saint Thomas

=== Indoor Track & Field ===
Year	Boys 16-18	Boys 14-15	Boys 11-13	Girls 16-18	Girls 14-15	Girls 11-13
2008	Pierrefonds	Centennial	Beurling	Villa Maria	Lester B. Pearson	Lester B. Pearson
2009	Lasalle	Centennial	Lindsay Place	LaurenHill	Royal West	Saint Thomas
2010	Lindsay Place	Pierrefonds	Lasalle	Beurling	Lasalle	Lindsay Place
2011						
2012	Beurling	LaurenHill	John Paul I	Lindsay Place	Lower Canada	Royal West
2013	Howard S. Billings	Saint Thomas	Beaconsfield	Lower Canada	Howard S. Billings	Howard S. Billings
2014	Pierrefonds	LaurenHill	Lower Canada	Howard S. Billings	Royal West	Lower Canada

=== Wrestling ===
Year	Boys	Girls
2006	Kahnawake Survival	
2007	Selwyn	Beurling
2008	Kahnawake Survival	Kahnawake Survival
2009	Kahnawake Survival	
2010	Kahnawake Survival	
2011		
2012	Selwyn	Kahnawake Survival
2013	Loyola	Kahnawake Survival
2014	Beurling	Kahnawake Survival
2015	Beurling	Vincent Massey

== Spring Division 1 Championships ==
=== Rugby ===
Year	Juvenile Boys	Midget Boys	Bantam Boys	Juvenile Girls	Midget Girls
2006	Loyola	West Island	Saint Thomas	Chateaurguay Valley	Saint Thomas
2007	Chateauguay Valley	Saint Thomas	Saint Thomas	Lower Canada	Chateauguay Valley
2008	Lower Canada	Saint Thomas	Saint Thomas	Saint Thomas	
2009	Lower Canada	Saint Thomas	Selwyn	Chateauguay Valley	Chateauguay Valley
2010	Saint Thomas	Loyola	Loyola	Chateauguay Valley	Saint Thomas
2011	Selwyn	Loyola	Loyola	Saint Thomas	Westwood
2012	Selwyn	Loyola	Selwyn	Chateauguay Valley	
2013	Loyola	Loyola	Loyola	Saint Thomas	Chateauguay Valley
2014	Loyola	Loyola	Lasalle Community	Howard S. Billings	Westwood

== See also ==
- Canadian Interuniversity Sport
