= Garbage Bowl =

The Garbage Bowl was a yearly Canadian football matchup that took on January 1 each year in Montreal West, Quebec, Canada. Overseen by the Montreal West Garbage Bowl Association, the matches took place annually from 1950 to 2009 on the Royal West Academy football field.

The match took place between two teams: the Northern Combines and the Southern Bombers. The players volunteered their time and effort to raise donations. Historically, the Northern Combines were made up of Montreal West residents living North of the CPR Crossing whilst the Southern Bombers were those living South of it. Many played the game annually upwards of 20 years and players's ages varied considerably from teens to those in their 50's.

Proceeds from the games were donated to children's and youth organizations supported by the Montreal Westward Rotary Club.

In November 2009, it was announced that the event had ended. https://montrealgazette.com/news/local-news/tradition-canned-montreal-west-garbage-bowl-is-no-more
