= Westmount High School =

Public high school in Quebec, Canada

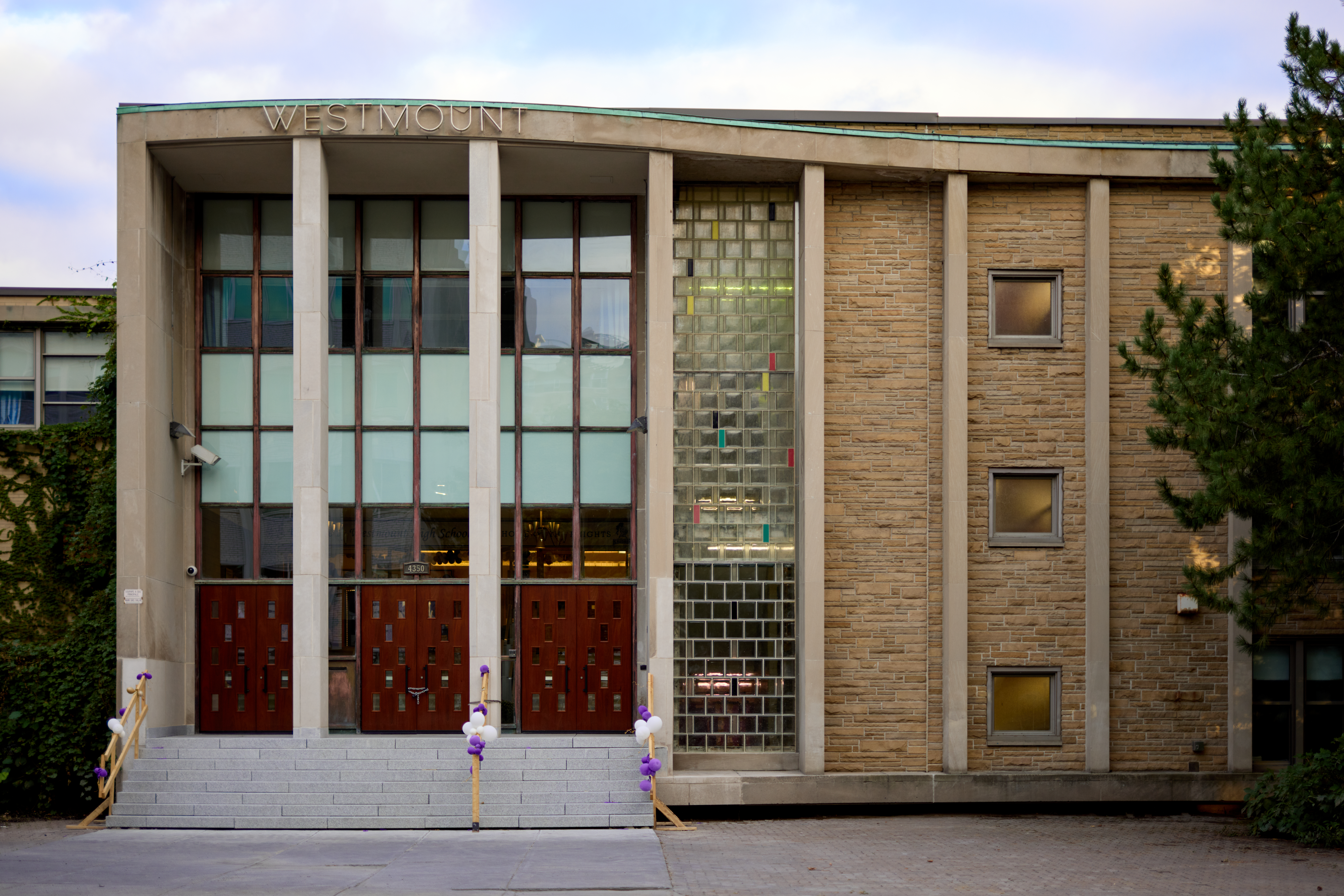

Location
- 4350 St. Catherine St. West; Westmount, Quebec; Canada; 45.4833°N 73.5900°W

Information
- School type: Advanced Placement, Public
- Motto: dux vitæ ratio (reason is the guide of life)
- Founded: 1873; 153 years ago
- School board: English Montreal School Board
- Principal: Luigi Santamaria
- Grades: 7–11
- Enrollment: 902 (2017)
- Language: English
- Area: Westmount
- Colours: Purple; White
- Mascot: Knight
- Team name: Westmount Knights
- Website: westmount.emsb.qc.ca/whs
- Last updated: July 12, 2024; 2 years ago

Logo

Westmount High School (French: École secondaire Westmount) is a public co-educational anglophone secondary school in Westmount, Quebec, Canada, located near the Alexis Nihon Complex Shopping Mall. It is a part of the English Montreal School Board (EMSB).

Westmount High is Quebec's first and only public school to offer Advanced Placement (AP) courses; it has offered an AP program since 2003. They offer AP Calculus, AP Comparative Government and Politics, AP English Literature and Composition, AP Environmental Science, AP French Language and Culture, and AP Psychology.

The school moved to its present location in 1961, after selling their former building to Selwyn House School.

Westmount is part of the English Montreal School Board and was formerly part of the Protestant School Board of Greater Montreal.

Despite being located in one of the wealthiest suburbs of Montreal, its catchment area includes a diverse mix of students from all neighbourhoods and racial backgrounds. A long-time teacher at the school noted that most wealthy families would send their children to private schools, so the school received mostly students from disadvantaged backgrounds.

Around January 2020, Westmount High School created "The Westmount Highlights", a students and vice-principal YouTube channel initiative, to provide students with weekly school news, fun facts, and entertainment.

== Notable alumni ==
- Mona Elaine Adilman, poet
- George Alevisatos, CFL player
- Hudson Trevor Allison, survivor of the Titanic disaster
- Jesse Camacho, actor
- John E. Cleghorn, banker, chancellor of Wilfrid Laurier University
- Leonard Cohen, poet, musician, writer
- Stockwell Day, Canadian politician (provincial and federal), former leader of the Canadian Alliance
- Vibert Douglas, astrophysicist
- Rebecca Elson, astronomer and poet
- Kamala Harris, former Vice President of the United States
- Maya Harris, lawyer and sister of Kamala Harris
- Jeremy Howick, Oxford philosopher and medical researcher
- Jeffrey Khaner, Principal Flutist, Philadelphia Orchestra, Flute Professor Juilliard School and Curtis Institute
- Mary Jane Lamond, folk musician
- David H. Levy, astronomer, discoverer of 22 comets
- MJ Long, first in class 1956, British architect, OBE, Yale professor.
- Colin McGregor, infamous crossbow murderer in 1991.
- Mila Mulroney, wife of former Prime Minister of Canada Brian Mulroney
- Alfred Powis, businessman
- Johnny Peirson, professional ice hockey player and colour commentator
- Joanna Pettet, actress
- Art Ross, professional ice hockey player and executive early 20th century
- Claire Holden Rothman, novelist
- Marla Rubin, stage producer
- Moshe Safdie, class of '55, architect (famous for Montreal's Expo 67's "Habitat 67" apartment complex)
- Norma Shearer, actress
- A. J. M. Smith, poet
- Edgar William Richard Steacie, chemist, president 1952-62 of the National Research Council of Canada
- Helene Udy, actress
- Caroline Vu, novelist and medical doctor
- Gordon Wasserman, class of '55 Rhodes Scholar Oxford University, appointed member of the UK House of Lords, 2011
- Trevor C. Williams, retired basketball player, Dawson Division 1 Women's Coach
- Wayne Yearwood, retired basketball player, Dawson Men's Division 1 coach
