= École Arménienne Sourp Hagop =

L'École arménienne Sourp Hagop Սուրբ Յակոբ Ազգային Վարժարան

- École Arménienne Sourp Hagop

Location
- 3400, rue Nadon; Montreal, Quebec, H4J 1P5; Canada; 45°31′53.75″N 73°41′45.28″W

Information
- Type: Semi-private
- Established: 1974
- Founder: Yervant Pasdermajian
- Principal: Lory Abrakian
- Grades: Kindergarten - 11th
- Enrollment: Roughly 800 (2021-2022)
- Language: French, Armenian, English
- Hours in school day: 8
- Colors: Blue, White
- Slogan: Toujours plus haut, toujours plus loin
- Religious Affiliation: Armenian Apostolic (Orthodox)
- Website: sourphagop.com

L'École arménienne Sourp Hagop (Saint James's Armenian School) is a college preparatory semi-private secondary school located in Montreal, Quebec, Canada. The Armenian-Canadian school has around 800 students, excluding the children in the nearby, closely affiliated pre-school. Education begins in Kindergarten and ends at Secondary 5, after which graduating students continue their education at a CÉGEP. The current director is Lory Abrakian. According to a study made by the Fraser Institute in 2005, L'École arménienne Sourp Hagop ranked 10th amongst best secondary schools in Quebec with Miss Edgar's and Miss Cramp's School being first. It is the largest Armenian school outside of Armenia, surpassing even the Armenian schools in Lebanon and Syria.

The school, which has a student body composed entirely from the Armenian community, teaches in French with English as a second language and also offers Armenian heritage classes. The Ministry of Education for Quebec provides a partial subsidy for the school.

Its components are École primaire V. et A. Sarafian and École secondaire Pasdermajian.

== History ==
=== Foundation ===
The foundation of an Armenian school and church in Montréal was initiated by an executive committee presided by Yervant Pasdermadjian. Armenian education was laid when an Armenian Saturday school opened its doors in 1959. Later, in September 1973, the Armenian Relief Society opened a pre-school for Armenian youngsters from two to five years old. In 1974, the Sourp Hagop Armenian School was founded on Parthenais Street, starting with 37 pupils from kindergarten to first grade.

The prelacy of the Sourp Hagop Armenian Church established an executive committee in order to fulfill the educational needs of the growing Armenian community of both Laval and Montreal. The ARS pre-school now had to prepare the children for future education. The number of preschoolers of the ARS pre-school augmented, and went from 60 to 160.

=== Development ===
In 1975, the school moved to a new building on Victor Doré Street. The school grew each year, first by becoming a primary school, and later on, by obtaining the authorization of opening its secondary classes.

In 1987, Sourp Hagop moved to the former Malcolm Campbell High School, a much larger building that was part of the English language public school system. The building is located next to the Sourp Hagop Armenian Church. The school had to develop progressively, in order to reach its current size of more than 800 students.

The Armenian Relief Society has given a substantial amount support to the school. In fact, the school's library and computer lab have grown extensively thanks to the ARS's efforts.

=== Education ===
L'École Arménienne Sourp Hagop is a French school, and most of the classes are instructed in French such as mathematics, science and Canadian-Quebec history. However, some classes such as Armenian language and literature are taught in Armenian. Armenian literature and history are taught so that the Armenian cultural identity is preserved in the newer generations of the Armenian Canadian community. English language and literature are taught in addition to Armenian and French.

In 1978, 80% of the teaching was to be in French, with Armenian medium and English medium instruction taking up 10% each.

Extracurricular activities, such as art, athletics, chess and music are encouraged. In January 2018 the first Geogra-bee contest took place.
