= MIND High School =

Location
- 4563 Saint-Urbain street Montreal, Quebec, H2T 2V9; Canada; 45.5192°N 73.5878°W

Information
- School type: Alternative high school
- Founded: 1975
- School board: English Montreal School Board
- Principal: Dorothy Ostrovich
- Staff: 7
- Grades: 9–11
- Enrollment: ~55
- Language: English
- Area: The Plateau
- Public transit: Mount Royal; 11, 97
- Website: www.mindhighschool.com

MIND High School (Moving In New Directions) (est. 1975) is an alternative education high school in Montreal, Quebec, Canada. Its reputation stems from its community-based programs.

MIND is a partnership between the English Montreal School Board (EMSB) and McGill University's Faculty of Education. The program focuses on providing critical thinking and enriched education through alternative teaching methods.

== History ==
Founded in 1975 with 125 students from the entire PSBGM (Protestant School Board of Greater Montreal) and 7 staff, MIND was originally known simply as "The Alternative High School" and was located primarily on the third floor (with a few classes on the second floor) of the International YMCA at the corner of Parc Avenue and St. Viateur.

A vote was held by the community (students, staff and parents/guardians each had one vote), and "M.I.N.D." (Moving In New Directions) was declared the new name of the school. Early community votes dealt with the use of recreational drugs at school (rejected), smoking during class (eventually banned on the third floor only), world poverty and debt (no resolution) and student apathy (a surprisingly large meeting with no real solution). Community meetings were held weekly and home group meetings were held every Monday morning.

Shortly after, MIND moved to the third floor of the old High School of Montreal building on University Street, which was otherwise occupied by the arts-oriented high school F.A.C.E. Staff consisted of eight teachers including one head teacher, and approximately 133 students in grades 9-11 (secondary III-V). MIND currently has five teachers and 55 students.

In 1999, MIND moved to its current location on the top floor of the Bancroft elementary school building on Saint-Urbain Street near Mont-Royal Avenue. In 2003, MIND organized its first soccer team, and was soundly trounced by all of its competitors. The team's uniforms were black and white, with no logo.
