= Malcolm Campbell High School =

- The school building circa 2007, now occupied by L'École Arménienne Sourp Hagop.

Location
- 3400 Nadon Street; Montreal, Quebec; Canada; 45°31′53.75″N 73°41′45.28″W

Information
- Established: c. 1961
- Closed: c. 1987
- School board: Protestant School Board of Greater Montreal

Malcolm Campbell High School was a high school in Montreal operated by the Protestant School Board of Greater Montreal and named after Malcolm A. Campbell, a Presbyterian minister who served as chairman of the school board for many years.

It opened September 1960. The board voted in December 1986 to close the school.

The building is now occupied by L'École Arménienne Sourp Hagop, a private school.
