= Steven Cojocaru =

Canadian television fashion critic

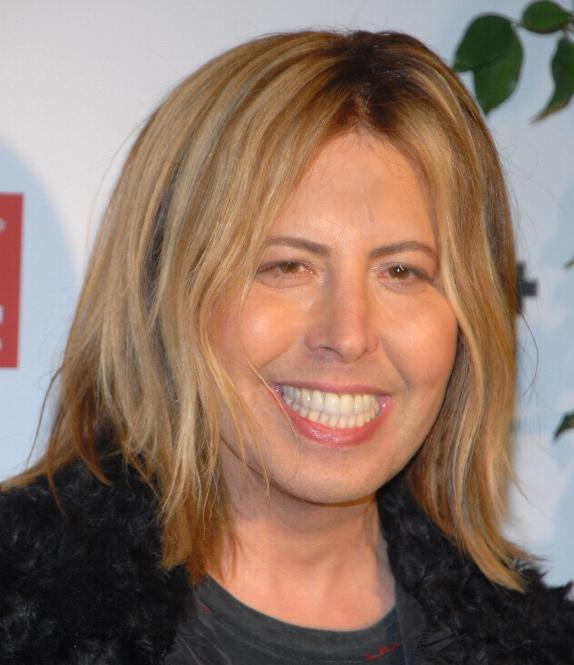
- Steven Cojocaru in 2007
- Born: July 4, 1962 (age 64); Montreal, Quebec
- Other name: Cojo
- Education: Wagar High School, Concordia University
- Known for: Fashion critic
- Parent(s): Ben Cojocaru; Amelia Cojocaru

Steven Cojocaru (/ˈkoʊdʒoʊkɑːruː/; Romanian pronunciation: [koʒoˈkaru]; born July 4, 1962), is a Canadian television fashion critic. He was born in Montreal, Quebec to Romanian parents. Cojocaru started out as a magazine columnist and eventually began working on American television shows as a correspondent and interviewer, working on Entertainment Tonight, The Today Show, The Insider and Access Hollywood.

== Career ==
Cojocaru earned a Bachelor's Degree in Communications from Concordia University. He began working in 1995 for the Canadian fashion magazine Flare. After moving to Hollywood, he began writing a column. He was People Magazine's West Coast fashion editor. He has written two autobiographies, Red Carpet Diaries: Confessions of a Glamour Boy (2003) and Glamour, Interrupted (2008).

In 2003 and 2004, Cojocaru worked on American Idol, helping the contestants select new wardrobe pieces from show sponsor Old Navy. On May 6, 2008, he appeared with John Oliver in a segment for The Daily Show, "Ticket to the Pollies".

== Personal life ==
Cojocaru grew up in the Montreal suburb of Côte-Saint-Luc where he graduated from Wagar High School in 1979.

Cojocaru has had two kidney transplants due to being afflicted by the genetic Polycystic Kidney Disease. The first (donated by his best friend) was removed when it became infected with polyomavirus. The second transplant in 2005, where his mother Amelia gave her kidney, has to date been successful.

Cojocaru is in recovery from alcoholism.

He is openly gay.
