= Michael D. Penner =

Canadian lawyer

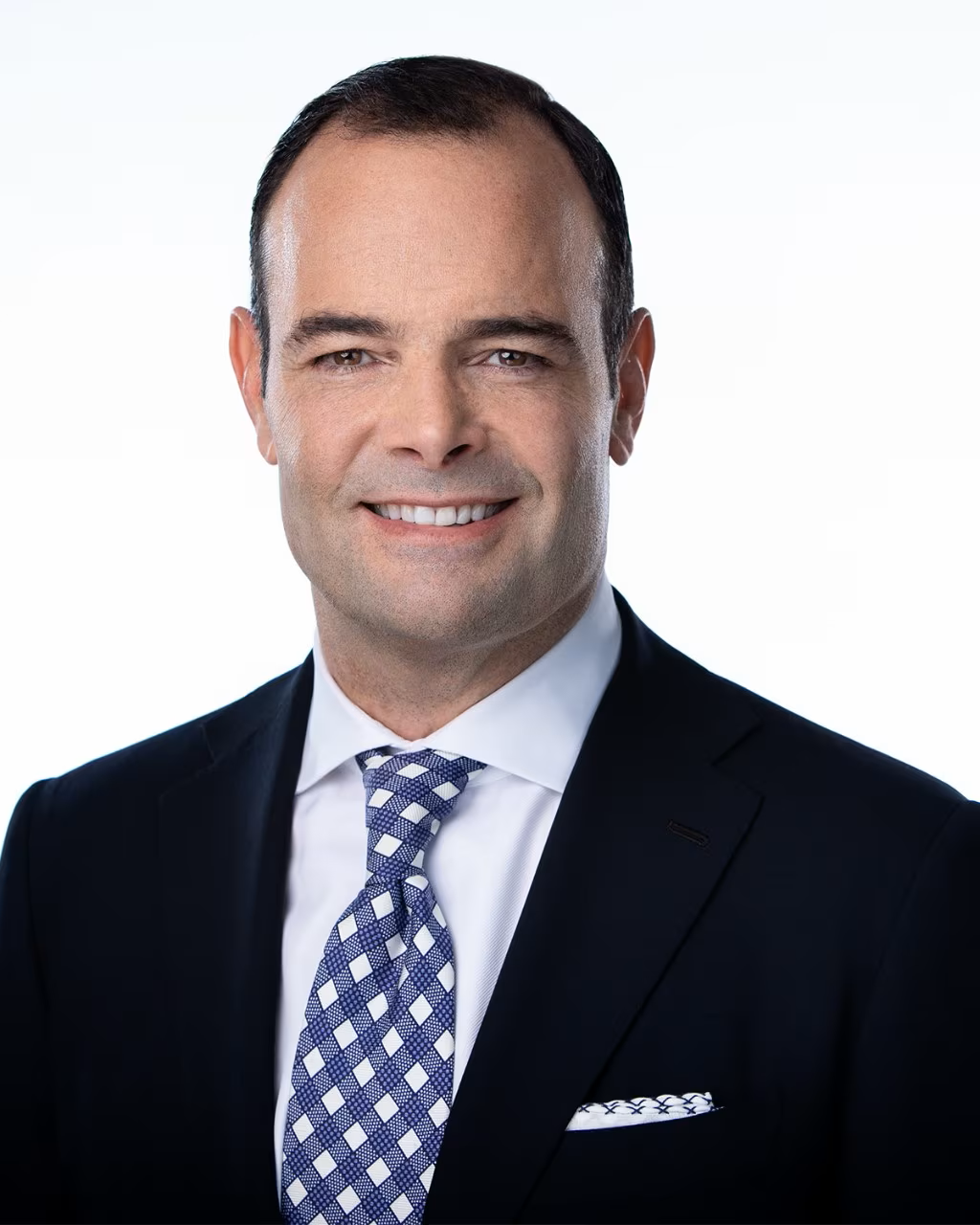
- Born: 1969 (age 56–57)
- Occupations: lawyer businessman
- Known for: former chairman of Hydro-Québec

Michael David Penner (born March 1969) is a Canadian lawyer, businessman and chairman of the board. Born in Montreal, Quebec, he served as chairman of the board of Hydro-Québec from 2014 to 2018.

== Studies and legal career ==
Penner attended elementary school at Roslyn Elementary School and secondary school at Selwyn House School. He received his JD degree from Hofstra University in Long Island, New York after earning an undergraduate degree at McGill University, Montreal, Quebec. He began his career as a lawyer in New York, first with Rivkin Radler & Kremer and then with the Olsten Corporation.

== Business career ==
In 1998, Penner joined Richelieu Group, a company that manufactures and imports legwear, and then acquired the company in 2006. He managed the company through the economic downturn that began in 2008 when many manufacturers began exporting production overseas, and returned the company to profitability. Penner became an advocate of the Made in the USA program, which aimed to bring back manufacturing to the United States. The company expanded into the US in 2011 through the acquisition of certain assets of International Legwear Group (ILG), which included the brands PEDS and MediPEDS. On November 17, 2014, PEDS opened a state-of-the-art manufacturing plant in Hildebran, North Carolina with Governor Pat McCrory in attendance.

U.S. President Barack Obama invited Penner to talk about PEDS' investment at a roundtable discussion at the White House in 2014.

In 2016, Gildan Activewear Inc. purchased PEDS for US$55 million.

Penner was instrumental in establishing the multi-disciplinary “Michael D. Penner Initiative on ESG” at the Universite de Montreal. This initiative serves as a multidisciplinary research hub to study a broad range of environmental, social and governance issues, with focus on bringing academic rigor to an increasingly fierce debate about corporate responsibilities in areas such as climate control and diversity.

He currently serves on the board of directors of Scotia Bank, the Toronto headquartered financial services company with 88,000 employees serving 23 million customers in over 55 countries worldwide, with a stronghold in Canada and Latin America. In his function as a Lead Operating Director for Partners Group based in Zug Switzerland), Penner serves as the Chairman of the United States Infrastructure Corporation (USIC) and EnfraGen Power. USIC is the largest underground telecommunications, power and water utility line locating and damage prevention company in North America. EnfraGen is a leading developer, owner and operator of renewable power generation assets in Chile, Colombia and Panama. EnfraGen's power portfolio includes solar, hydro, and gas generation assets.

== Chairman of the board of Hydro-Québec ==
On October 8, 2014, Quebec Premier Philippe Couillard announced that Penner, who had supported him for the Liberal Party leadership, would replace Pierre Karl Péladeau as Chairman of Hydro-Québec. He was the first anglophone, first Jewish, and youngest person to hold this position. He confirmed that Hydro-Québec would not be privatized. Penner resigned on November 5, 2018, shortly after Couillard was defeated.

== Honors ==
In 2008, Penner was named by Caldwell Partners as one of "Canada’s Top 40 Under 40".
