= George Alevisatos =

Canadian football defensive lineman (1938–2024)

Profile
- Position: Defensive lineman

Personal information
- Born: August 25, 1938; Montreal, Quebec, Canada
- Died: December 30, 2024 (aged 86)
- Listed height: 5 ft 11 in (1.80 m)
- Listed weight: 225 lb (102 kg)

Career information
- High school: Westmount High School
- Junior: Lakeshore Alouette Flyers
- University: Concordia University

Career history
- 1960: Montreal Alouettes
- 1962: Hamilton Tiger-Cats

George Alevisatos (August 25, 1938 – December 30, 2024) was Canadian football defensive lineman who played for the Montreal Alouettes and the Hamilton Tiger-Cats of the Canadian Football League. In 1960 and 1962, Alevisatos played in seven regular season games in the CFL.

Alevisatos died on December 30, 2024, at the age of 86.
