= Adam Gollner =

Canadian writer and musician

Adam Leith Gollner
- Citizenship: Canadian
- Education: Royal West Academy
- Occupations: writer, musician, producer
- Writing career
- Notable works: The Fruit Hunters (2008), The Book of Immortality
- Website: www.adamgollner.com

Adam Leith Gollner is a Canadian writer and musician based in Montreal. He has written two books, and is the former editor of Vice Magazine. Gollner has also played in bands including We Are Molecules, Dessert, and the Hot Pockets.

== Early life ==
Gollner was born and raised in Canada, and went to Royal West Academy.

== Career ==
The Fruit Hunters

Gollner's first book, The Fruit Hunters: A Story of Nature, Adventure, Commerce and Obsession was published by Charles Scribner's Sons in the United States, Doubleday in Canada, and Larousse in Brazil. The book inspired a 2012 documentary film, directed by Yung Chang.

The Book of Immortality

Goller's second book, The Book of Immortality: The Science, Belief, and Magic Behind Living Forever was published by Charles Scribner's Sons in the United States and Doubleday in Canada. The book won the 2013 Mavis Gallant Prize for Non-Fiction.

Editing, writing

Gollner was the editor of Vice magazine, and he has written for The New York Times, Gourmet, The Globe and Mail, Bon Appétit, Good Magazine, V magazine, Maclean's, Orion, Maisonneuve, The Budapest Sun, The Gravy, Ugly Things, En Route and the Saturday Post. His byline is sometimes Adam Gollner, often Adam Leith Gollner, and occasionally Glenda Molar.

Music

Gollner has also played in bands including We Are Molecules, Dessert, and the Hot Pockets. He co-wrote and co-produced, alongside Nick Diamonds of The Unicorns and Islands, and Steven McDonald of Redd Kross, the UNICEF benefit song "Do They Know It's Halloween."

== Bibliography ==
=== Books ===
- The fruit hunters : a story of nature, adventure, commerce and obsession.
- The book of immortality : the science, belief, and magic behind living forever.

=== Essays and reporting ===
- "Original sins". Vanity Fair. 730: 82–89, 131–133. July–August 2021.
