= Northmount High School =

Location
- 6755 Lavoie Street; Montreal, Quebec H3W 2K8; Canada
- Coordinates: 45.49905709951771°N 73.64114167982993°W

Information
- Other name: Shadd Academy
- Established: 1957
- Closed: mid-1990s
- School board: Protestant School Board of Greater Montreal
- Principal: Gwen Lord 1977 – 1988

Northmount High School is a defunct English-language secondary school which was operated by the Protestant School Board of Greater Montreal in the Côte-des-Neiges area of Montreal, Quebec, Canada. It opened in 1957. It was later known as Shadd Academy. In its early years the school was predominantly Jewish, and later predominantly Caribbean.
