= James Lyng High School =

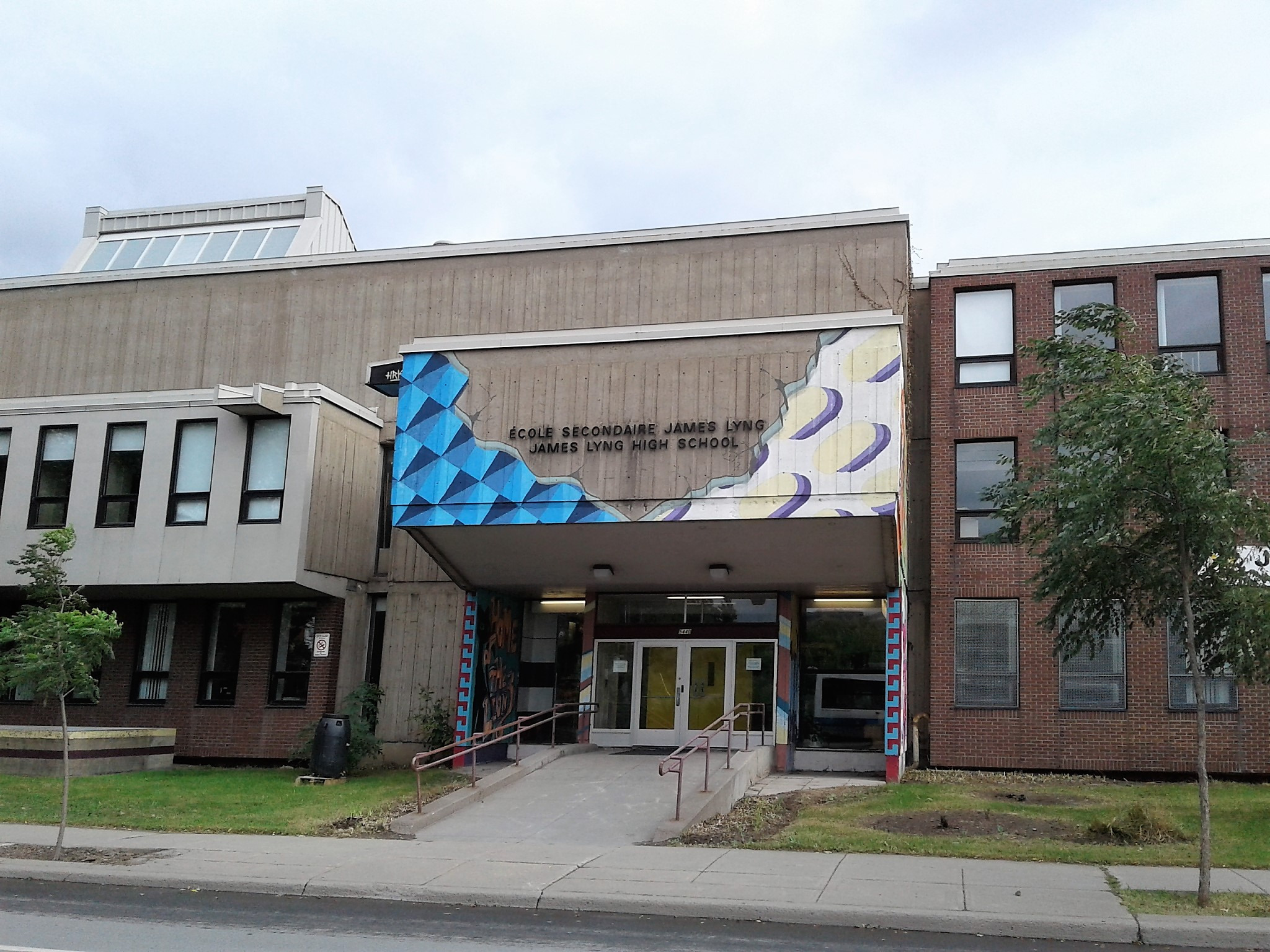
- James Lyng High School

Location
- 5440, rue Notre-Dame Ouest; Montreal, Quebec, H4C 1T9; Canada
- Coordinates: 45.4681°N 73.5957°W

Information
- School type: Public, Secondary School
- School board: English Montreal School Board
- Principal: Alexander Kulczyk
- Grades: 7-11
- Language: English
- Colour: Black
- Website: www.emsb.qc.ca/jameslyng/

James Lyng High School (French: École secondaire James Lyng) is a high school located in Montreal, Quebec, Canada.

It is currently operated by the English Montreal School Board. Before 1998 it was operated by the Montreal Catholic School Commission.

Public Enemy played a concert at the school on November 19, 1988.
