= Commission scolaire Sainte-Croix =

School district in Quebec, Canada

Commission scolaire Sainte-Croix was a Roman Catholic school district headquartered in the Saint-Laurent borough of Montreal, Quebec, Canada.

It was abolished in 1998. Francophone schools became a part of Commission scolaire Marguerite-Bourgeoys while the English Montreal School Board serves Anglophone students.

== Schools ==
Schools were French-language except for two.

Secondary:

- École secondaire Émile-Legault - Saint-Laurent
- Father McDonald High School (English) - Saint-Laurent
- École secondaire Paul-Gérin-Lajoie - Outremont
- École secondaire Pierre-Laporte - Mont-Royal
- École secondaire Saint-Germain de Saint-Laurent - Saint-Laurent

Primary:

- Académie Saint-Clément
- Aquarelle - Saint-Laurent
- Beau séjour - Saint-Laurent
- Bois-franc - Saint-Laurent
- Cardinal-Léger - Saint-Laurent
- Édouard-Laurin - Saint-Laurent
- Enfant-Soleil - Saint-Laurent
- Hébert - Saint-Laurent
- Henri-Beaulieu - Saint-Laurent
- Holy Cross (English) - Saint-Laurent
- Jonathan - Saint-Laurent
- Lajoie - Outremont
- Morand-Nantel - Saint-Laurent
- Nouvelle Querbes - Outremont
- Saint-Clément - Mont-Royal
- Saint-Germain d'Outremont - Outremont
