= Roslyn Elementary School =

Coordinates: 45°28′59″N 73°36′35″W

- Roslyn School Gold logo on Navy background.

Location
- 4699 Westmount Avenue; Westmount, Quebec, H4Y 1X5; Canada

Information
- Former name: Roslyn Avenue School
- School type: Public
- Motto: Private Attention. Public Spirit./Fitter, Smarter and Healthier!
- Founded: 1908
- School board: EMSB
- Principal: Principal Joanna Genovezos (2018- present). Vice Principal Fabiana Ciacciarelli (2024- present)
- Grades: Pre-K – Grade 6/WINGS
- Enrollment: approx. 600 (2024-2025)
- Classes offered: Pre-K, Kindergarten, Grade 1-6, A Special Ed Class (WINGS) An art class and a library
- Language: English and French
- Schedule: 9am to 3:45pm
- Colours: Navy, & White
- Mascot: Rossy
- Website: www.emsb.qc.ca/roslyn/

Roslyn Elementary School, located in Westmount, Quebec, Canada, is a coeducational public school for children between Pre-K and grade Six. The school opened in September 1908 and is currently operated by the English Montreal School Board (EMSB). Roslyn offers bilingual education in English and French; the school introduced its French Immersion Program in 1968, the first on the island of Montreal.

== History ==
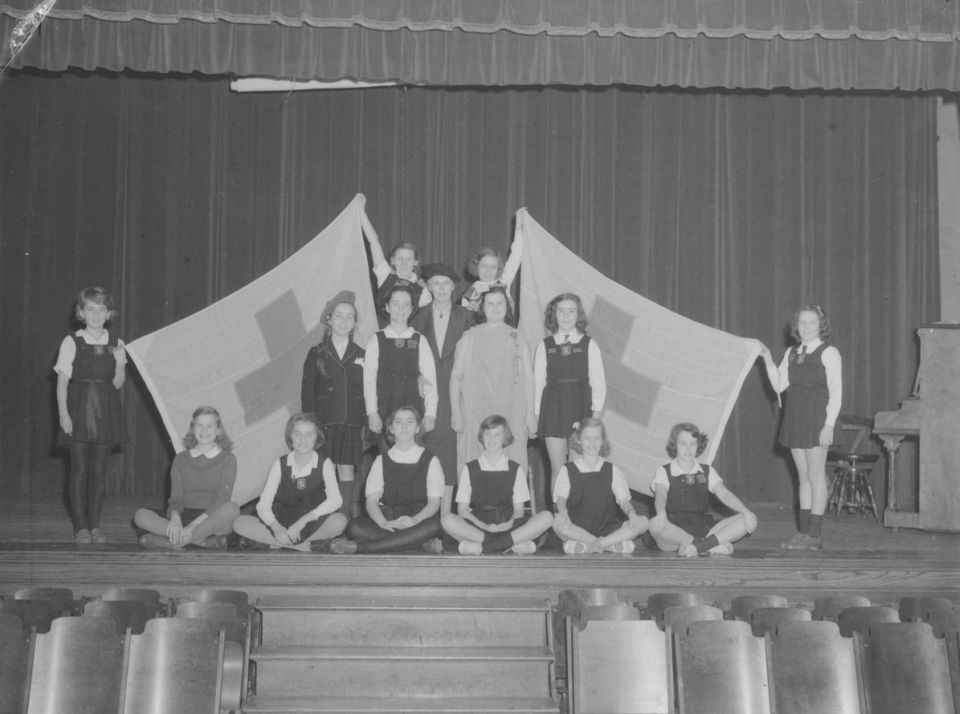
1943 presentation

Roslyn Elementary School was the fourth public elementary school to open in Westmount following Westmount Academy (later Argyle School; built in 1895), King's School (built in 1896), and Queen's School (built in 1900). The cornerstone of Roslyn Elementary School (originally named Roslyn Avenue School) was laid on October 11, 1907.

In September 1908 (the same year the Town of Westmount officially incorporated as the City of Westmount), Roslyn Elementary School opened its doors to 264 students and 10 teachers. Stella Winnifred Alice Young was the school's first principal.

The Roslyn Home and School Association's fund raising initiatives in 1960 were pivotal in the creation of the school's library with the purchase of 375 books.

In 1965, three Roslyn Elementary School parents, Charles Burgess, Carol Kahn, and Joan Rothman, initiated what would become Roslyn's French Immersion Program. It launched in 1968 with the assistance of the Roslyn Home and School Association and then-principal Scott Kneeland.

The school celebrated its 100th anniversary May 30–31, 2008. Centennial events were coordinated by Roslyn School Foundation. A stepping stone pathway featuring the names of donors to the Roslyn School Playground Improvement Fund was unveiled as part of the centennial festivities on October 11, 2007, and a new playground was opened on May 30, 2008.

== Building ==
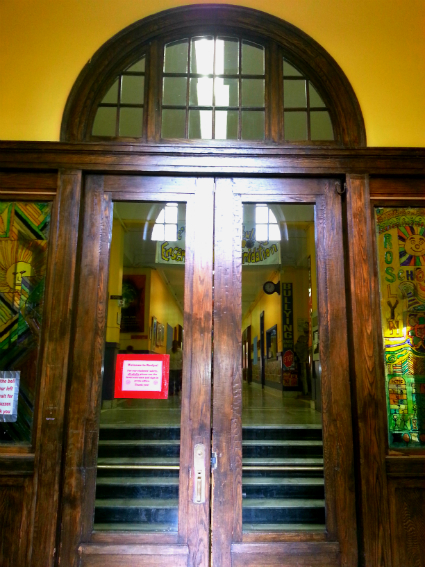
Inside front entrance 2013

Key members from the City of Westmount community who were instrumental in the planning, procurement, design and construction of Roslyn Elementary School included:

- James Kewley Ward – Chairman, Westmount School Commissioners; former Mayor of Village of Notre-Dame-de-Grace (later known as Village of Cote-St. Antoine, subsequently the Town of Westmount until incorporation as the City of Westmount)
- William Gailbraith – Mayor of Westmount
- William Douw Lighthall – Mayor of Westmount (1900-1903)
- Thomas Harling – School Commissioner, procurement of land
- John Stewart – Building contractor
- George Allen Ross – Architect (firm Ross and MacFarlane, later Ross and MacDonald)

== Notable alumni/alumnae ==
- Sylvan Adams – Real estate executive former CEO of Iberville Developments.
- Paul Almond – Television and motion picture screenwriter, director, producer and novelist most noted for his iconic documentary series Seven Up.
- Jay Baruchel – Actor and comedian who has starred in such films as The Sorcerer's Apprentice, How to Train Your Dragon.
- Warren Chippindale – Member of the Order of Canada, fundraising for many institutions including McGill University and the Montreal Neurological Institute.
- Leonard Cohen – Singer-songwriter, musician, poet, novelist and Companion of the Order of Canada.
- David H. Levy – Astronomer and science writer who co-discovered Comet Shoemaker-Levy 9 in 1993, which collided with Jupiter in July 1994.
- Shawn Levy – Canadian-American director, producer, who directed films including Cheaper by the Dozen, The Pink Panther, and Night at the Museum, Real Steel.
- Michael D. Penner – Businessman.
- Norma Shearer – Actress in North America from the mid-1920s through the 1930s.
- A. J. M. Smith – Poet and anthologist.
