= Vincent Massey Collegiate (Montreal) =

Location
- 5925, 27e Avenue; Montreal, Quebec, H1T 3J5; Canada
- Coordinates: 45.5642°N 73.5719°W

Information
- School type: Public, Secondary School
- School board: English Montreal School Board
- Principal: Franca Cristiano
- Grades: 7-11
- Language: English
- Team name: The Rams
- Website: www.vmc.qc.ca

Vincent Massey Collegiate (French: Collège Vincent-Massey) is a high school located in Montreal, Quebec, Canada. It is a part of the English Montreal School Board (EMSB).

== History ==
The building that is now Vincent Massey Collegiate was originally high school built in 1959 by the Montreal Catholic School Commission (CECM) called École secondaire Philippe-Perrier. In 1976, it became an English high school, and the name was changed to Vincent Massey High School. Depending on the years it was used as a junior high school such as in 1978 and 1979 or a senior high school. In 1985, following the closing of Holy Names High School, it became a regular high school with grades 7 to 11.

It was a part of the Catholic School Commission until 1998. In July 1998, school boards were reorganized, and the school came under the jurisdiction on the English Montreal School Board.
