= John Grant High School =

Coordinates: 45°28′10″N 73°40′7″W

Location
- 5785 Parkhaven Avenue; Côte Saint-Luc, Quebec, H4W 1X8; Canada

Information
- School type: Public, High School
- School board: English Montreal School Board
- Principal: Jennifer LeHuquet
- Language: English
- Website: www.emsb.qc.ca/johngrant/

John Grant High School (French: École secondaire John Grant) is a high school located in Côte Saint-Luc, Quebec, Canada and a part of the English Montreal School Board (EMSB).

It was previously a part of the Protestant School Board of Greater Montreal.
