= Royal West Academy =

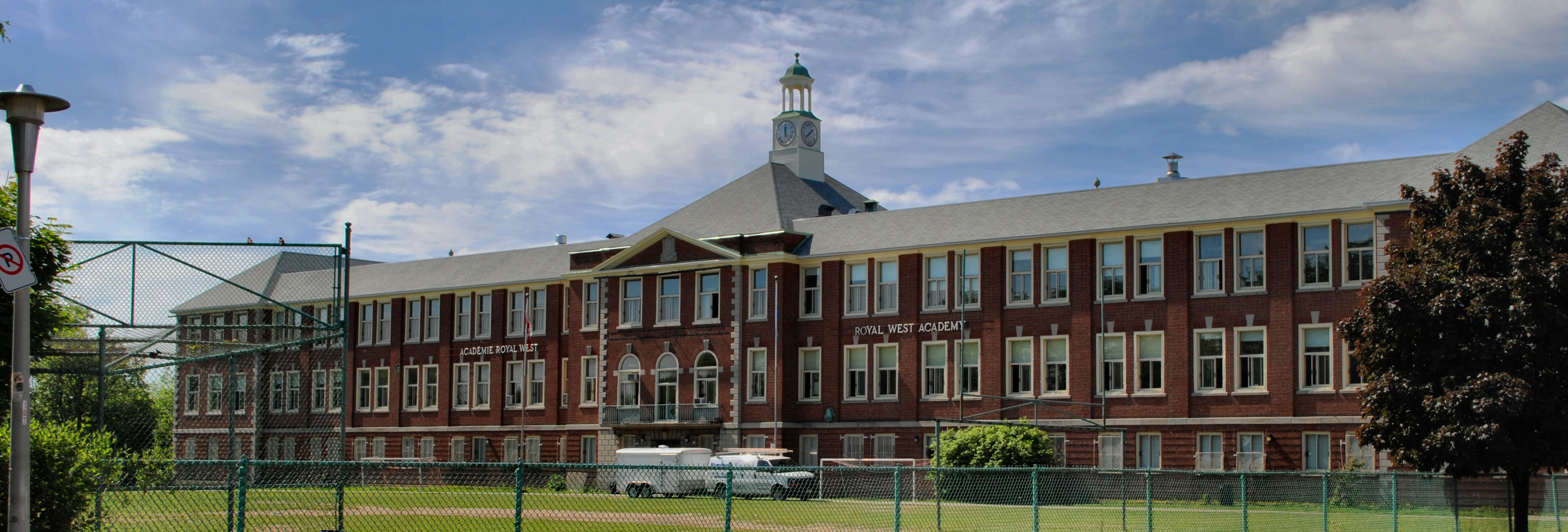

Location
- 189 Easton Ave; Montreal West, Quebec, H4X 1L4; Canada; 45.4500°N 73.6432°W

Information
- School type: Secondary school
- Motto: Carpe diem
- School board: English Montreal School Board
- Grades: 7–11
- Enrollment: 851
- Language: English
- Colours: Blue, Burgundy, White and Grey
- Website: www.royalwestacademy.com

Royal West Academy (commonly referred to as Royal West or RWA; French: Académie Royal West) is a public alternative anglophone secondary school in Montreal West, Quebec. Royal West has limited enrollment, and prospective students are only admitted after an entrance examination and interview. Royal West Academy is part of the English Montreal School Board (EMSB).

== History ==
The grounds where Royal West is now located once belonged to the Aberdeen School of Coteau Saint-Pierre, founded in 1894. It was renamed Montreal West High School in 1921. Ten years later, in 1931, the building was demolished and a larger building was built in its place. Between 1951 and 1959 an extension to the main structure was built to make way for an elementary school. The extension is referred to as the west wing.

In 1980, the elementary school was closed because of poor enrollment. The Royal Vale elementary school moved in, but was closed as well. In 1983, the Royal Vale French immersion high school and Montreal West High School merged to form Royal West Academy.

Until 1998 the school was within the Protestant School Board of Greater Montreal.

One of the RWA Logos

== Admission process ==
The EMSB allows Royal West to choose the first 180 students who score the highest points on the entrance exams held, usually, in October. The first 75-80 students with the highest grades get an "early acceptance"; the next 300 are interviewed, where they choose the next 110 that get to attend the following school year. Royal West has also placed high in scholastic math competitions, including its rank of first in Quebec in 2006.

== Controversy ==
In 2025, Royal West Academy suspended a high school student for criticizing the state of Israel on her private Instagram account because of Israeli war crimes. The student was punished for their political views against genocide. The teen’s parents filed an ombudsman complaint with the English Montreal School Board (EMSB) which oversees the school. EMSB spokesperson Mike Cohen said the school board stands by the suspension: “Any time a student feels threatened by something another student does, it could be considered bullying.” The definitions of "bullying" and "violence," taken from Quebec's Education Ministry, involve the targeting of a person or group of people which the student’s posts did not do. According to James Turk, the director of the Centre for Free Expression at Toronto Metropolitan University, the school misinterpreted those definitions and, in any case, has no authority under the Charter of Rights and Freedoms to punish speech others don't like. He stated that “To object to a student's post because it was critical of a country, it's just beyond the pale. It's outrageous”.

== Student groups ==
=== Environment Committee ===
Royal West Academy's Environment Committee is made up of students in grades 8 through to 11 who share the common goal of protecting our natural environment. The committee holds a variety of events throughout the school year to raise awareness of numerous environmental issues during waste reduction week and earth week.

== Notable graduates ==
- Emily Darlington (née Thomas), UK politician, member of British Parliament
- Tim Fletcher of The Stills, musician
- Adam Gollner, author
- Dan Guterman, Brazilian-Canadian producer, staff writer, The Colbert Report
- Karl R. Hearne, film director
- Anna Hopkins, television actress
- Laurin Liu, politician, former NDP MP
- Parker Mitchell, co-CEO and co-Founder of Engineers Without Borders Canada
- Robert Naylor, film and television actor
- Nick Nemeroff, comedian, Juno award nominee
- Conrad Pla, Spanish-Canadian television actor
- Jacob Tierney, film and television actor, director, screenwriter
- Kaya Turski, freestyle skier, Winter X Games gold medallist
- Nik Witkowski, rugby centre for Canada national rugby union team & Coventry R.F.C., UK
- Dorothy Yeats, Olympian and gold medallist at the inaugural Youth Olympic Games in wrestling (70 kg)

== See also ==
- Garbage Bowl, played at Royal West Academy yearly since 1950
