= Marymount Academy =

Coordinates: 45°28′56″N 73°37′12″W

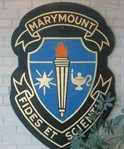

Location
- 5100, chemin de la Côte-Saint-Luc; Montreal, Quebec, H3G 2W9; Canada

Information
- School type: Public
- Motto: Fides et Scientia (Faith and Knowledge)
- Established: 1961; as Marymount Academy, 1984
- School board: English Montreal School Board
- Principal: James Fequet
- Enrollment: 850
- Colours: Blue and Gold
- IBMYP Coordinator: Maria Raskin
- Website: www.emsb.qc.ca/marymount

Marymount Academy (commonly referred to as Marymount, French: Académie Marymount) is a public secondary school in Montreal, Quebec, Canada. Directed by the English Montreal School Board (EMSB), Marymount offers an International Program of Studies based on the philosophy of the International Baccalaureate Organization (IBO) while still following Quebec Ministerial objectives as well the Regular program of studies (MEQ). The school serves around 400 to 500 students of very diverse cultural backgrounds mostly from the borough of Côte-des-Neiges–Notre-Dame-de-Grâce.

== History ==
Marymount High School was founded in 1961 and offered programs separately for boys and girls. In 1970 these separate programs were merged under the Marymount Comprehensive High School. In 1984, Marymount Academy adopted its present name and was relocated to 5100 Côte Saint-Luc Road, where it currently resides. By 1990, school uniforms were instituted as compulsory, and in 1996 the International Baccalaureate Program was established.

Prior to 1998 it was operated by the Montreal Catholic School Commission.

== Programs of Study ==
The Regular program, as it is referred to in the school, follows the curriculum set by the Quebec Ministry of Education for Secondary school grades 8 to 11. The class offered range from the mandatory courses as well as enriched science and math courses required to study sciences in CEGEP. In order to obtain a Quebec Secondary School Diploma, students must accumulate a total of 54 credits in Sec. IV and V.

Marymount Academy also offers an International Programme of Studies based on the philosophies of the International Baccalaureate Organization (IBO) Middle Years Programme (MYP). The aim of the programme is to help students relate the content of the classroom to the realities of the world outside by combining knowledge, experience and critical observation. To graduate with from the IB programme the student must pass the MELS (Ministère de l'Éducation, du Loisir et du Sport) portion of the curriculum and subsequently pass the requirements of the IBO MYP. The IBO requirements include community service, completion of a portfolio of achievement at every grade level and the completion of the personal project.

== Cultural diversity ==
Marymount Academy is a paragon of Canadian multiculturalism. Marymount's diverse environment is composed of students from many ethnic groups and religions. The location of the school in the middle of two neighbourhoods attracts students from the culturally rich areas of Notre-Dame-de-Grâce and Côte-des-Neiges. This further establishes the IBO areas of interaction stimulating open minds and diverse thinking; representative of the school's environment.

== The MAG Team ==
The Marymount Action Group (MAG) is a student-teacher initiative whose goals are to encourage student awareness. The group's main objectives are advocacy of peace, democracy, solidarity among citizens, and environmental awareness; similar to that of the Brundtland Green Schools network. The group, made up of a few dedicated students and teachers, undertakes various projects throughout the school year to advance their cause.

=== Brundtland Green Schools (BGE/EVB) ===
Due in part to the MAG team and various other groups and events, Marymount Academy became the first ever English school in the province of Quebec to receive the title of being a BGE school. A special ceremony was held in the school to commemorate the receiving of the title. During the event, members of the MAG team and other notable students were given certificates in recognition.

== See also ==
- English Montreal School Board
- International Baccalaureate Organization
- International Baccalaureate Middle Years Program
