= Montréal-Ouest =

Montréal-Ouest Montreal West
- City
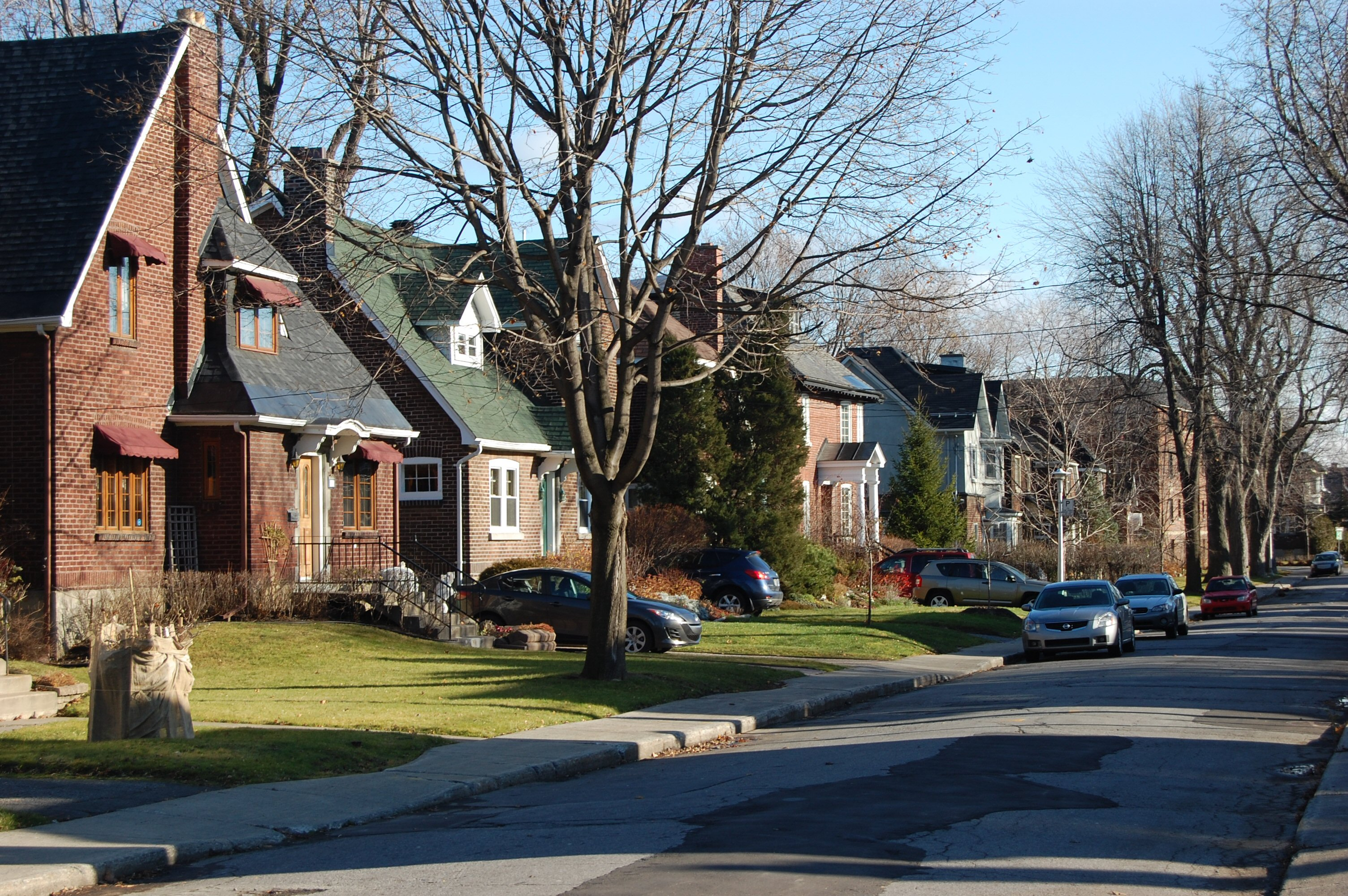
- Nicknames: The Garden Suburb, MoWest
- Motto: Justitia Omnibus (Latin for "Justice for All")
- Location on the Island of Montreal

- Location in southern Quebec
- Coordinates: 45°27′13″N 73°38′50″W
- Country: Canada
- Province: Quebec
- Region: Montreal
- RCM: None
- Founded: 1897
- Constituted: January 1, 2006

Government
  - Mayor: Jonathan Cha
  - Federal riding: Notre-Dame-de-Grâce—Westmount
  - Prov. riding: Notre-Dame-de-Grâce

Area
  - Total: 1.42 km^{2} (0.55 sq mi)
  - Land: 1.37 km^{2} (0.53 sq mi)

Population (2021)
  - Total: 5,115
  - Density: 3,737.9/km^{2} (9,681/sq mi)
  - Dwellings: 2,031
- Demonym: MoWester
- Time zone: UTC−05:00 (EST)
  - Summer (DST): UTC−04:00 (EDT)
- Postal code(s): H4X, H4B
- Area codes: 514 and 438
- Highways A-20: R-138
- Website: montreal-west.ca/en/

Montréal-Ouest (French for 'Montreal West', pronounced [mɔ̃ʁeal wɛst]) is an on-island municipality in southwestern Quebec, Canada, on the Island of Montreal.

Montréal-Ouest is a small, close-knit community made up primarily of single-family dwellings.

Sherbrooke Street, a major artery spanning most of the Island of Montreal, has its western terminus here, beginning at a T-intersection with the town's main street, Westminster Avenue.

== History ==
In 1897, the Town of Montreal West was created when it separated from the Village Municipality of Notre-Dame-de-Grâce-Ouest. It had 50 houses and a population of 350 persons at that time. Its town hall was built in 1910.

On January 1, 2002, as part of the 2002–2006 municipal reorganization in Montreal, Montreal West and the neighbouring suburbs of Côte-Saint-Luc and Hampstead were merged into the City of Montreal and became the borough of Côte-Saint-Luc–Hampstead–Montreal West. Following a change of government and a 2004 referendum in which the population voted to de-merge by a wide margin, Montreal West was reconstituted as an independent city on January 1, 2006.

== Demographics ==
Historical populations
Year	Pop.	±%
1966	6,612	—
1971	6,365	−3.7%
1976	5,980	−6.0%
1981	5,514	−7.8%
1986	5,382	−2.4%
1991	5,180	−3.8%
1996	5,254	+1.4%
2001	5,172	−1.6%
2006	5,184	+0.2%
2011	5,085	−1.9%
2016	5,050	−0.7%
2021	5,115	+1.3%

In the 2021 Canadian census conducted by Statistics Canada, Montréal-Ouest had a population of 5,115 living in 1,943 of its 2,031 total private dwellings, a change of 1.3% from its 2016 population of 5,050. With a land area of 1.37 km^{2} (0.53 sq mi), it had a population density of 3,733.6/km^{2} (9,669.9/sq mi) in 2021.

Home language (2021)
Language	Population	Percentage
English	3,660	71.6%
French	720	14.1%
Other	370	7.2%

Mother tongue (2016)
Language	Population	Percentage
English	2,905	60%
French	920	19%
Other	1,000	21%

Visible minorities (2016)
Ethnicity	Population	Percentage
Not a visible minority	3,150	78.2%
Visible minorities	880	21.8%

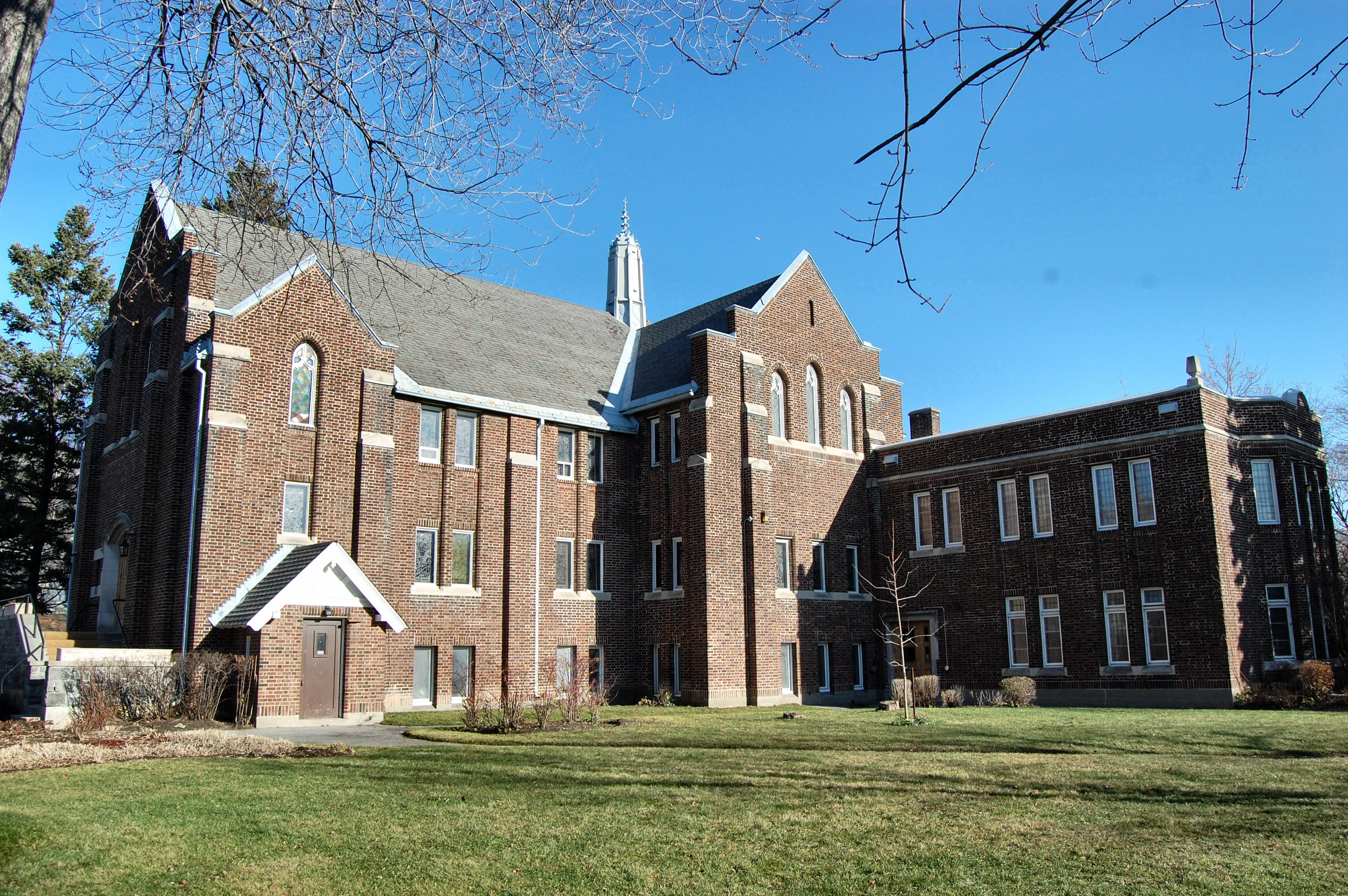
Montreal West United Church.

Montréal-Ouest includes three medium-sized churches. One is United (Montreal West United Church ), one is Anglican (St. Philip's Church), and the final is Presbyterian (Montreal West Presbyterian Church). The Montreal West United Church also rents space to a Pentecostal service (Overcomers Assembly). St. Philip's Anglican Church rents space to the New Life Korean Presbyterian Church.

== Politics and government ==
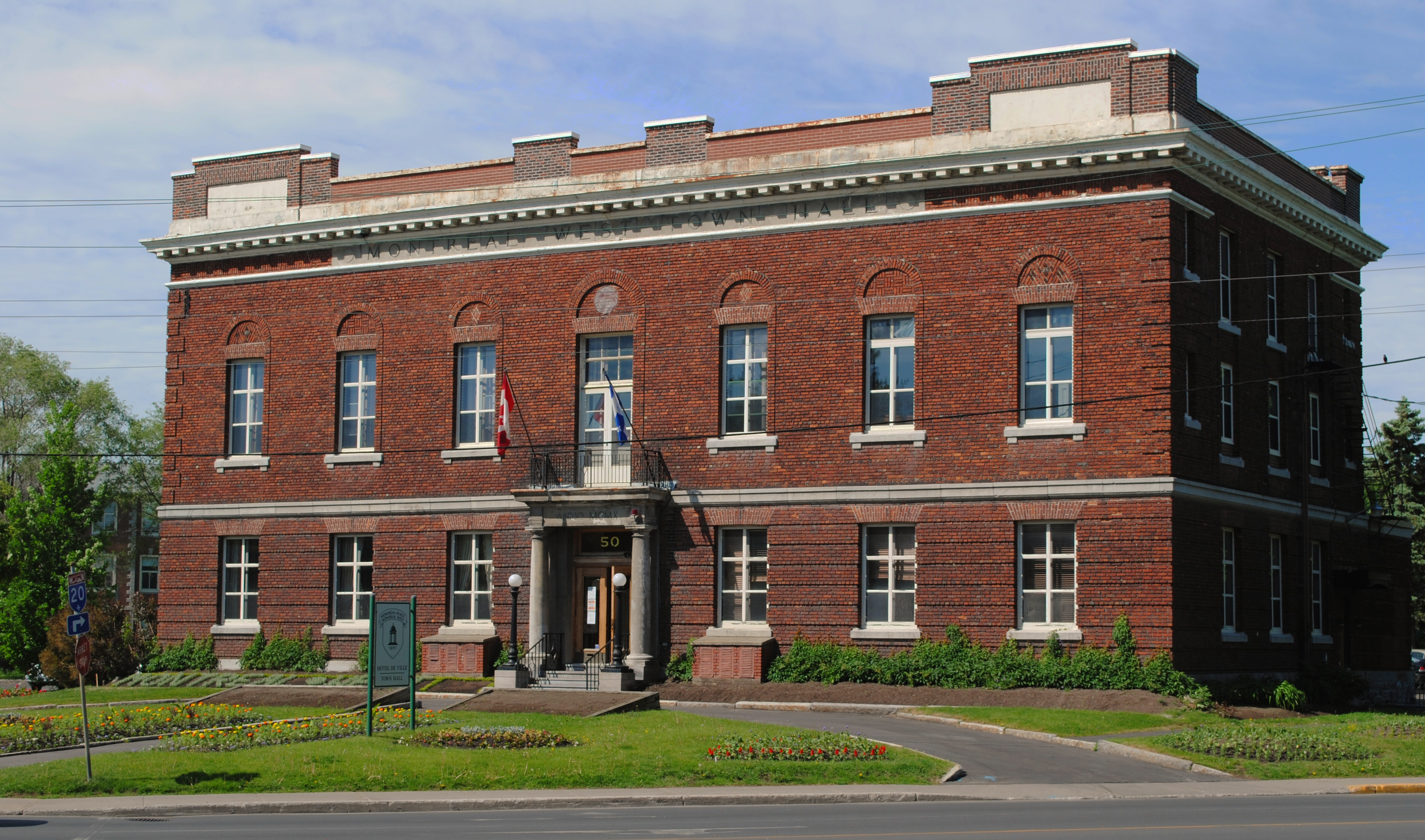
Montreal West Town Hall

=== Municipal council ===
Municipal council:

District	Position	Name
—	Mayor	Jonathan Cha
Seat 1	City councillor	Lauren Small-Pennefather
Seat 2	City councillor	Martha Slocombe
Seat 3	City councillor	Nick Tassé
Seat 4	City councillor	Philippe Bergeron

In terms of services, the town has its own Public Works Department, Public Security Department, a fire station, a community center (named after former town mayor John A. Simms), and a town hall.

=== Law enforcement ===
The town's various codes and ordinances are upheld by its Public Security Department, consisting of a lieutenant with a team of "By-Law Enforcement Constables" under his supervision.

=== List of mayors ===
List of former mayors:

- 1897 – William Smithson Lingley
- 1898 – Charles McClatchie
- 1899 – B.W. Grigg
- 1900 – J.J. Kirkpatrick
- 1901 – Walter C. Flyfe
- 1902 – Edward J. Bedbrook
- 1903 – C.C. Ballantyne
- 1904 – Edward J. Bedbrook
- 1905 – William Smithson Lingley
- 1906 – J.J. Kirkpatrick
- 1908 – Edward J. Bedbrook
- 1909–1910 – C.J. Davies
- 1911–1927 – James Ballantyne
- 1927–1935 – Harry Aird
- 1935–1943 – James R. Pearson
- 1943–1948 – Robert Hope Ross
- 1948–1954 – George W. Hodgson
- 1954–1963 – Forest Norman Wiggins
- 1963–1965 – Everett Charles Kirkpatrick
- 1965–1973 – Robert Arthur McQueen
- 1973–1977 – Alistair Reekie
- 1977–1989 – Roy D. Locke
- 1989–2001 – John A. Simms
- (2002–2005 – part of the city of Montreal)
- 2006–2009 – Campbell Stuart
- 2009–2025 – Beny Masella
- 2025–present – Jonathan Cha

=== Federal and provincial politics ===
The Town of Montreal West is located in the federal riding of Notre-Dame-de-Grâce—Westmount, represented by Anna Gainey, and the provincial riding of Notre-Dame-de-Grâce, represented by Désirée McGraw.

== Events ==
=== Canada Day ===
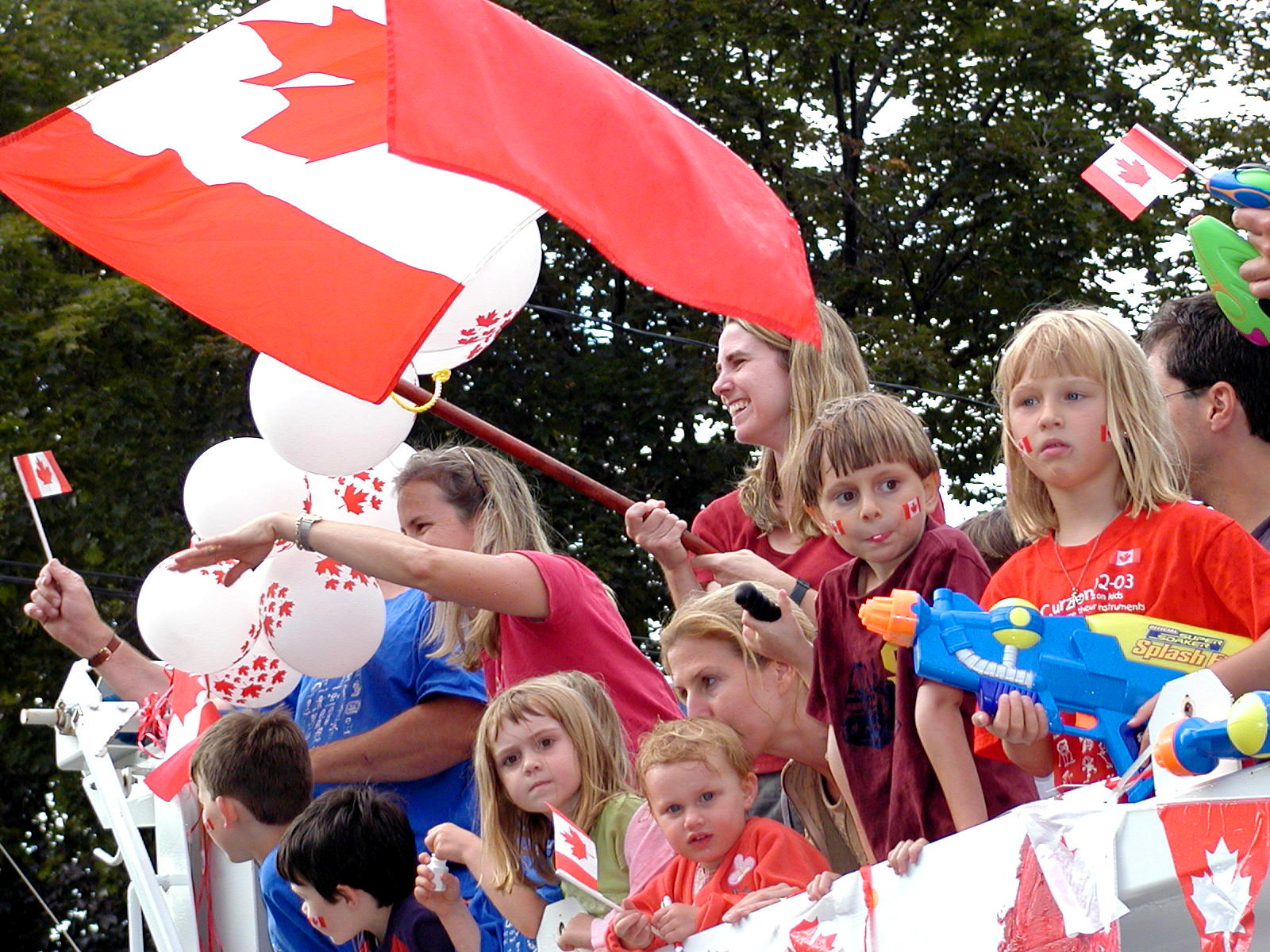
The Montreal West Canada Day Parade making its way along Westminster Avenue

Canada Day is the largest community event of the year in Montréal-Ouest. Residents organize a parade route that mainly runs down the main street of Westminster and ends at Strathearn Park. Floats represented in the parade include organizations and clubs located in town, as well as some created personally by residents.

In some years, there have been water fights between sidelined residents and members of the parade (mainly the swimming pool float). Water fights during these years have seen water balloons and super soaker water guns, as well as the odd hose drawn from a house. Organizers have tried to minimize these activities in recent years so as not to detract from the parade itself, with varying success.

Following the parade, residents converge on Strathearn Park for a giant picnic/BBQ. Many children's games and activities go on at the park, as well as in the nearby Percival park. The final event of the evening is the fireworks, which take place around 10pm at Hodgson Field.

=== Fête Nationale du Québec ===
Annually on June 23 (the day before the actual holiday) there is a picnic at Davies Park, featuring music performed by Québécois musicians. In the late evening, a large bonfire is held in the centre of the park.

=== Garbage Bowl ===
The Garbage Bowl is a yearly tradition held every January 1 since 1950, where men from Montréal-Ouest separate into two teams, the Northern Combines in red longjohns and the Southern Bombers in green longjohns, and play a football game in the frigid weather with proceeds from donations, food, and commemorative pins going to charity.

== Parks and recreation ==
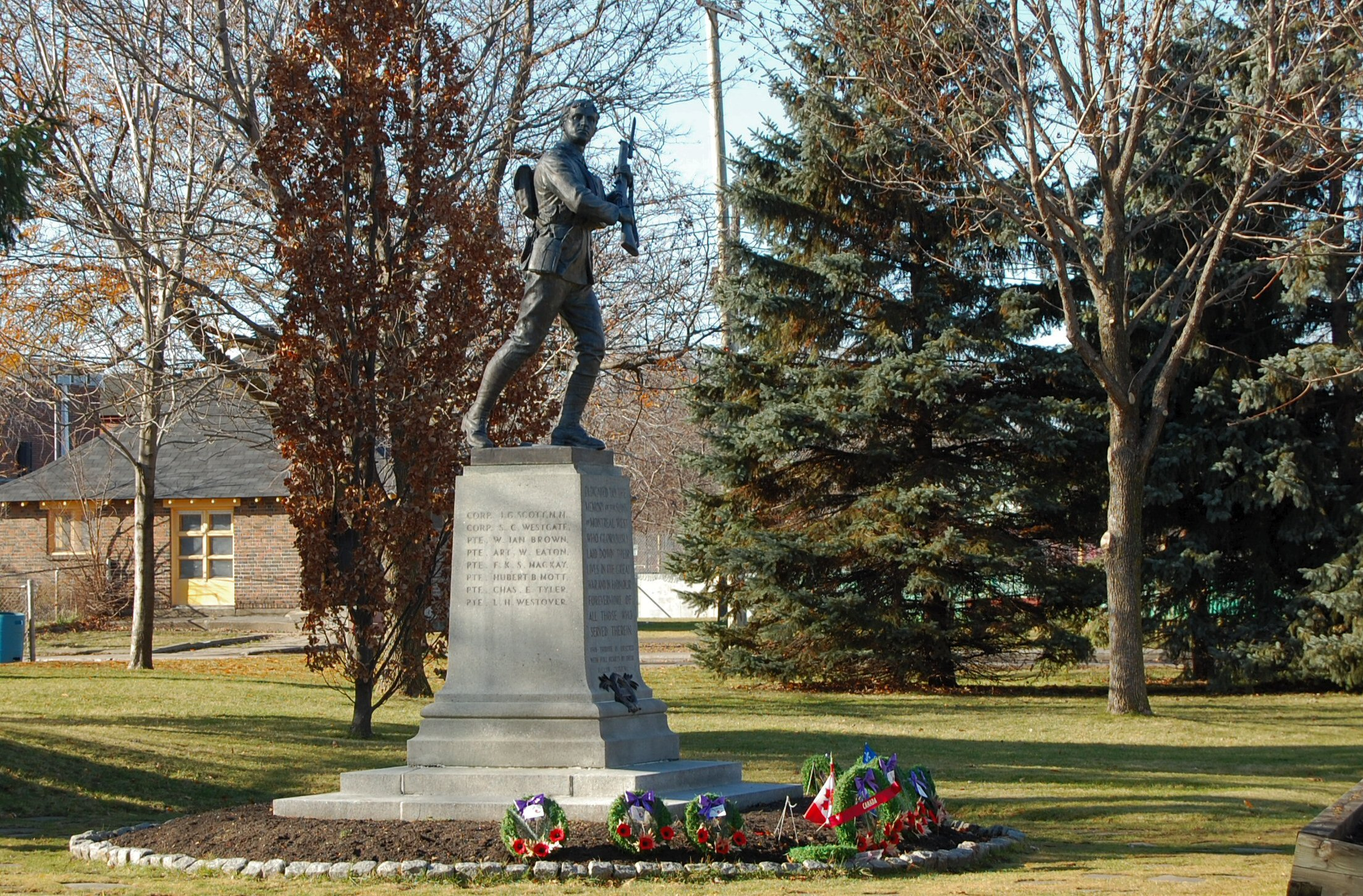
The War Memorial of Montreal West.

The town of Montréal-Ouest has a large number of neighbourhood parks and public spaces. They include: Dave Reid Park, Davies Park, George Booth Park, Hodgson Park, John A. Simms Park, Kirkpatrick Park, Memorial Park, Percival Park, Ronald Park, Roy D. Locke Park, Rugby Park, Sheraton Park, Strathearn Park and Toe Blake Park (which was named after former Montreal Canadiens head coach Toe Blake). The town also has an indoor ice skating rink, clay tennis courts, and a public swimming pool.

The core business area of Montréal-Ouest is located on Westminster Avenue between Sherbrooke and Curzon. Until 2010, it consisted exclusively of small, non-franchised businesses, but in a controversial decision, the Pharmaprix drugstore chain was allowed to open a large outlet on the corner of Westminster and Sherbrooke Street.

== Public transportation ==
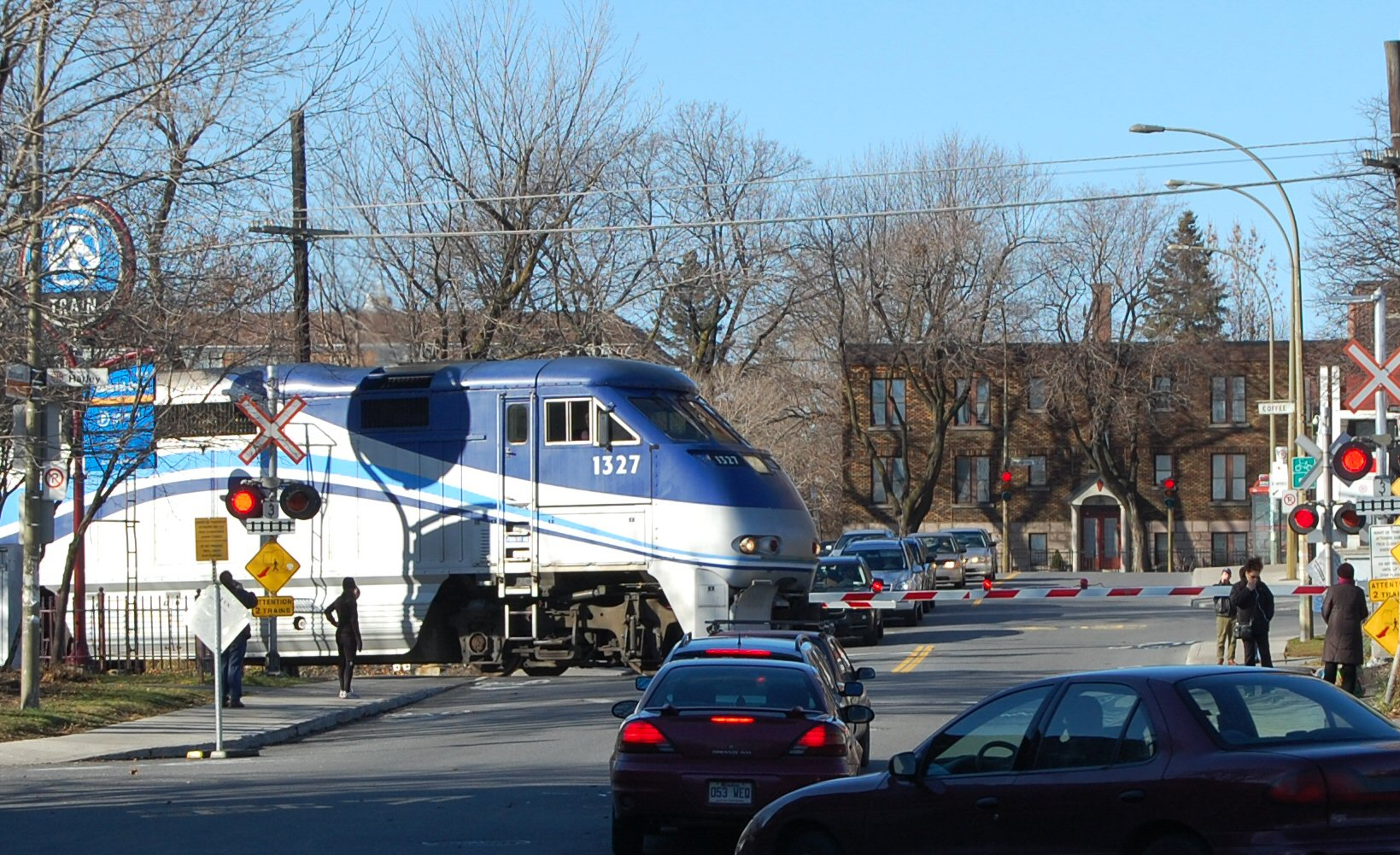
A train passing through Montréal-Ouest train station.

Montréal-Ouest is serviced by six Société de transport de Montréal bus lines. Each of these connects to a corresponding Montreal Metro (subway) station or to the Montréal-Ouest Train Station. Trains that run through this station connect passengers to downtown Montreal on one end, and three different routes heading away from the city at the other end.

Bus routes servicing Montréal-Ouest
Société de transport de Montréal
No. and Route Name	Service Times	Connections
51 Édouard-Montpetit	All-day local	Snowdon Montréal-Ouest
90 Saint-Jacques	All-day local	Vendôme
105 Sherbrooke	All-day local	Montréal-Ouest Vendôme
123 Dollard / Shevchenko	All-day local	Montréal-Ouest
162 Westminster	All-day local	Montréal-Ouest Villa-Maria
356 ☾ Sherbrooke	Overnight local	

It was also planned that the Pink Line (Montreal Metro) would be connecting in the Montreal Ouest region in the distant future.

== Education ==
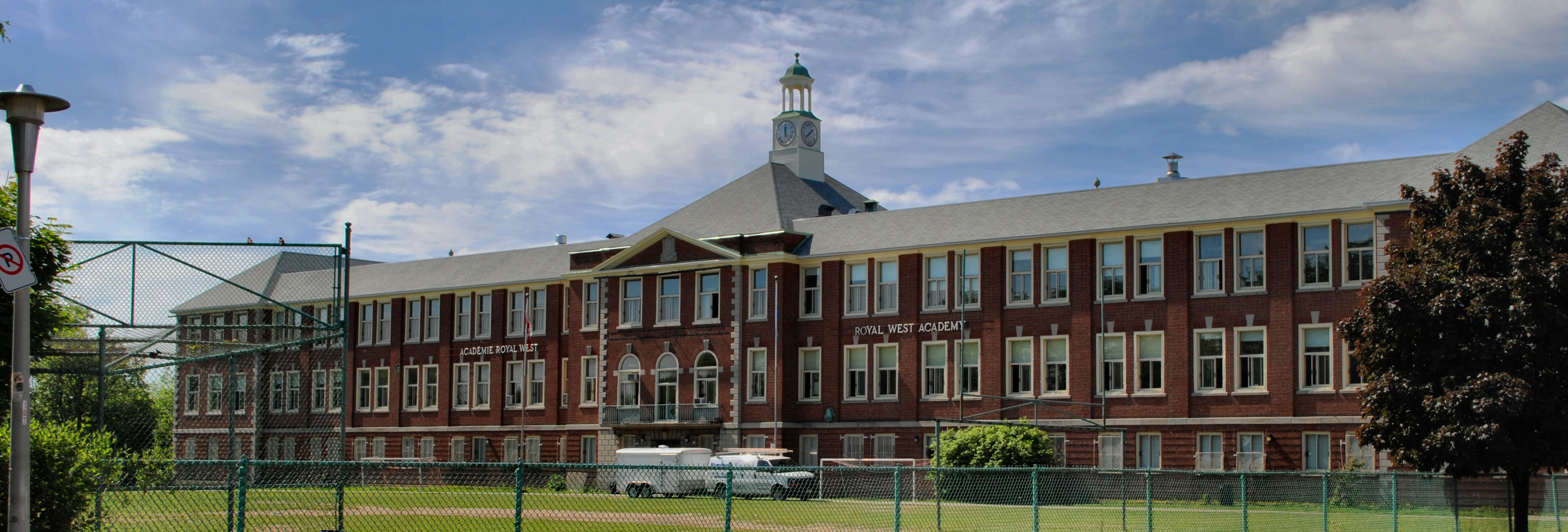
Royal West Academy, the highest rated English-language public school in Quebec.

Montréal-Ouest is notable for having Quebec's highest rated Anglophone public high school, Royal West Academy (ranked 39th overall in 2005 by the Fraser Institute). It also has Loyola High School, a private school. It also has two Anglophone elementary schools, Elizabeth Ballantyne Elementary School and Edinburgh Elementary School which offers French immersion. These schools are part of the English Montreal School Board. Concordia University has a campus (Loyola Campus) located in Montreal-Ouest.

The town has a public children's library located in Elizabeth Ballantyne school. A library for all age groups is located on Westminster Avenue.

== Media ==
The Town of Montreal West prints a newspaper called The Informer on a monthly basis, excluding the summer. There are 9 editions of The Informer published per year. This newspaper is meant to foster a small-town atmosphere and to keep Montréal-Ouest citizens up to date on town information. The Informer was initially published under the name The Citizen's Viewspaper in 1973 by a group of Montreal West citizens before being changed to its current name. The Town of Montreal West has agreed to subsidize this paper to date.

== Notable people ==
- Toe Blake, Montreal Maroons and Montreal Canadiens hockey player
- Stuart McLean, writer
- Doug and Dorothy Yeats, Olympic wrestlers

== See also ==
- List of anglophone communities in Quebec
