= Rosemount High School (Montreal) =

Location
- 3737 Beaubien Street East; Montreal, Quebec, H1X 1H2; Canada; 45°33′34.394″N 73°35′00.196″W

Information
- School type: Public, Co-Ed Secondary School
- Motto: Labor Omnia Vincit (Hard work conquers all)
- Founded: 1951
- School board: English Montreal School Board
- Grades: 7-11
- Language: English
- Colours: Black; Red
- Team name: Jaguars
- Website: www.emsb.qc.ca/rosemount/

Rosemount High School (French: École secondaire Rosemount) is an English-language high school located in Montreal, Quebec, Canada.

== History ==
Rosemount High School opened in 1951. Initially a high school of the former Protestant School Board of Greater Montreal, in July 1998, Rosemount became a French-immersion high school of the English Montreal School Board.

== Description ==
Rosemount is situated on Beaubien Street East, across the street from Parc Étienne-Desmarteau and Collège Rosemont.

The school offers a French immersion program in addition to its English core program. It also offers a special music program as well as drama and visual arts programs.

School facilities include two double gymnasiums, an auditorium that can seat 762 people, a library, a computer lab, specialized drama & art rooms, two circular sound-proofed music rooms, and a large soccer field.

The school building has 3 wings; 2 of those wings have 2 floors. The 2100 wing is the main hallway, the old gym, the main office and the guidance office. The 3100 wing is situated on top of the 2100 wing and has classrooms. The 2400 wing, on the same floor as the 2100 wing, has classrooms, the computer lab, the library, the New Gym, the art room and a science lab. The 3400 wing has classrooms including a large drama room and a senior square for the senior students to hang out. The 3300 wing has science labs and classrooms. A soccer field and tennis court are behind the school.

The Music Concentration Program has a wing behind the school's auditorium, which can hold up to 762 people. It is named for the founder of the music department and a dedicated music teacher at the school for many years, Mrs. Helen Hall, who died in 1999.
