= English Montreal School Board =

Largest English-speaking Quebec school board

English Montreal School Board Commission scolaire English-Montréal
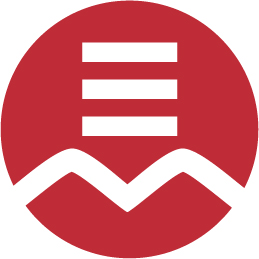

Location
- 6000 Fielding Avenue; Montreal, Quebec Canada

District information
- Schools: 30 Elementary Schools; 3 Elementary/Secondary Schools; 21 Secondary Schools; 7 Social Affairs Schools; 10 Adult and Vocational Education Centres

Students and staff
- Students: 44,000

Other information
- Website: www.emsb.qc.ca

The English Montreal School Board (official name: Commission scolaire English-Montréal English-Montréal School Board; CSEM or EMSB) is one of five public school boards and one of two English-language school boards on the island of Montreal in Quebec, Canada. Its territory consists of 14 of Montreal's 19 boroughs (Note: Anjou, Montréal-Nord, Outremont, Saint-Laurent, Saint-Léonard, Ville-Marie, Ahuntsic-Cartierville, Mercier–Hochelaga-Maisonneuve, Rosemont–La Petite-Patrie, Villeray–Saint-Michel–Parc-Extension, Côte-des-Neiges–Notre-Dame-de-Grâce, Rivière-des-Prairies–Pointe-aux-Trembles, Plateau-Mont-Royal and Sud-Ouest) as well as the municipalities of Côte-Saint-Luc, Hampstead, Montréal-Est, Montréal-Ouest, Mont-Royal and Westmount.

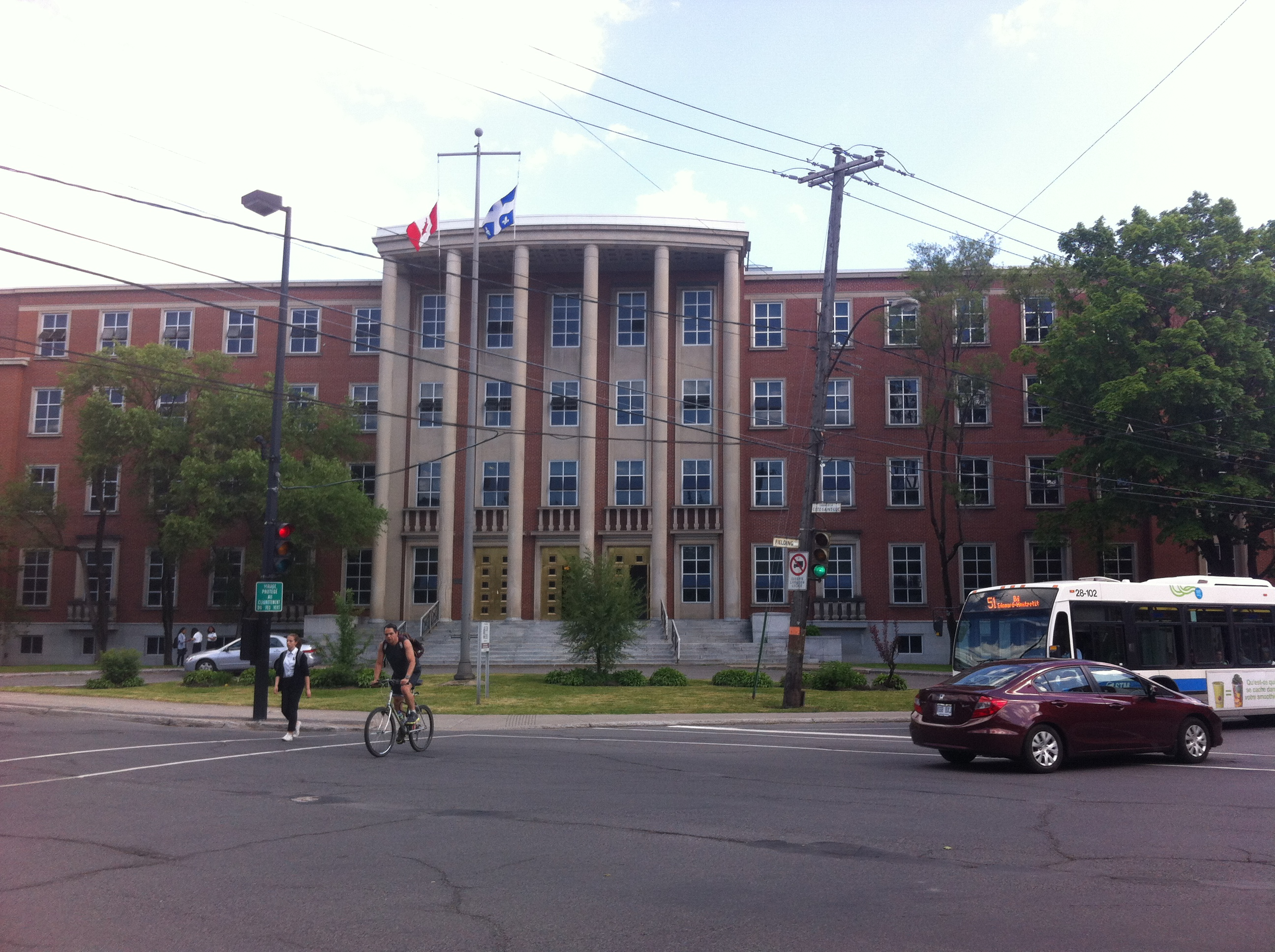
EMSB Administration Building

The Administration Building of the EMSB is located at 6000 Fielding Avenue in Notre-Dame-de-Grâce. The building was formerly occupied by the Protestant School Board of Greater Montreal (PSBGM).

== History ==
The Government of Quebec reorganized the province's public school boards in the mid-1990s. School boards in Quebec had been organized along religious confessional lines, Catholic and Protestant, since before Canadian Confederation. The province of Quebec was guaranteed a confessional public school system by the British North America Act, 1867, now known as the Constitution Act, 1867. The provincial government was required to ask the federal government to amend the Canadian Constitution if it were to reorganize school boards along linguistic lines (English and French). The amendment was passed by both the House of Commons and the Senate, notwithstanding the unresolved constitutional debate between Quebec and the rest of Canada.

The EMSB officially began operations on July 1, 1998, after the English sectors of the Protestant School Board of Greater Montreal (PSBGM), the Montreal Catholic School Commission (CECM), the Commission scolaire Jérôme-Le Royer and the Commission scolaire Sainte-Croix were amalgamated to form the EMSB.

Enrollment in the English Montreal School Board's schools and centres continues to decline as it does in most English-language public school boards in Quebec. This is a part of an ongoing decline following the enactment of the Charter of the French Language by the Québec government in 1977.

Since the EMSB's creation in 1998, the board has closed 21 schools, most recently 2 elementary schools and 1 high school in 2020. The School Board's chairperson attributes the declining enrolment to Bill 101, families moving to cities with lower home taxes, such as Laval; and the general decline in birth rates.

In 2020, Joe Ortona, president of the board, was imposed a two-week suspension for violating the board's code of ethics after making disparaging remarks about a fellow commissioner. Julien Feldman, also a commissioner and vice-president of the board's ethics committee, had previously received six ethics complaints deemed founded, resulting in four reprimands and two suspensions.

The EMSB had the highest voter turnout among all school boards in Quebec, with 21%.

=== Corruption investigations ===
In 2016, EMSB was investigated by UPAC, the Quebec anti-corruption squad, in regards to its international student programs. The allegations relate to several Asian recruitment companies that were paid millions of dollars by the EMSB to facilitate the enrolment of foreign students, who in turn paid high tuition fees to the EMSB. Some teachers complained the international students did not have the necessary language skills to participate in the classroom and as a result the overall quality of education was diminished. At least one teacher resigned over the issue.

In 2019, the EMSB was placed under partial trusteeship under investigation for alleged mismanagement and ethical violations, after a preliminary report revealed a mishandling of "millions of dollars". The Ministry of Education appointed former Liberal Member of Parliament, Marlene Jennings, as the trustee in November.

== Academics ==
At 92.4 percent, the English Montreal School Board has the highest rate of students who earn a high school diploma among all public school boards in Quebec. This success rate is considerably higher than the provincewide average of 81.8 percent, and is only slightly lower than the 92.9 percent success rate for private schools.

== Political stands ==
In 2019, the EMSB said it would not enforce Bill 21, the Government of Quebec's proposed ban of public servants wearing religious symbols, stating that the board has never received a complaint from a parent or student about a teacher's religious symbol.

The EMSB deployed efforts to persuade federal government to challenge the legality of Quebec CAQ government's 2021 Bill 96 for a ruling to the Supreme Court.

== Organization ==
The Director General of the EMSB is Nick Katalifos, who is the school board's chief administrative officer.

Structurally, the EMSB has two Assistant Directors General: Jack H. Chadirdjian and Pela Nickoletopoulos. The school board also has three regional directors: Demetrios Giannacopoulos (west sector), Darlene Kehyayan (east sector), and Angela Spagnolo (adult education and vocational services). The school board also has a secretary-general: Mtre Nathalie Lauzière, who has a key role in the board's functioning.

=== List of chairs ===
Name	Term start	Term end
George Vathilakis	July 2, 1998	August 20, 2001
John Simms	September 12, 2001	November 21, 2003
Dominic Spiridigliozzi	November 25, 2003	November 9, 2007
Angela Mancini	November 14, 2007	July 15, 2020
Joe Ortona	November 6, 2020	Incumbent

=== List of vice-chairs ===
Name	Ward	Term start	Term end
Dominic Spiridigliozzi	15	July 2, 1998	November 21, 2003
Elizabeth Fokoefs	3	November 25, 2003	November 9, 2007
Sylvia Lo Bianco	15	November 14, 2007	November 7, 2014
Sylvia Lo Bianco	7	November 17, 2014	September 26, 2018
Joe Ortona	10	September 26, 2018	November 6, 2020
Agostino Cannavino	6	November 11, 2020	December 19, 2023
James Kromida	5	January 18, 2024	November 9, 2024
James Kromida	Saint-Laurent	November 13, 2024	

== List of EMSB Schools ==
This school board oversees 30 elementary schools, 3 elementary and secondary schools, 21 secondary schools, 7 social affairs institutions and 10 adult and vocational centres, in which over 44,000 students are enrolled.

=== Elementary schools ===
- Bancroft School
- Carlyle School
- Cedarcrest School
- Coronation School
- Dalkeith School
- Dante School
- Dunrae Gardens School
- East Hill School
- Edinburgh School
- Edward Murphy School
- Elizabeth Ballantyne School
- Gardenview School
- Gerald McShane School
- Hampstead School
- Honoré-Mercier School
- John Caboto Academy
- Leonardo da Vinci Academy
- Merton School
- Michelangelo International Elementary School
- Nesbitt Elementary School
- Our Lady of Pompei School
- Parkdale School
- Pierre de Coubertin School
- Pierre Elliott Trudeau School
- Roslyn School
- Sinclair Laird School
- St. Gabriel School
- St. Monica School
- Westmount Park School
- Westmount Park School
- Willingdon School

=== Elementary/Secondary Schools ===
- F.A.C.E. School
- Royal Vale School
- St. Raphael School

=== Secondary Schools ===
- James Lyng High School
- John F. Kennedy High School
- John Grant High School
- LaurenHill Academy
- Laurier Macdonald High School
- Lester B. Pearson High School
- L.I.N.K.S. High School
- Marymount Academy International
- M.I.N.D. High School
- Rosemount High School
- Royal West Academy
- Vincent Massey Collegiate
- Westmount High School
- Focus High School
- Options High School
- Outreach High School
- Perspectives I High School
- Perspectives II High School
- Programme Mile-End High School
- Venture High School
- Vezina High School

=== Social Affairs Schools ===
- Cité des Prairies
- Elizabeth High School
- Mackay Centre School
- Montreal Children's Hospital
- Mountainview School Project Centre
- Philip E. Layton School
- Sir Mortimer B. Davis School

=== Adult and Vocational Education Centres ===
- Galileo Adult Education Centre
- The HSM Adult Education Centre
- James Lyng Adult Education Centre
- John F. Kennedy Adult Education Centre
- Wagar Adult Education Centre
- Saint-Laurent Adult Education Centre
- Laurier Macdonald Vocational Centre
- Rosemount Technology Centre
- Shadd Health and Business Centre
- St. Pius X Career Centre
