= Montreal School Board =

Canadian school district serving part of the island of Montreal

Montreal School Board French: Commission scolaire de Montréal

District information
- Established: 1998
- Closed: 2020
- Schools: 129 elementary schools; 37 secondary schools; 28 schooling service centres; 13 adult education centres; 9 vocational training centres

Other information
- Website: csdm.qc.ca

The Montreal School Board (French: Commission scolaire de Montréal, CSDM) was a board from 1998 until 2020, as a result of a law passed by the Quebec government that changed the school board system from religious denomination to linguistic denomination.

Its main predecessor is the Montreal Catholic School Commission (Commission des écoles catholiques de Montréal or CÉCM) which was composed of both French and English Roman Catholic schools and had been in operation for over 150 years.

Until 2020, the CSDM operated 129 elementary schools, 37 secondary schools, 13 adult education centres, and 9 vocational training centres and 28 schooling service centres. It was replaced by the Centre de services scolaire de Montréal.

== 2000s issues ==
School board elections took place on Sunday, November 2, 2014. The position of chairman has been chosen by universal suffrage. This is for a four-year term. The last school board elections took place in 2007. The Mouvement pour une école moderne et ouverte keep all positions; president (Catherine Harel-Bourdon) and the 13 new chairs.

In November 2014 Yves Bolduc, the Minister of Education, Recreation and Sports of Quebec, suggested moving Ahuntsic – Cartierville, Côte-des-Neiges, Notre-Dame-de-Grâce, Le Sud-Ouest, and Westmount from the CSDM to the Commission scolaire Marguerite-Bourgeoys (CSMB), which would move 66 schools away from the CDSM, and therefore 30% of the total students of the CSDM. Some students would also move to the Commission scolaire de la Pointe-de-l'Île (CSPÎ).

François Cardinal of La Presse criticized the deal, saying that it was penalizing the CSDM and unfairly rewarding the CSMB.

== List of schools ==
=== Elementary schools ===
- École Arc-en-Ciel
- École Au Pied-de-La-Montagne
- École Barclay
- École Bedford
- École Champlain
- École Des Cinq-Continents
- École Des Nations
- École du Petit-Chapiteau
- École Élan
- École FACE (Also a High School)
- École Félix-Leclerc
- École François de Laval
- École Garneau
- École Internationale de Montréal primaire
- École Iona
- École Jean-Batispte-Meilleur
- École La Mennais
- École La Petite-Patrie
- École Lambert-Closse
- École Lanaudière
- École Laurier
- École Le Plateau
- École Les-Enfants-Du-Monde
- École Louis-Hippolyte-Lafontaine
- École Lucille-Teasdale
- École Madeleine-De-Verchères
- École Marc-Favreau
- École Marguerite-Bourgeoys
- École Marie-Favery
- Ecole Nazareth
- École Notre-Dame-des-Neiges
- École Paul-Bruchési
- École Philippe-Labarre
- École Saint-Anselme
- École Saint-Enfant-Jésus
- École Saint-Étienne
- École Saint-Léon-De-Westmount
- École Saint-Louis-de-Gonzague
- École Saint-Pascal-Baylon
- École Saint-Pierre-Claver
- École Simonne-Monet

=== High schools ===
- Académie Dunton
- Académie de Roberval
- École Chomedey-De Maisonneuve
- École de la Lancée
- École de la Source
- École Édouard-Montpetit
- École Espace-Jeunesse
- École secondaire Eulalie-Durocher
- École Eurêka
- École Évangeline
- École FACE
- École Georges-Vanier
- École Honoré-Mercier
- École internationale de Montréal
- École Irénée-Lussier
- École Jeanne-Mance
- École Joseph-Charbonneau
- École secondaire Joseph-François-Perrault
- École La Dauversière
- École le Tremplin
- École le Vitrail
- École la Voie
- École Louis-Joseph-Papineau
- École Louis-Riel
- École Louise-Trichet
- École Lucien-Pagé
- École secondaire Marguerite-De Lajemmerais
- École secondaire Marie-Anne
- École Père-Marquette
- École Pierre-Dupuy
- École Robert-Gravel
- École Rosalie-Jetté
- École Saint-Henri
- École Saint-Louis
- École Saint-Luc
- École Sophie-Barat

== See also ==
- Centre de services scolaire de Montréal
