= List of Montreal Catholic School Commission schools =

This is a list of schools in the Montreal Catholic School Commission.

== Schools at the time of closure ==
=== Anglophone schools ===
Secondary:

- James Lyng High School
- James Lyng Centre
- John F. Kennedy Comprehensive High School
- John F. Kennedy Centre
- Lester B. Pearson Comprehensive High School
- Marymount Academy
- Marymount Centre
- Paul VI High School
- Sir Wilfrid Laurier High School
- St. Pius X Comprehensive High School
- St. Pius X Centre
- St. Raphael High School
- Vincent Massey Collegiate

Elementary:

- Edward Murphy
- Emily Carr
- Francesca Cabrini
- Frederick Banting
- Gerald McShane
- John Caboto
- John XXIII
- Leonardo da Vinci
- Michelangelo (Rivière-des-Prairies)
- Nazareth
- Our Lady of Mount Royal
- Our Lady of Pompei
- St. Brendan
- St. Dorothy
- St. Gabriel
- St. Gerald
- St. Ignatius of Loyola
- St. John Bosco
- St. Kevin
- St. Monica
- St. Patrick
- St. Patrick (corner Dorchester and St.Urbain streets, Montreal)
- St. Raphael Centre

=== Francophone secondary schools ===
- Accès Est
- Accès Ouest
- Accès Nord
- École secondaire Calixa-Lavallée
- Centre Bathélemy-Vimont
- Centre Calixa-Lavallée
- Centre Champagnat
- Centre de commerce et de secrétariat Stella-Maris
- Centre de ressources en éducation populaire (CREP)
- Centre Gabrielle-Roy
- Centre Gédéon-Ouimet
- Centre La Clairière
- Centre Lartigue
- Centre Louis-Fréchette
- Centre Lucien-Pagé
- Centre Père-Marquette
- Centre Pierre-Dupuy
- Centre Saint-Henri
- Centre Saint-Louis
- Centre Saint-Pascal-Baylon
- Centre Saint-Paul
- Centre Sainte-Croix
- Centre Yves-Thériault
- Chomedey-de Maisonneuve
- École des métiers de l’aérospatiale de Montréal
- École des métiers de l’automobile
- École des métiers de la construction de Montréal
- École Internationale (secondaire)
- École Marguerite-de-Lajemmerais
- Édouard-Montpetit
- École secondaire Eulalie-Durocher
- Évangéline
- Georges-Vanier
- Henri-Bourassa
- Honoré-Mercier
- Jean-Grou
- Jean-Grou, annexe
- Jeanne-Mance
- École secondaire Joseph-François-Perrault
- Laurier
- Le Tremplin
- Louis-Joseph-Papineau
- Louis-Riel
- Louise-Trichet
- Lucien-Pagé
- Marc-Laflamme
- École secondaire Marguerite-De Lajemmerais
- École secondaire Marie-Anne
- Pavillon d’éducation communautaire
- Pierre-Dupuy
- Rosalie-Jetté
- Saint-Henri
- Saint-Luc
- École secondaire Sophie-Barat
- Urgel-Archambault

=== Francophone primary schools ===
- Adélard-Desrosiers
- Alice-Parizeau
- Alphonse-Desjardins
- Arc-en-ciel (alternative school)
- Armand-Lavergne
- Atelier (alternative school)
- Baril
- Barthélemy-Vimont
- Barthélemy-Vimont, annexe 1
- Barthélemy-Vimont, annexe 2
- Bienville
- Boucher-de-la-Bruère
- Champlain
- Charles-Bruneau
- Charles-Lemoyne
- Charlevoix (annexe Ludger-Duvernay)
- Christ-Roi
- Coeur-Immaculé-de-Marie
- De la Petite-Bourgogne
- Denise-Pelletier
- Dollard-des-Ormeaux
- École Internationale (primary)
- Élan (alternative school) (annexe Lanaudière)
- Étoile Filante (alternative school)
- Félix-Leclerc
- Fernand-Gauthier
- Fernand-Seguin
- François-de-Laval
- Gadbois
- Garneau
- Guillaume-Couture
- Guybourg
- Guy-Vanier
- Hélène-Boullé
- Henri-Julien
- Hochelaga
- Jean-Baptiste-Meilleur
- Jean-Jacques-Olier
- Jean-Nicolet
- Jeanne-Leber
- Jules-Verne
- La Dauversière
- La Mennais
- La Vérendrye
- La Visitation
- Lambert-Closse
- Lanaudière
- Le Carignan
- Le Caron
- Le Plateau
- Les Enfants du Monde
- Louis-Colin
- Louis-Dupire
- Louis-Hippolyte-Lafontaine
- Ludger-Duvernay
- Madeleine-de-Verchères
- Maîtrise des petits chanteurs du Mont-Royal
- Marc-Aurèle-Fortin
- Marguerite-Bourgeoys
- Marie-de-l’Incarnation
- Marie-Favery
- Marie-Reine-des-Coeurs
- Marie-Rivier
- Marie-Rivier, annexe
- Marie-Rollet
- Montcalm
- Notre-Dame-de-Fatima
- Notre-Dame-de-Grâce
- Notre-Dame-de-Grâce, annexe
- Notre-Dame-de-l’Assomption
- Notre-Dame-de-la-Défense
- Notre-Dame-de-la-Paix
- Notre-Dame-des-Neiges
- Notre-Dame-des-Victoires
- Notre-Dame-du-Foyer
- Notre-Dame-du-Perpétuel-Secours
- Paul-Bruchési
- Philippe-Labarre
- Pierre-de-Coubertin
- René-Guénette
- Rose-des-vents (alternative school)
- Saint-Albert-le-Grand
- Saint-Ambroise
- Saint-André-Apôtre
- Saint-Anselme
- Saint-Antoine-Marie-Claret
- Saint-Antonin
- Saint-Arsène
- Saint-Barthélémy
- Saint-Benoit
- Saint-Bernardin
- Saint-Clément
- Saint-Damase
- Saint-Donat
- Saint-Émile
- Saint-Enfant-Jésus
- Saint-Étienne
- Saint-Fabien
- Saint-François-d’Assise
- Saint-François-Solano
- Saint-François-Xavier
- Saint-Gabriel-Lalemant
- Saint-Gérard
- Saint-Grégoire-le-Grand
- Saint-Isaac-Jogues
- Saint-Jean-Baptiste
- Saint-Jean-Baptiste-de-la-Salle
- Saint-Jean-de-Brébeuf
- Saint-Jean-de-la-Croix
- Saint-Jean-de-la-Lande
- Saint-Jean-de-Matha
- Saint-Jean-Vianney
- Saint-Justin
- Saint-Léon
- Saint-Louis
- Saint-Louis-de-Gonzague
- Saint-Marc
- Saint-Mathieu
- Saint-Noël-Chabanel
- Saint-Nom-de-Jésus
- Saint-Pascal-Baylon
- Saint-Pascal-Baylon, annexe
- Saint-Paul-de-la-Croix
- Saint-Pierre-Apôtre
- Saint-Pierre-Claver
- Saint-Rémi
- Saint-Simon-Apôtre
- Saint-Vincent-Marie
- Saint-Zotique
- Sainte-Bernadette-Soubirous
- Sainte-Bibiane
- Sainte-Catherine-de-Sienne
- Sainte-Cécile
- Sainte-Claire
- Sainte-Colette
- Sainte-Gemma-Galgani
- Sainte-Gertrude
- Sainte-Jeanne-d’Arc
- Sainte-Louise-de-Marillac
- Sainte-Lucie
- Sainte-Odile
- Saints-Martyrs-Canadiens
- Victor-Doré
- Victor-Rousselot
