= Early life and career of Kamala Harris =

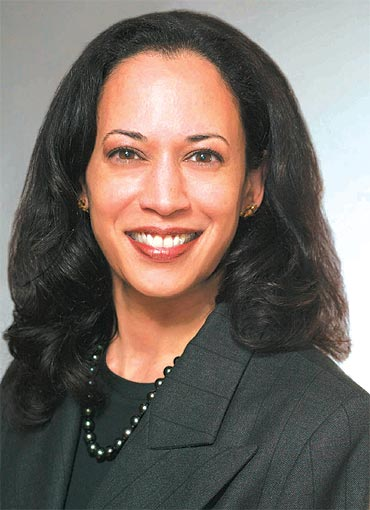
Harris as the 27th District Attorney of San Francisco, 2004

Kamala Devi Harris was born in Oakland, California, 1964 to biologist Shyamala Gopalan and economist Donald J. Harris. The Harris family moved to various locations in the Midwestern United States from 1966 to 1970, when she moved back to California. At the age of twelve, she moved to Montreal, Quebec, where she attended school through her first year of college. She then attended Howard University and the University of California College of the Law, San Francisco.

In her early career, Harris served as Alameda County Deputy District Attorney, then San Francisco County Assistant District Attorney, and then running the Family and Children's Services Division in the San Francisco City Attorney's Office. She then served two terms as District Attorney of San Francisco from 2004 to 2011.

== Early life and education ==
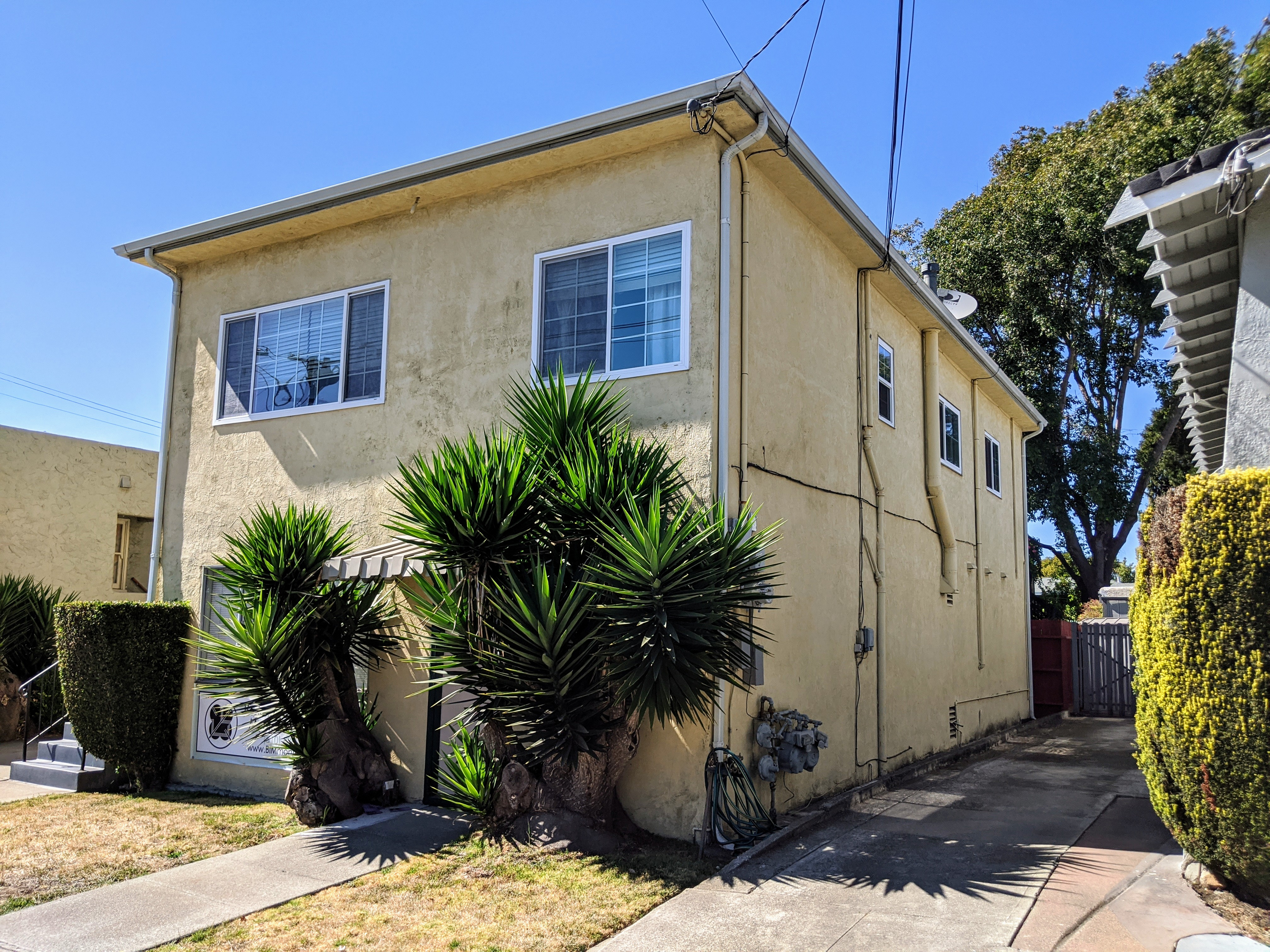
Harris's childhood home on Bancroft Way in Berkeley

Kamala Devi Harris (Note: Harris was originally named Kamala Iyer Harris by her parents, who two weeks later filed an affidavit by which her middle name was changed to Devi.) was born at Kaiser Permanente's Oakland Medical Center in Oakland, California, on October 20, 1964. The actual hospital building in which Harris was born no longer exists; it was demolished after the Oakland Medical Center moved to a newer building. Kamala Harris is a Black woman of Afro-Jamaican and Indian (Tamil) heritage.

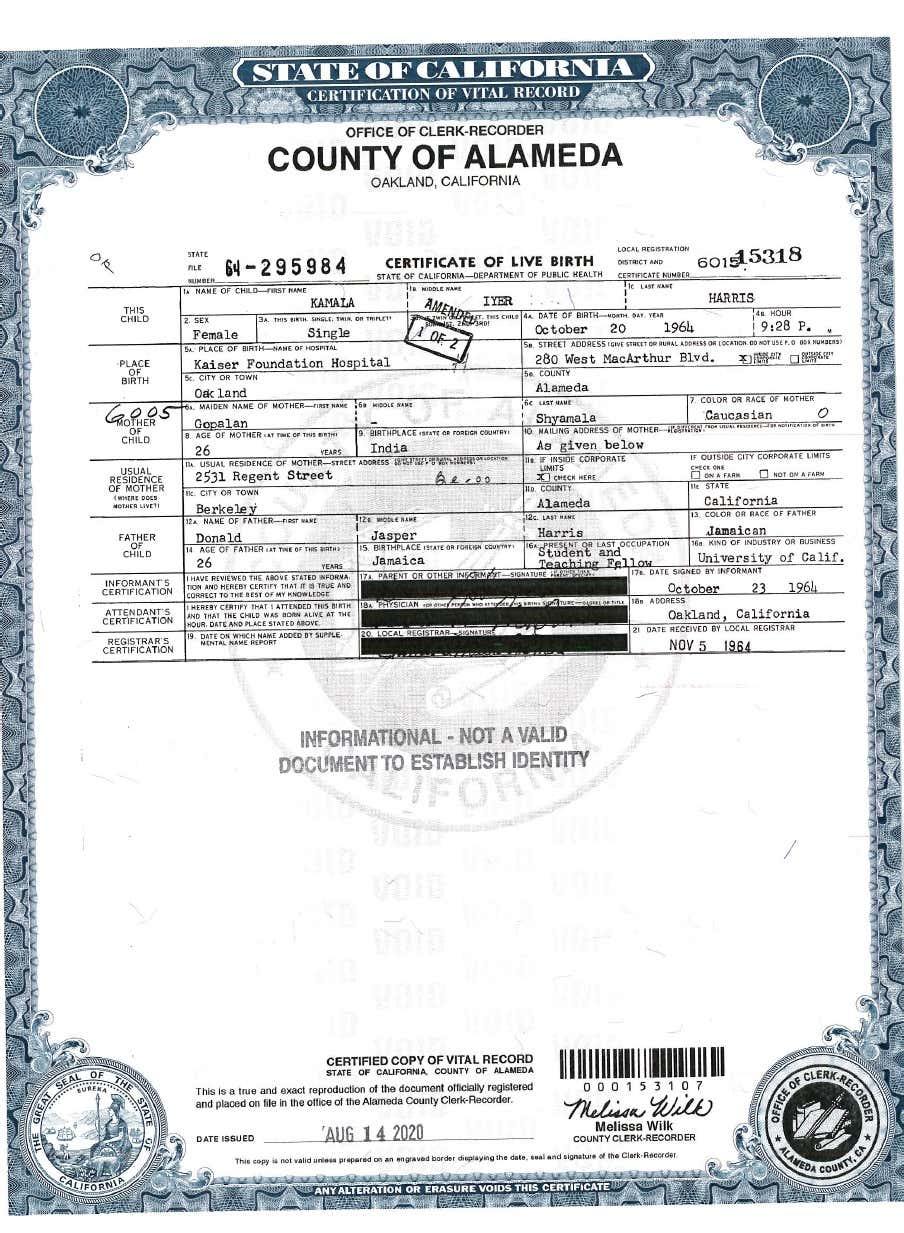
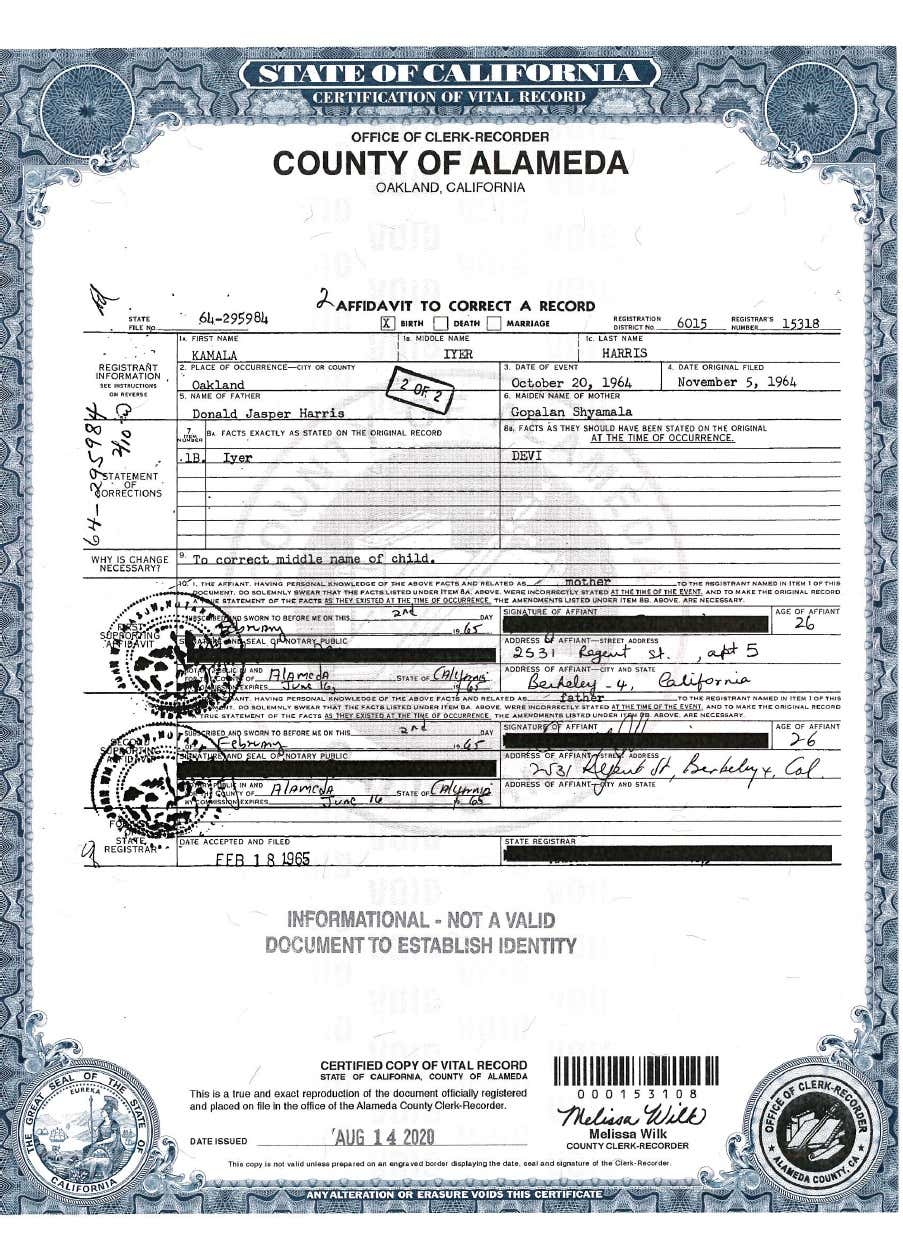
Harris's birth certificate, dated November 5, 1964 (left), an affidavit correcting her middle name from Iyer to Devi, dated February 18, 1965 (right).

Harris' mother, Shyamala Gopalan, was a biologist whose work on the progesterone receptor gene stimulated advances in breast cancer research. Shyamala had moved to the United States from India as a 19-year-old graduate student in 1958. After studying nutrition and endocrinology at the University of California, Berkeley, she received her Ph.D. in 1964.

Kamala Harris's father, Donald J. Harris, arrived in the United States from Jamaica in 1961, for graduate study at UC Berkeley, and received a Ph.D. in economics in 1966. Donald Harris and Shyamala Gopalan met in 1962 and were married in 1963. He would become a Stanford University professor of economics in 1972.

Her parents' home at the time of her birth (and hence, her first home as an infant) was a two-story L-shaped apartment building built in 1946 on Regent Street between Dwight Way and Parker Street—just east of the Telegraph Avenue district in Berkeley's Southside neighborhood.

In 1966, the Harris family moved to Champaign, Illinois (where Kamala's younger sister Maya was born), when her parents took positions at the University of Illinois. The family moved around the Midwest, with both parents working at multiple universities in succession over a brief period. Kamala, along with her mother and sister, moved back to California in 1970, while her father remained in the Midwest. They stayed briefly on Milvia Street in central Berkeley, then at a duplex on Bancroft Way in West Berkeley, an area often called the "flatlands" with a significant Black population. When Harris began kindergarten, she was bused as part of Berkeley's comprehensive desegregation program to Thousand Oaks Elementary School, a public school in a more prosperous neighborhood in northern Berkeley which previously had been 95 percent white, and after the desegregation plan went into effect became 40 percent Black. Harris's parents divorced when she was seven, with her mother maintaining custody.

African-American intellectuals and rights advocates constituted Harris's formative surroundings; Mary Lewis, who helped start the field of African-American studies at San Francisco State University, and taught there for many years, was one of Shyamala Gopalan's most trusted friends. When Shyamala worked late at her lab, Kamala was cared for by Regina Shelton, a Black woman whose day-care center in the apartment below was decorated with pictures of Harriet Tubman and Sojourner Truth.

Harris has written that Shyamala "knew that her adopted homeland would see Maya and me as Black girls, and she was determined to make sure we would grow into confident, proud Black women." A neighbor regularly took the Harris girls to an African American church in Oakland where they sang in the children's choir, and the girls and their mother also frequently visited a nearby African American cultural center. Their mother introduced them to Hinduism and took them to a nearby Hindu temple, where Shyamala occasionally sang. As children, she and her sister visited their mother's family in Madras (now Chennai) on occasion. Kamala Harris says she was impressed by her maternal grandfather's progressive views. Harris has remained in touch with her Indian aunts and uncles. The two Harris sisters spent summers with their father in Palo Alto and now and then traveled to Jamaica with him.

When she was twelve, Harris and her sister moved with their mother to Montreal, Quebec, Canada where Shyamala had accepted a research and teaching position at the McGill University-affiliated Jewish General Hospital. Harris attended a French-speaking primary school, Notre-Dame-des-Neiges, then F.A.C.E. School, and finally Westmount High School (Note: Harris has said she struggled with understanding her French immersion, so her mother sent her to an English-speaking school for high school. This would no longer have been possible the next year, when Quebec passed a law requiring all immigrants who did not previously have English schooling in Quebec to enroll their children in French-speaking schools.) in Westmount, Quebec, graduating in 1981. There, a friend confided to Harris that she had been sexually abused in her home. Hearing of her schoolmate's experience helped form Harris's later commitment as a prosecutor to protect women and children. During her period in Montreal Harris has stated she learned "some" French.

== Higher education ==
After high school, Harris attended Vanier College in Montreal in 1981–1982. She then attended Howard University, a historically black university in Washington, D.C., living initially in a dorm room at Eton Tower near Thomas Circle. After her freshman year, in the summer of 1983, Harris worked at a McDonald's restaurant in Alameda, California. While at Howard, she interned as a mailroom clerk for California senator Alan Cranston, chaired the economics society, led the debate team, and joined Alpha Kappa Alpha sorority. She also completed a summer internship at the Federal Trade Commission, worked as a tour guide at the Bureau of Engraving and Printing, and participated in anti-apartheid protests at the South African embassy and National Mall. Harris graduated in 1986 with a degree in political science and economics.

Harris then returned to California to attend the University of California, Hastings College of the Law (later renamed in 2023 to the University of California College of the Law, San Francisco) through its Legal Education Opportunity Program (LEOP). While at UC Hastings, she served as president of its chapter of the Black Law Students Association. She graduated with a Juris Doctor in 1989 and was admitted to the California Bar in June 1990.

== Early career ==
=== Alameda County Deputy District Attorney ===
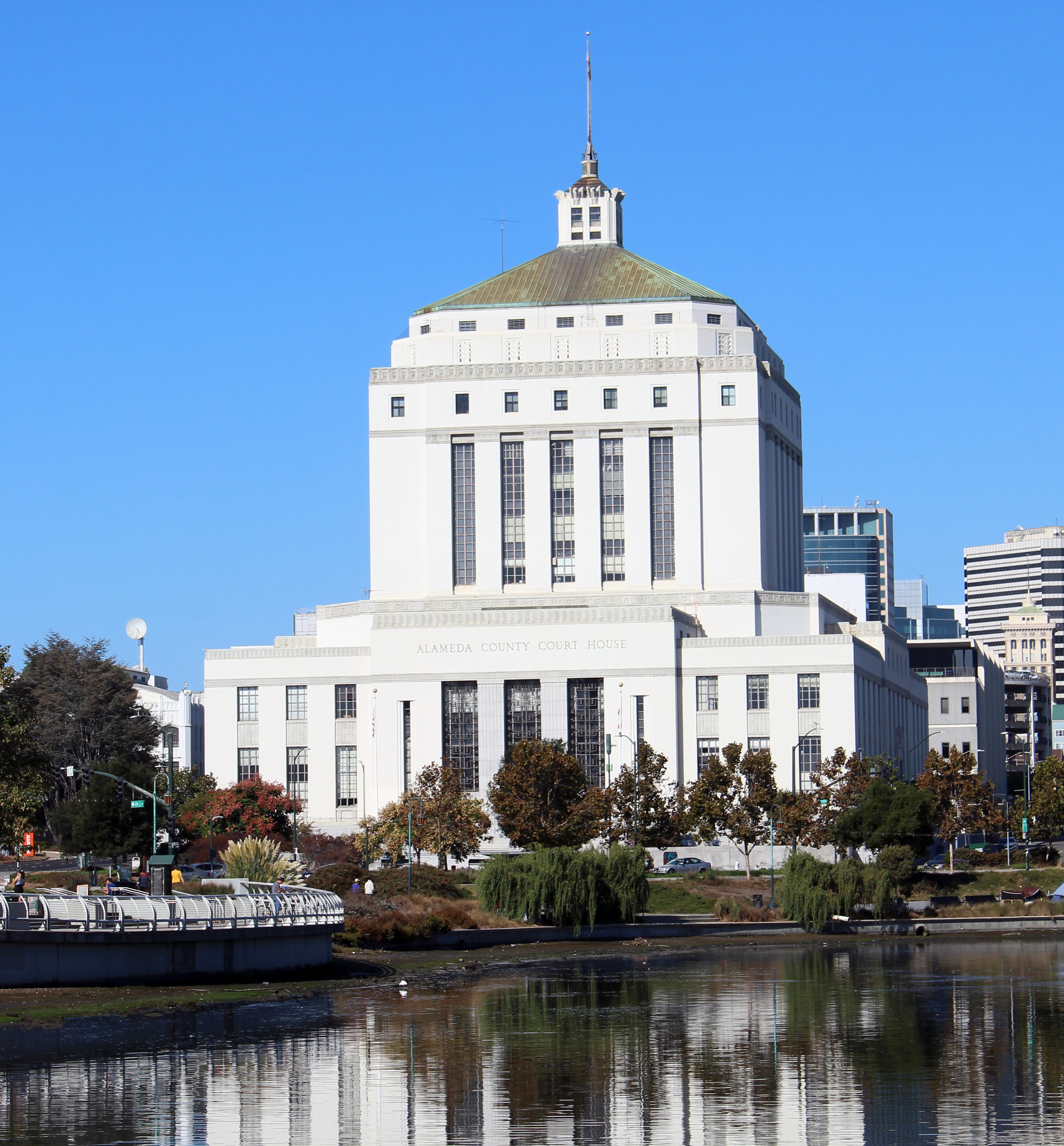
The René C. Davidson Courthouse in Oakland, where Harris was a summer intern with the Alameda County District Attorney's office in 1988

In 1990, Harris was hired as a deputy district attorney in Alameda County, California, where she was described as "an able prosecutor on the way up". In her 2019 memoir, she recalled stating her appearance for the People of the State of California before the Alameda County Superior Court at her first trial as a prosecutor: "Kamala Harris, for the people". "For the people" became the title of the first chapter of her 2019 memoir and the slogan of her 2020 presidential campaign.

In 1994, Speaker of the California Assembly Willie Brown, who was then dating Harris, appointed her to the state Unemployment Insurance Appeals Board and later to the California Medical Assistance Commission. Harris took a six-month leave of absence in 1994 from her duties, then afterward resumed working as prosecutor during the years she sat on the boards. Harris's connection to Brown was noted in media reportage as part of a pattern of California political leaders appointing "friends and loyal political soldiers" to lucrative positions on the commissions. Harris has defended her work.

=== San Francisco County Assistant District Attorney ===
In February 1998, San Francisco District Attorney Terence Hallinan recruited Harris as an assistant district attorney. There she became the chief of the Career Criminal Division, supervising five other attorneys, where she prosecuted homicide, burglary, robbery, and sexual assault cases – particularly three-strikes cases.

In 2000, Harris reportedly clashed with Hallinan's assistant, Darrell Salomon, over Proposition 21, which granted prosecutors the option of trying juvenile defendants in Superior Court rather than juvenile courts. Harris campaigned against the measure, which passed. Salomon opposed directing media inquiries about Prop 21 to Harris and reassigned her, a de facto demotion. Harris filed a complaint against Salomon and quit.

=== San Francisco City Attorney's Office ===
In August 2000, Harris took a job at San Francisco City Hall, working for City Attorney Louise Renne. Harris ran the Family and Children's Services Division representing child abuse and neglect cases. Renne endorsed Harris during her D.A. campaign.

== District Attorney of San Francisco ==
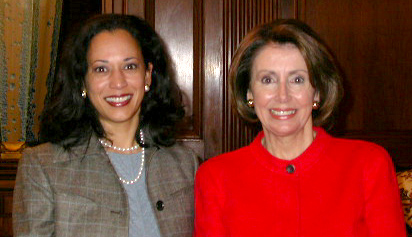
Harris with California representative Nancy Pelosi in 2004

In 2002, Harris prepared to run for District Attorney of San Francisco against Hallinan (the incumbent) and Bill Fazio. Harris was the least-known of the three candidates but persuaded the Central Committee to withhold its endorsement from Hallinan. Harris and Hallinan advanced to the general election runoff with 33 and 37 percent of the vote, respectively. Ahead of the election, Harris adopted the Chinese name He Jinli, (Note: simplified Chinese: 贺锦丽; traditional Chinese: 賀錦麗; pinyin: Hè Jǐnlì; Jyutping: Ho6 Gam2-lai5, also transliterated from Cantonese as Ho Gam-lai) as was common among non-Chinese politicians in San Francisco at the time due to the city's high Chinese population. Harris was advised by friend Julie D. Soo to adopt the name rather than Chinese-script transcription Kamala Halisi, (Note: simplified Chinese: 卡玛拉·哈里斯; traditional Chinese: 卡瑪拉·哈里斯; pinyin: Kǎmǎlā Hālǐsī; Jyutping: Kaa1-maa5-laai1 Haa1-lei5-si1) and was given the name by Chinatown community leader Stephen Soo (Julie Soo's father). The younger Soo told the South China Morning Post in 2020 that she had told Harris to take the name during the election in order to increase her representation in Chinese-language media and avoid a meaningless or offensive-sounding name that could emerge through transcription of her name into Chinese characters. Harris's usage of a Chinese name was not without controversy; the San Francisco Chronicle criticised her in 2016 for taking "major liberties" rather than directly transcribing her name.

In the runoff, Harris pledged never to seek the death penalty and to prosecute three-strike offenders only in cases of violent felonies. Harris ran a "forceful" campaign, assisted by former mayor Willie Brown, Senator Dianne Feinstein, writer and cartoonist Aaron McGruder, and comedians Eddie Griffin and Chris Rock. Harris differentiated herself from Hallinan by attacking his performance. She argued that she left his office because it was technologically inept, emphasizing his 52-percent conviction rate for serious crimes despite an 83-percent average conviction rate statewide. Harris charged that his office was not doing enough to stem the city's gun violence, particularly in poor neighborhoods like Bayview and the Tenderloin, and attacked his willingness to accept plea bargains in cases of domestic violence. Harris won with 56 percent of the vote, becoming the first person of color elected as district attorney of San Francisco.

Harris ran unopposed for a second term in November 2007.

=== Public safety ===
==== Non-violent crimes ====
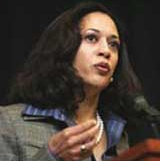
Harris as San Francisco district attorney

In the summer of 2005, Harris created an environmental crimes unit. Also in 2005, the National Black Prosecutors Association awarded Harris the Thurgood Marshall Award.

In 2007, Harris and city attorney Dennis Herrera investigated San Francisco supervisor Ed Jew for violating residency requirements necessary to hold his supervisor position; Harris charged Jew with nine felonies, alleging that he had lied under oath and falsified documents to make it appear he resided in a Sunset District home, necessary so he could run for supervisor in the 4th district. Jew pleaded guilty in October 2008 to unrelated federal corruption charges (mail fraud, soliciting a bribe, and extortion) and pleaded guilty the following month in state court to a charge of perjury for lying about his address on nomination forms, as part of a plea agreement in which the other state charges were dropped and Jew agreed to never again hold elected office in California. Harris described the case as "about protecting the integrity of our political process, which is part of the core of our democracy". For his federal offenses, Jew was sentenced to 64 months in federal prison and a $10,000 fine; for the state perjury conviction, Jew was sentenced to one year in county jail, three years' probation, and about $2,000 in fines.

Under Harris, the D.A.'s office obtained more than 1,900 felony and misdemeanor convictions for marijuana offenses, including persons simultaneously convicted of marijuana offenses and more serious crimes. The rate at which Harris's office prosecuted marijuana crimes was higher than the rate under Hallinan, but the total number of arrests made was significantly lower, and the number of defendants sentenced to state prison for such offenses was substantially lower. Prosecutions for low-level marijuana offenses were rare under Harris, and her office had a policy of not pursuing jail time for marijuana possession offenses. Harris's successor as D.A., George Gascón, expunged all San Francisco marijuana offenses going back to 1975.

Harris has expressed support for San Francisco's sanctuary city policy of not inquiring about immigration status in the process of a criminal investigation.

==== Violent crimes ====
In the early 2000s, the San Francisco murder rate per capita outpaced the national average. Within the first six months of taking office, Harris cleared 27 of 74 backlogged homicide cases by settling 14 by plea bargain and taking 11 to trial; of those trials, nine ended with convictions and two with hung juries. She took 49 violent crime cases to trial and secured 36 convictions. From 2004 to 2006, Harris achieved an 87-percent conviction rate for homicides and a 90-percent conviction rate for all felony gun violations.

Harris also pushed for higher bail for criminal defendants involved in gun-related crimes, arguing that historically low bail encouraged outsiders to commit crimes in San Francisco. SFPD officers credited Harris with tightening the loopholes defendants had used in the past. In addition to creating a gun crime unit, Harris opposed releasing defendants on their own recognizance if they were arrested on gun crimes, sought minimum 90-day sentences for possession of concealed or loaded weapons, and charged all assault weapons possession cases as felonies, adding that she would seek prison terms for criminals who possessed or used assault weapons and would seek maximum penalties on gun-related crimes.

Harris created a Hate Crimes Unit, focusing on hate crimes against LGBT children and teens in schools. In early 2006, Gwen Araujo, a 17-year-old American Latina transgender teenager, was murdered by two men who later used the "gay panic defense" before being convicted of second-degree murder. Harris, alongside Araujo's mother Sylvia Guerrero, convened a two-day conference of at least 200 prosecutors and law enforcement officials nationwide to discuss strategies to counter such legal defenses. Harris subsequently supported A.B. 1160, the Gwen Araujo Justice for Victims Act, advocating that California's penal code include jury instructions to ignore bias, sympathy, prejudice, or public opinion in making their decision, also making mandatory for district attorney's offices in California to educate prosecutors about panic strategies and how to prevent bias from affecting trial outcomes. In September 2006, California governor Arnold Schwarzenegger signed A.B. 1160 into law; the law put California on record as declaring it contrary to public policy for defendants to be acquitted or convicted of a lesser included offense on the basis of appeals to "societal bias".

In August 2007, state assemblyman Mark Leno introduced legislation to ban gun shows at the Cow Palace, joined by Harris, police chief Heather Fong, and mayor Gavin Newsom. City leaders contended the shows were directly contributing to the proliferation of illegal guns and spiking homicide rates in San Francisco. (Earlier that month Newsom had signed into law local legislation banning gun shows on city and county property.) Leno alleged that merchants drove through the public housing developments nearby and illegally sold weapons to residents. While the bill would stall, local opposition to the shows continued until the Cow Palace Board of Directors in 2019 voted to approve a statement banning all future gun shows.

=== Reform efforts ===
==== Death penalty ====
During her campaign, Harris pledged never to seek the death penalty. After a San Francisco Police Department officer, Isaac Espinoza, was shot and killed in 2004, U.S. senator (and former San Francisco mayor) Dianne Feinstein, U.S. senator Barbara Boxer, Oakland mayor Jerry Brown, and the San Francisco Police Officers Association pressured Harris to reverse that position, but she did not. (Polls found that seventy percent of voters supported Harris's decision.) When Edwin Ramos, an illegal immigrant and alleged MS-13 gang member, was accused of murdering a man and his two sons in 2009, Harris sought a sentence of life in prison without parole, a decision Mayor Gavin Newsom backed.

==== Recidivism and re-entry initiative ====
In 2004, Harris recruited civil rights activist Lateefah Simon to create the San Francisco Reentry Division. The flagship program was the Back on Track initiative, a first-of-its-kind reentry program for first-time nonviolent offenders aged 18–30. Initiative participants whose crimes were not weapon- or gang-related would plead guilty in exchange for a deferral of sentencing and regular appearances before a judge over a twelve- to eighteen-month period. The program maintained rigorous graduation requirements, mandating completion of up to 220 hours of community service, obtaining a high-school-equivalency diploma, maintaining steady employment, taking parenting classes, and passing drug tests. At graduation, the court would dismiss the case and expunge the graduate's record.

Over six years, the 200 people graduated from the program had a recidivism rate of less than ten percent, compared to the 53 percent of California's drug offenders who returned to prison within two years of release. Back on Track earned recognition from the U.S. Department of Justice as a model for reentry programs. The DOJ found that the cost to the taxpayers per participant was markedly lower ($5,000) than the cost of adjudicating a case ($10,000) and housing a low-level offender ($50,000). In 2009, a state law (the Back on Track Reentry Act, A.B. 750) was enacted, encouraging other California counties to start similar programs. Adopted by the National District Attorneys Association as a model, prosecutor offices in Baltimore, Philadelphia, and Atlanta have used Back on Track as a template for their own programs.

==== Truancy initiative ====
In 2006, as part of an initiative to reduce the city's skyrocketing homicide rate, Harris led a city-wide effort to combat truancy for at-risk elementary school youth in San Francisco. Declaring chronic truancy a matter of public safety and pointing out that the majority of prison inmates and homicide victims are dropouts or habitual truants, Harris's office met with thousands of parents at high-risk schools and sent out letters warning all families of the legal consequences of truancy at the beginning of the fall semester, adding she would prosecute the parents of chronically truant elementary students; penalties included a $2,500 fine and up to a year in jail. The program was controversial when introduced.

In 2008, Harris issued citations against six parents whose children missed at least fifty days of school, the first time San Francisco prosecuted adults for student truancy. San Francisco's school chief, Carlos Garcia, said the path from truancy to prosecution was lengthy, and that the school district usually spends months encouraging parents through phone calls, reminder letters, private meetings, hearings before the School Attendance Review Board, and offers of help from city agencies and social services; two of the six parents entered no plea but said they would work with the D.A.'s office and social service agencies to create "parental responsibility plans" to help them start sending their children to school regularly. By April 2009, 1,330 elementary school students were habitual or chronic truants, down 23 percent from 1,730 in 2008, and down from 2,517 in 2007 and from 2,856 in 2006. Harris's office prosecuted seven parents in three years, with none jailed.
