= EIMS =

EIMS may refer to:

- École internationale de Montréal (Secondaire), a high school in Westmount, Quebec, Canada
- Eudora Internet Mail Server

== See also ==
- EIM (disambiguation)
