= Centre de services scolaire de Montréal =

Canadian school district serving part of the island of Montreal

Location
- 5100, Rue Sherbrooke East, Montreal, Quebec H1V 3R9 Montreal Canada
- Coordinates: 45.54975°N 73.55504°W

District information
- Schools: 129 elementary schools, 37 secondary schools, 13 adult education centres, and 9 vocational training centres and 28 schooling service centres.
- Budget: CA$784,000,000 (2006-2007)

Students and staff
- Students: 109,000
- Staff: 17,000

Other information
- Website: www.cssdm.gouv.qc.ca

The Centre de services scolaire de Montréal (CSSDM, or Montreal school services centre)) is one of three French-language school service centres located in Montreal, Quebec, Canada, appointed by the Ministry of Education.

The CSSDM operates 129 elementary schools, 37 secondary schools, 13 adult education centres, and 9 vocational training centres and 28 schooling service centres.

== History ==
On June 15, 2020, it replaced the former elected Commission scolaire de Montréal (Montreal school commission or school board), which was created on July 1, 1998, as a result of a law passed by the Quebec government that changed the school board system from denominational to linguistic. Its main predecessor is the Montreal Catholic School Commission (Commission des écoles catholiques de Montréal or CÉCM) which was composed of both French and English Roman Catholic schools and had been in operation for over 150 years.

In January 2021, the Quebec government announced that it had ordered an inquiry into the CSSDM.

== List of schools ==
=== Elementary schools ===
- École Barclay
- École Bedford
- École Champlain
- École Des Cinq-Continents
- École Des Nations
- École du Petit-Chapiteau
- École Élan
- École FACE (Also a High School)
- École Félix-Leclerc
- École François de Laval et annexe
- École Garneau
- École Iona
- École Jean-Baptiste-Meilleur
- École Lanaudière
- École Laurier
- École Le Plateau
- École Les-Enfants-Du-Monde
- École Louis-Hippolyte-Lafontaine
- École Lucille-Teasdale
- École Marc-Favreau
- École Marguerite-Bourgeoys
- École Marie-Favery
- École Montcalm
- Ecole Nazareth
- École Notre-Dame-des-Neiges
- École Philipe-Labarre
- École Saint-Anselme
- École Saint-Enfant-Jésus
- École Sainte-Lucie
- École Saint-Louis-de-Gonzague
- École Saint-Pascal-Baylon
- École Saint-Pierre-Claver
- École Simonne-Monet
- École Maisonneuve
- École Baril
- École Saint-Bernardin
- École Saint-Nom-de-Jésus
- École Saint-François-d’Assise
- École Saint-Barthélemy (Pavillon des Érables et pavillon Sagard
- École Internationale de Montréal (primaire)
- École internationale la Vérendry

=== High schools ===
- Académie Dunton
- Académie de Roberval
- École Chomedey-De Maisonneuve
- École de la Lancée
- École de la Source
- École Édouard-Montpetit
- École Espace-Jeunesse
- École secondaire Eulalie-Durocher
- École Eurêka
- École Évangeline (EVLA - 2e cycle du secondaire)
- École FACE
- École Georges-Vanier
- École Honoré-Mercier
- École internationale de Montréal
- École Irénée-Lussier
- École Jeanne-Mance
- École Joseph-Charbonneau
- École secondaire Joseph-François-Perrault
- École La Dauversière (EVLA - 1er cycle du secondaire)
- École le Tremplin
- École le Vitrail
- École La Voie
- École Louis-Joseph-Papineau
- École Louis-Riel
- École Louise-Trichet
- École Lucien-Pagé
- École secondaire Marguerite-De Lajemmerais
- École secondaire Marie-Anne
- École Père-Marquette
- École Rosalie-Jetté
- École Robert-Gravel
- École Saint-Henri
- École Saint-Louis
- École Saint-Luc
- École Sophie-Barat
