= Journal of Electrical Bioimpedance =

- Discipline: Bioimpedance
- Language: English
- Edited by: Ørjan G. Martinsen

Publication details
- History: 2010; 16 years ago – present
- Publisher: De Gruyter on behalf of the Oslo Bioimpedance Group
- Frequency: Continuous
- Open access: Yes
- License: Creative Commons Attribution

Standard abbreviations
- ISO 4: J. Electr. Bioimpedance

Indexing
- ISSN: 1891-5469
- OCLC no.: 681320528

Links
- Journal homepage; Online access; Online archive

The Journal of Electrical Bioimpedance is an open access scientific journal that was established in 2010 and is published by the Oslo Bioimpedance Group with assistance of the University of Oslo Library. The editor-in-chief is Ørjan G. Martinsen (University of Oslo). The journal publishes reviews, articles, and educational material covering research on all aspects of bioimpedance. It is abstracted and indexed in Scopus and PubMed Central.
