= EIM =

EIM may refer to:

- EIM (video game developer)
- École internationale de Montréal, a high school in Westmount, Quebec, Canada
- Electrical impedance myography
- Engineering information management
- Enterprise information management
- European Rail Infrastructure Managers
- Exercise is Medicine, a program of the American Medical Association
- Extensor indicis muscle
- IBM Enterprise Identity Mapping
- Nina Eim (born 1998), German triathlete
