= Montreal School Board (disambiguation) =

Montreal School Board can refer to

- Commission scolaire de Montréal, the French language school board
- English Montreal School Board, the English language school board
