= Académie de Roberval =

Location
- 1275 Rue Jarry E Montreal, Quebec, H2P 1W9; Canada; 45.546364°N 73.610522°W

Information
- School type: Public, high school
- School district: Commission scolaire de Montréal
- Principal: Mr. Bruno Laberge
- Enrollment: 602
- Public transit access: Jarry’s subway station

Académie de Roberval is a small French high school located in Montreal, Quebec containing approximately 600 students. It is a part of the Centre de services scolaire de Montréal (CSSDM).

== Information ==
- Académie de Roberval is a school with an enriched educational project. Whether by offering enrichment in all subjects, or in special programs such as Latin and methodology. Académie de Roberval has a specific educational project.
- The Académie de Roberval, which is located on the edge of the Villeray and Saint-Michel districts, is a five-minute walk from the Jarry metro station.
- Students are admitted to this free public school after passing an exam.
- The Academy is located since January 2018 at 1205 Rue Jarry Est. It was for several problems (mold, heating, plumbing, etc.) that the school had to move.

== Enriched program ==
The program offered by the Académie de Roberval is a program enriched with subjects such as Latin (offered to secondary 1 and 2 students), Spanish (offered to secondary 3 students) cinema (offered to secondary 4 students and 5) which is an optional course offered only at the Academy, and many other options such as Entrepreneurship or Personal Orientation Project (PPO). In addition, an English first language course is offered to English-speaking or fluent English-speaking students. The two mathematical sequences are offered to students (CST, SN) with six lessons per nine-day cycle. Since fall 2013, integrative project (IP) and community engagement courses have been offered outside of the schedule.

== Board ==
Since 2012, the director of Académie de Roberval has been Mrs. Luisa Cordoba and her assistant is Bruno Laberge. During the last decades, the status of the school has changed enormously.

From January 2018 to July 2019, the director of the Academy was Jaziel Petrone and his assistant was still Bruno Laberge.

In August 2019, Mr. Laberge became director and Marie-Claude Bachand his assistant.

== Address change ==
In December 2017, the school building closed due to mold. The old school building was located at 1385 Rue de Castelnau E, behind the Jean-Talon Hospital and near the Fabre metro station. Since then, the school has not finished the planned work with a budget of $ 14.5 million.
