= Paul VI High School (Montreal) =

Coordinates: 45°34′1″N 73°38′54″W

Location
- 9905 Papineau Street; Montreal, Quebec, H2B 1Z9; Canada

Information
- School type: Public, Special needs secondary school
- Founded: 1979
- School board: English Montreal School Board
- Principal: Roland Desloges
- Grades: 7-11
- Language: English

Paul VI High School (French: École secondaire Paul VI) is a high school located in Montreal, Quebec, Canada. It is a part of the English Montreal School Board.

Prior to 1998 it was operated by the Montreal Catholic School Commission.
