= Jean-Guy Deschamps =

Jean-Guy Deschamps (1942 – 20 February 2024) is a former politician in Montreal, Quebec, Canada. He served on the Montreal city council from 1994 to 2001 as a member of Vision Montreal and was also an elected commissioner on the Montreal Catholic School Commission (MCSC) from 1977 to 1994.

== Private life and school commissioner ==
Deschamps worked as an insurance broker in private life. He was elected as a commissioner for the MCSC's tenth ward in the 1977 school board elections, as a candidate of the conservative Movement scolaire confessionnel (MSC), and was re-elected in 1980, 1983, 1987, and 1990. The MSC was the dominant political force in the MCSC during this period, and Deschamps was aligned with the commission's leadership.

In June 1986, a Quebec Superior Court judge questioned the "motives and objectivity" of three school commissioners, including Deschamps, who had voted to switch construction contracts from two firms to three other companies. The judge specifically criticized what he described as "the narrowness and the chauvinism" of Deschamps's motives.

== City councillor ==
Deschamps was first elected to Montreal city council in the 1994 municipal election for the east-end division of Tétreaultville. Vision Montreal won a majority of council seats in this election, and Deschamps served as a backbench supporter of Pierre Bourque's administration.

Deschamps held the largely ceremonial position of "pro-mayor" for a six-month term in early 1997. Beginning in January of that year, Bourque's leadership came under serious threat from dissident members of Vision Montreal; had he been forced to resign, Deschamps would have ascended to the position of mayor on a temporary basis. In the event, Bourque was able to secure his position and remained as mayor.

In February 1997, Bourque appointed Deschamps to the city's economic development committee. Later in the year, after his term as pro-mayor had ended, rumours circulated that Deschamps was considering resigning from Vision Montreal. He ultimately remained a member and was re-elected under its banner in the 1998 municipal election.

Vision Montreal won a second consecutive majority in the 1998 election, and Deschamps continued to serve as a backbench supporter of Bourque's administration. He did not seek re-election in 2001.

== Electoral record ==
1998 Montreal municipal election: City Councillor, Tétreauville
Party	Candidate	Votes	%	±%
Vision Montreal	Jean-Guy Deschamps (incumbent)	3,605	54.60	
New Montreal	Jacques Gendron	1,511	22.89	
Montreal Citizens' Movement	Danielle Biron	906	13.72	
Team Montreal	Arthur Prince	580	8.79	
Total valid votes		6,602	100	
Source: Municipal Election Results (1998), City of Montreal.

1994 Montreal municipal election: City Councillor, Tétreauville
Party	Candidate	Votes	%	±%
Vision Montreal	Jean-Guy Deschamps	3,465	55.03	
Montreal Citizens' Movement	Nicole Milhomme (incumbent)	1,846	29.32	
Independent	Joseph Salerno	804	12.77	
Democratic Coalition–Ecology Montreal	Sylvain Lapalme	181	2.87	
Total valid votes		6,296	100	
Source: Municipal Election Results (1843–2005), City of Montreal.

Montreal Catholic School Commission election, 1990: Commissioner, Ward Ten
Party	Candidate	Votes	%
Movement scolaire confessionnel	Jean-Guy Deschamps (incumbent)	elected	
Source: "Board election results," Montreal Gazette, 19 November 1990, A4.

Montreal Catholic School Commission election, 1987: Commissioner, Ward Ten
Party	Candidate	Votes	%
Movement scolaire confessionnel	Jean-Guy Deschamps (incumbent)	2,408	66.56
-	Jean Quintal	1,210	33.44
Total valid votes		3,618	100
Source: "Winners of election for boards on island," Montreal Gazette, 16 November 1987, A6.

Montreal Catholic School Commission election, 1983: Commissioner, Ward Ten
Party	Candidate	Votes	%
Movement scolaire confessionnel	Jean-Guy Deschamps (incumbent)		76
Source: "Nouvelle victoire du MSC à la CECM," Le Devoir, 14 June 1983, A1.

Montreal Catholic School Commission election, 1980: Commissioner, Ward Ten
Party	Candidate	Votes	%
Movement scolaire confessionnel	Jean-Guy Deschamps (incumbent)	2,435	68.42
Supported by the Association provincial des enseignants catholiques	Albert Berardinucci	1,124	33.44
Total valid votes		3,559	100
Sources: Le Devoir, 6 June 1980, p. 2; Le Devoir, 10 June 1980, p. 1; Montreal Gazette, 11 June 1980, p. 118.

Montreal Catholic School Commission election, 1977: Commissioner, Ward Ten
Party	Candidate	Votes	%
Movement scolaire confessionnel	Jean-Guy Deschamps	elected	
Independent	John Galipeau		
Independent	Andre Cote		
Sources: Le Devoir, 7 June 1977, p. 3 (party affiliations); Montreal Star, 14 June 1977, A10.
