= École secondaire Sophie-Barat =

Ecole secondaire Sophie-Barat

Location
- 1239, boulevard Gouin Est; Montreal, Quebec, H2C 1B3; Canada
- Coordinates: 45.56225°N 73.66768°W

Information
- School type: Public
- Founded: 1859
- School board: Centre de services scolaire de Montréal
- Principal: Mme Sabine Posso
- Grades: 7–11
- Enrollment: 1775 (2025)
- Language: French
- Area: Montreal
- Colours: Blue; Green; White
- Team name: Phénix
- Website: sophie-barat.cssdm.gouv.qc.ca
- Last updated: March 12, 2021

École secondaire Sophie-Barat is a Francophone public co-educational secondary school located in the Ahuntsic-Cartierville borough in Montreal, Quebec. Part of the Centre de services scolaire de Montréal (CSSDM), it was originally in the Catholic School board Commission des écoles catholiques de Montréal (CECM) before the 1998 reorganization of School boards from religious communities into linguistic communities in Quebec. In 2019, the school has 1,666 students and 115 teachers.

== History ==
This establishment is the oldest of the CSSDM. Between 1856 and 1858, the Dames du Sacré-Coeur erected the Pensionnat du Sacré-Coeur devoted to the young girls of the francophone bourgeoisie. Destroyed by fire in 1929, the building was reconstructed in 1930. In 1970, the building was sold and became the French public secondary mixed school École secondaire Sophie-Barat.

== The School ==
The establishment has four stories and contains mainly regular classrooms, rooms for computer labs, science labs, plastic art workshops, a music room, two canteens, a library and an auditorium. The school also comprises three gymnasiums and a swimming pool.

== Programs and services ==
Besides the regular program, the school offers specialized programs in science, literature, arts and social involvement.

Others professional services are offered to the students: psychoeducator, nurse, social worker, guidance counsellor, sports and leisure technician, special education technician, drug addiction worker, etc.

== Student life ==
=== Sports ===
- Active girls program
- Badminton
- Basketball
- Cheerleading
- Cosom Hockey
- Flag Football
- Futsal
- Handball
- Kickboxing
- Outdoor Club
- Ski trips
- Soccer
- Volley-ball
- Yoga

=== Culture ===
- Choir
- Cooking classes
- Hip-Hop
- Improvisational Theatre
- Latin dances
- Photo Club
- Pottery
- Theatre

=== Events ===
- Back-to-school Party
- Christmas Market
- Christmas Party
- Cultural trips
- Creation Night
- Exhibitions
- Graduation Ceremonies
- Green Classes
- Halloween
- Hiking trip
- Meritas Gala
- Movie Festival
- Music Festival
- Night under the tent
- Secondaire en spectacle program
- School Prom
- Shows
- Sophiestival
- Sports Gala
- Sugar shack trip

== Notable students ==
- Simon Cliche-Trudeau, better known under the stage name Loud, French-Canadian rapper
- Laurent Fortier-Brassard, better known under the stage name Lary Kidd, French-Canadian rapper
- Georcy-Stéphanie Thiffeault Picard, athlete at the 2016 Olympic games in Rio de Janeiro, Brasil.
