= École secondaire Joseph-François-Perrault =

Ecole secondaire Joseph-François-Perrault

Location
- 7450, rue François-Perrault; Montreal, Quebec, H2A 1L9; Canada; 45.56319°N 73.59982°W

Information
- School type: Public
- Founded: 1966
- School board: Centre de services scolaire de Montréal
- Principal: Mr. Eric Sirois
- Grades: 7–11
- Enrollment: 1,504 (2020)
- Language: French
- Area: Montreal
- Colours: Blue; White
- Team name: Tigres blancs
- Website: joseph-francois-perrault.cssdm.gouv.qc.ca
- Last updated: March 10, 2021

École secondaire Joseph-François-Perrault is a francophone public mixed secondary school in Montreal, Quebec, located in the heart of the Saint-Michel district in Villeray-Saint-Michel-Parc-Extension borough and operated by the Centre de services scolaire de Montréal (CSSDM).

The school was established in 1966. Its music program began in 1978, and it began offering the International Baccalaureate program in 1999. In 2020, it had 1,504 students and 101 teachers. It is the only school in Quebec to offer a parallel curriculum in Arts Studies-Classical Music with International Education Program.

Prior to 1998, it was operated by the Montreal Catholic School Commission (CECM).

== History ==
Established in 1966, the school was based on the concept of a school-park. The school was divided in three blocks with separated boys and girls aisle around a common space with services. The CECM considered at that time that it was the most modern school in Montreal.

== School and facilities ==
The school has 3 stories, is divided in 3 interrelated blocks and is located in the François-Perreault octagonal Park. The building is in multicolor brown bricks with prefabricated concrete insertions especially for openings like windows and doors. Other than classrooms, it contains an auditorium (200 seats), a cafeteria, computer labs, science labs, a gymnasium and soundproof cubicles for practicing music. Outdoor facilities, included in the school-park, are an exterior swimming pool, a soccer field, 4 tennis courts, 2 basketball courts and a hockey field.

== Student life ==
=== Events ===
- Apple-pick trip
- Environment (Bruntland Green Establishment);
- Noon Cinema;
- French Week;
- Gala Meritas;
- Graduation Ball;
- Music Month;
- Noon activities;
- Opti-math Concourse;
- Physical activities Month;
- Shows and concerts;
- Ski trips;
- Sugar schack trip;
- Thematic Week and Day;
- Young Democrats Tournament.

=== Sports ===
- Badminton;
- Basketball;
- Flag football;
- Cosom hockey;
- Ski trips
- Soccer;
- Volleyball.

=== Culture ===
- Génies en herbe
- Guitar course
- Harmony Band
- Improvisational Theatre
- Student Radio
- Theatre

== Notable students ==
- Marco Calliari, singer, song-writer and musician;
- Sylvie Fréchette, synchronized swimmer and Olympic medalist
- Josée Legault, author, journalist and political commentator
