= École secondaire Marie-Anne =

Ecole secondaire Marie-Anne

Location
- 100, rue Sauvé Est; Montreal, Quebec, H3L 1H1; Canada
- Coordinates: 45.54768°N 73.65864°W

Information
- School type: Public
- Founded: 1990
- School board: Centre de services scolaire de Montréal
- Principal: Mr. Antonino Papalia
- Grades: 9–11
- Enrollment: 756 (2019)
- Language: French
- Area: Montreal
- Website: www.marie-anne.cssdm.gouv.qc.ca
- Last updated: March 18, 2021

École secondaire Marie-Anne is a francophone public secondary mixed school located in the Ahuntsic-Cartierville borough in Montreal. Part of the Centre de services scolaire de Montréal (CSSDM), it was originally in the Commission des écoles catholiques de Montréal (CECM) before the 1998 reorganization of school boards from religious communities into linguistic communities in Quebec. In 2019, the school had 756 students.

== The school ==
The building is modern, has four stories with lots of windows, and is on a green land with trees. It contains mainly regular classrooms, rooms for computer labs, science labs, a cafeteria, a student café, a library, a weight room, a playroom, and an auditorium. The school also has a small gymnasium and, outside, three basketball courts.

A transition school of 27 classrooms will be constructed in 2023 on the property to host temporarily a total of 464 students.

== Programs and services ==
The school offers two programs for students from grade 9 to grade 11 for drop-outs students from 16 to 21 years old: a general education program or an applied general education program.

Professional services are offered to the students: specialized educators, psychoeducator, education specialist, resources teachers, nurse, guidance counsellor, etc.

== Activities ==
- Basketball
- Cosom hockey
- Environment club
- Graduation ceremony
- Kickboxing
- Movies
- Ping-pong
- Soccer
- Student radio
- Weight training
- Welcome Days
