= Bioelectrical impedance analysis =

Method for estimating body composition

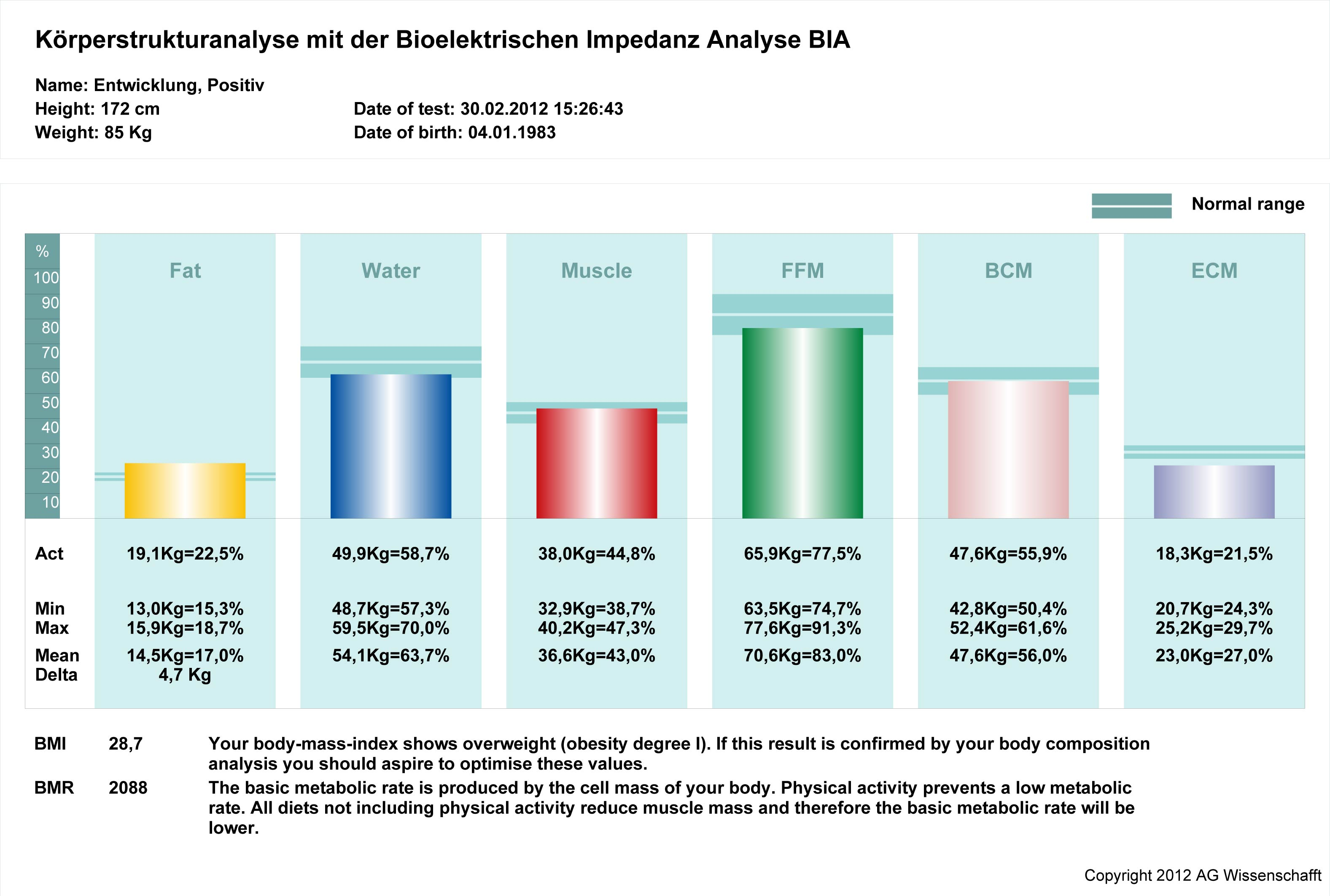
Example of a Bioelectrical Impedance Analysis (BIA)

Bioelectrical impedance analysis (BIA) is a method for estimating body composition where a weak electric current flows through the body, and the voltage is measured in order to calculate impedance (resistance and reactance) of the body. These measurements can be used to estimate body fat, body water, and muscle mass. The measurements also produce the electrical phase angle of the body.

== Principles of measurement ==
BIA actually determines the electrical impedance, or opposition to the flow of an electric current through body tissues. The impedance of cellular tissue can be modeled as a resistor (representing the extracellular path) in parallel with a resistor and capacitor in series (representing the intracellular path – the resistance that of intracellular fluid and the capacitor the cell membrane). This results in a change in impedance versus the frequency used in the measurement. Whole-body impedance is generally measured from the wrist to the ipsilateral ankle and uses either two (rarely) or four (overwhelmingly) electrodes. In the 2-electrode (bipolar) configuration a small current on the order of 1–10 μA is passed between two electrodes, and the voltage is measured between the same, whereas in the tetrapolar arrangement resistance is measured between as separate pair of proximally located electrodes. The tetrapolar arrangement is preferred, since measurement is not confounded by the impedance of the skin–electrode interface.

As a general principle, if a person is more muscular, the person will tend have more body water, which leads to lower impedance. Impedance is frequency-sensitive; at low frequency the electric current flows preferentially through extracellular water (ECW) only, while at high frequency the current can cross cell membranes and hence flows through total body water (TBW). In bioimpedance spectroscopy devices (BIS) resistance at zero and high frequency can be estimated and, at least theoretically, should provide the optimal predictors of ECW and TBW and hence body fat-free mass respectively. In practice, the improvement in accuracy is marginal. The use of multiple frequencies or BIS in specific BIA devices has been shown to have high correlation with DXA when measuring body fat percentage. The correlation with DXA can be as high as 99% when measuring fat-free mass, if strict guidelines are adhered to. It is important to recognize that correlation is not a measure of accuracy or method agreement, BIA methods typically exhibit 2 standard deviation (2SD) limits of agreement with reference methods (e.g., DXA, MRI or 4C model) of around ±10%.

== Phase angle ==
In bioelectrical impedance analysis in humans, an estimate of the phase angle can be obtained and is based on changes in resistance and reactance as alternating current passes through tissues, which causes a phase shift. A phase angle therefore exists for all frequencies of measurement although conventionally in BIA it is phase angle at a measurement frequency of 50 kHz that is considered. The measured phase angle therefore depends on several biological factors. Phase angle is greater in men than women and decreases with increasing age. It may be useful as an indicator for health screenings.

== Accuracy ==
It is the 4-compartment model (4C) (DXA and MRI are acceptable alternatives) – and not BIA – that is regarded as the reference method in body composition analysis. Early research studies showed that BIA was quite variable. Measurements can be affected by dehydration, meals and nutrition, exercise, body temperature, and electrode placement and procedure. Estimates of body composition also depend on assumptions about body structure based on provided height and weight, which may be inaccurate for obese subjects or specific populations. Consumer body fat scales tend to under-read body fat percentage by approximately 5 kg (±7 kg LoA) on average, despite showing a linear correlation with MRI-based measurements of 0.75 and 0.81 for females and males respectively. BIA is not considered sufficiently accurate for recording of single measurements of individuals, but it can be acceptable for measuring groups and also for tracking body composition in an individual over a period of time.

Dehydration is a recognized factor affecting BIA measurements, as it causes an increase in the body's electrical resistance, so has been measured to cause a 5 kg underestimation of fat-free mass i.e. an overestimation of body fat.

Body-fat measurements are lower when measurements are taken shortly after consumption of a meal, causing a variation between highest and lowest readings of body fat percentage taken throughout the day of up to 4.2% of body fat.

Moderate exercise before BIA measurements lead to an overestimation of fat-free mass and an underestimation of body fat percentage due to reduced impedance. For example, moderate intensity exercise for 90–120 minutes before BIA measurements causes nearly a 12 kg overestimation of fat-free mass, i.e. body fat is significantly underestimated. Therefore, it is recommended not to perform BIA for several hours after moderate or high-intensity exercise.

The two-electrode, e.g., foot-to-foot or hand-to-hand measurement, is generally found to be less accurate than 4-electrode methods (tetra-polar technique in which the current circuit is provided by a pair of distal electrodes with impedance measured, as the voltage drop between a separate pair of proximal electrodes). Multiple electrodes, typically eight, may be used located on the hands and feet, allowing measurement of the impedance of the individual body segments – arms, legs and torso. The advantage of the multiple electrode devices is that body segments may be measured simultaneously without the need to relocate electrodes. Results for some impedance instruments tested found poor limits of agreement and in some cases systematic bias in estimation of visceral fat percentage, but good accuracy in the prediction of resting energy expenditure (REE) when compared with more accurate whole-body magnetic resonance imaging (MRI) and dual-energy X-ray absorptiometry (DXA).

== History ==
The electrical properties of tissues have been described since 1872. These properties were further described for a wider range of frequencies on a larger range of tissues, including those that were damaged or undergoing change after death.

In 1962, Thomasset conducted the original studies using electrical impedance measurements as an index of total body water (TBW), using two subcutaneously inserted needles.

In 1969, Hoffer concluded that a whole-body impedance measurement could predict total body water. The equation (the squared value of height divided by impedance measurements of the right half of the body) showed a correlation coefficient of 0.92 with total body water. This equation, Hoffer proved, is known as the impedance index used in BIA.

In 1983, Nyober validated the use of whole body electrical impedance to assess body composition.

By the 1970s the foundations of BIA were established, including those that underpinned the relationships between the impedance and the body water content of the body. A variety of single-frequency BIA analyzers then became commercially available, such as RJL Systems and its first commercialized impedance meter. Consumer body fat meters or scales became commercially available in the mid-1980s, and were popular owing to the ease of use and portability of the equipment.

In the 1980s, Lukaski, Segal, and other researchers discovered that the use of a single frequency (50 kHz) in BIA assumed the human body to be a single cylinder, which created many technical limitations in BIA. The use of a single frequency was inaccurate for populations that did not have the standard body type. To improve the accuracy of BIA, researchers created empirical equations using empirical data (gender, age, ethnicity) to predict a user's body composition.

In 1986, Lukaski published empirical equations using the impedance index, body weight, and reactance.

In 1986, Kushner and Scholler published empirical equations using the impedance index, body weight, and gender.

However, empirical equations were only useful in predicting the average population's body composition and was inaccurate for medical purposes for populations with diseases. In 1992, Kushner proposed the use of multiple frequencies to increase the accuracy of BIA devices to measure the human body as 5 different cylinders (right arm, left arm, torso, right leg, left leg) instead of one. The use of multiple frequencies would also distinguish intracellular and extracellular water.

By the 1990s, the market included several multi-frequency analyzers and a couple of BIS devices. The use of BIA as a bedside method has increased because the equipment is portable and safe, the procedure is simple and noninvasive, and the results are reproducible and rapidly obtained. More recently, segmental BIA has been developed to overcome inconsistencies between resistance (R) and the body mass of the trunk.

In 1996, an eight-polar stand-on BIA device, InBody, that did not utilize empirical equations was created and was found to "offer accurate estimates of TBW and ECW in women without the need of population-specific formulas."

In 2018, AURA Devices released the fitness tracker AURA Band with built-in BIA.

In 2020 BIA became available for Apple Watch users with the accessory AURA Strap with built-in sensors.

By the early 2020’s smartwatches like the Samsung Galaxy Watch 4 contained built-in BIAs.

== See also ==
- Body fat percentage
- Impedance spectroscopy
- Electrical impedance tomography
- Electrical impedance myography
