= Electrical impedance myography =

- Purpose: assessment of muscle health(non invasive)

Electrical impedance myography, or EIM, is a non-invasive technique for the assessment of muscle health that is based on the measurement of the electrical impedance characteristics of individual muscles or groups of muscles. The technique has been used for the purpose of evaluating neuromuscular diseases both for their diagnosis and for their ongoing assessment of progression or with therapeutic intervention. Muscle composition and microscopic structure change with disease, and EIM measures alterations in impedance that occur as a result of disease pathology. EIM has been specifically recognized for its potential as an ALS biomarker (also known as a biological correlate or surrogate endpoint) by Prize4Life, a 501(c)(3) nonprofit organization dedicated to accelerating the discovery of treatments and cures for ALS. The $1M ALS Biomarker Challenge focused on identifying a biomarker precise and reliable enough to cut Phase II drug trials in half. The prize was awarded to Dr. Seward Rutkove, chief, Division of Neuromuscular Disease, in the Department of Neurology at Beth Israel Deaconess Medical Center and Professor of Neurology at Harvard Medical School, for his work in developing the technique of EIM and its specific application to ALS. It is hoped that EIM as a biomarker will result in the more rapid and efficient identification of new treatments for ALS. EIM has shown sensitivity to disease status in a variety of neuromuscular conditions, including radiculopathy, inflammatory myopathy, Duchenne muscular dystrophy, and spinal muscular atrophy.

In addition to the assessment of neuromuscular disease, EIM also has the prospect of serving as a convenient and sensitive measure of muscle condition. Work in aging populations and individuals with orthopedic injuries indicates that EIM is very sensitive to muscle atrophy and disuse and is conversely likely sensitive to muscle conditioning and hypertrophy. Work on mouse and rats models, including a study of mice on board the final Space Shuttle mission (STS-135), has helped to confirm this potential value.

== Underlying concepts ==
Interest in electrical impedance dates back to the turn of the 20th century, when physiologist Louis Lapicque postulated an elementary circuit to model membranes of nerve cells. Scientists experimented with variations on this model until 1940, when Kenneth Cole developed a circuit model that accounted for the impedance properties of both cell membranes and intracellular fluid.

Like all impedance-based methods, EIM hinges on a simplified model of muscle tissue as an RC circuit. This model attributes the resistive component of the circuit to the resistance of extracellular and intracellular fluids, and the reactive component to the capacitive effects of cell membranes. The integrity of individual cell membranes has a significant effect on the tissue's impedance; hence, a muscle's impedance can be used to measure the tissue's degradation in disease progression. In neuromuscular disease, a variety of factors can influence the compositional and micro structural aspects of muscle, including most notably muscle fiber atrophy and disorganization, the deposition of fat and connective tissues, as occurs in muscular dystrophy, and the presence of inflammation, among many other pathologies. EIM captures these changes in the tissue as a whole by measuring its impedance characteristics across multiple frequencies and at multiple angles relative to the major muscle fiber direction.

In EIM, impedance is separated into resistance and reactance, its real and imaginary components. From this, one can compute the muscle's phase, which represents the time-shift that a sinusoid undergoes when passing through the muscle. For a given resistance (R) and reactance (X), phase (θ) can be calculated. In current work, all three parameters appear to play important roles depending exactly on which diseases are being studied and how the technology is being applied.

EIM can also be impacted by the thickness of the skin and subcutaneous fat overlying a region of muscle. However, electrode designs can be created that can circumvent the effect to a large extent and thus still provide primary muscle data. Moreover, the use of multifrequency measurements can also assist with this process of disentangling the effects of fat from those of muscle. From this information, it also becomes possible to infer/calculate the approximate amount of fat overlying a muscle in a given region.

== Multifrequency measurements ==
Both resistance and reactance depend on the input frequency of the signal. Because changes in frequency shift the relative contributions of resistance (fluid) and reactance (membrane) to impedance, multifrequency EIM may allow a more comprehensive assessment of disease. Resistance, reactance, or phase can be plotted as a function of frequency to demonstrate the differences in frequency dependence between healthy and diseased groups. Diseased muscle exhibits an increase in reactance and phase with increasing frequency, while reactance and phase values of healthy muscle increase with frequency until 50–100 kHz, at which point they begin to decrease as a function of frequency. Frequencies ranging from 500 Hz to 2 MHz are used to determine the frequency spectrum for a given muscle.

== Muscle anisotropy ==
Electrical impedance of muscle tissue is anisotropic; current flowing parallel to muscle fibers flows differently from current flowing orthogonally across the fibers. Current flowing orthogonally across a muscle encounters more cell membranes, thus increasing resistance, reactance, and phase values. By taking measurements at different angles with respect to muscle fibers, EIM can be used to determine the anisotropy of a given muscle. Anisotropy tends to be shown either as a graph plotting resistance, reactance, or phase as a function of angle with respect to the direction of muscle fibers or as a ratio of transverse (perpendicular to fibers) measurement to longitudinal measurement (parallel to muscle fibers) of a given impedance factor.

Muscle anisotropy also changes with neuromuscular disease. EIM has shown a difference between anisotropy profiles of neuromuscular disease patients and healthy controls. In addition, EIM can use anisotropy to discriminate between myopathic and neurogenic disease. Different forms of neuromuscular disease have unique anisotropies. Myopathic disease is characterized by decreased anisotropy. Neurogenic disease produces a less predictable anisotropy. The angle of lowest phase may be shifted from the parallel position, and the anisotropy as a whole is often greater than that of a healthy control.

== Measurement approaches ==
In general, to apply the technique, a minimum of four surface electrodes are placed over the muscle of interest. A minute alternating current is applied across the outer two electrodes, and voltage signals are recorded by the inner electrodes. The frequency of the applied current and the relationship of the electrode array to the major muscle fiber direction is varied so that a full multifrequency and multidirectional assessment of the muscle can be achieved.

EIM has been performed with a number of different impedance analysis devices. Commercially available systems used for bioimpedance analysis, can be calibrated to measure impedance of individual muscles. A suitable impedance analyzer can also be custom built using a lock-in amplifier to produce the signal and a low-capacitance probe, such as the Tektronix P6243, to record voltages from the surface electrodes.

Such methods, however, are slow and clumsy to apply given the need for careful electrode positioning over a muscle of interest and the potential for misalignment of electrodes and inaccuracy. Accordingly, an initial hand-held system was constructed using multiple components with an electrode head that could be placed directly on the patient. The device featured an array of electrode plates, which could be selectively activated to perform impedance measurements in arbitrary orientations. The oscilloscopes were programmed to produce a compound sinusoid signal, which could be used to measure the impedance at multiple frequencies simultaneously via a Fast Fourier transform.

Since that initial system was created, other handheld commercial systems are being developed, such as Skulpt, for use in both neuromuscular disease assessment and for fitness monitoring, including the calculation of a muscle quality (or MQ) value. This latter value aims to provide an approximate assessment of the relative force-generating capacity of muscle for a given cross-sectional area of tissue. Muscle quality, for example, is a measure used in the assessment of sarcopenia.

== Comparison with standard bioelectrical impedance analysis ==
Standard bioelectrical impedance analysis (BIA), like EIM, also employs a weak, high frequency electric current to measure characteristics of the human body. In standard BIA, unlike EIM, electric current is passed between electrodes placed on the hands and feet, and the impedance characteristics of the entire current path are measured. Thus, the measured impedance characteristics are relatively nonspecific since they encompass much of the body including the entire length of the extremities, the chest, abdomen and pelvis; accordingly, only summary whole-body measures of lean body mass and % fat can be offered. Moreover, in BIA, current travels the path of least resistance, and thus any factors that alter the current path will cause variability in the data. For example, the expansion of large vessels (e.g., veins) with increasing hydration will offer a low-resistance path, and thus distorting the resulting data. In addition, changes in abdominal contents will similarly alter the data. Body position can also have substantial effects, with joint position contributing to variations in the data. EIM, in contrast, measures only the superficial aspects of individual muscles and is relatively unaffected by body or limb position or hydration status. The differences between EIM and standard BIA were exemplified in one study in amyotrophic lateral sclerosis (ALS) which showed that EIM was effectively able to track progression in 60 ALS patients whereas BIA was not.
