= École secondaire Marguerite-De Lajemmerais =

Location
- 5555, rue Sherbrooke Est; Montreal, Quebec, H1N 1A2; Canada; 45.57155°N 73.55134°W

Information
- School type: Public
- Founded: 1964
- School board: Centre de services scolaire de Montréal
- Principal: Mme. Karine Galipeau
- Grades: 7–11
- Enrollment: 1200 (2023)
- Language: French
- Area: Montreal
- Website: marguerite-de-lajemmerais.cssdm.gouv.qc.ca
- Last updated: March 13, 2021

École secondaire Marguerite-De Lajemmerais is a Francophone secondary public mixed school located in Rosemont-La Petite-Patrie borough in Montreal, Quebec. Part of the Centre de services scolaire de Montréal (CSSDM), it was originally in the catholic School board Commission des écoles catholiques de Montréal (CECM) before the 1998 reorganization of School boards from religious communities into linguistic communities in Quebec. In 2019, the school had 677 students.

Originally a girls' school, the school started admitting boys in September 2019 due to declining enrollment.

== History ==
Originally, this school was founded by the Sisters of Charity of Montreal, commonly known as the Grey Nuns of Montreal, to recruit and train future teachers and to pursue their charitable work. In 1967, the CECM bought the establishment to have a new secondary public school. The school was named in honor of Marguerite d’Youville who was named before Marguerite De Lajemmerais.

== The school ==
The establishment constructed in 1964 has three to six stories in a long straight shape in « I » connected with 4 irregular and asymmetric aisles. It also have an important canopy at the entrance and a curved mosaic in concrete above and a mosaic inside the entrance hall. The building has mainly light yellow, red and brown bricks with lots of windows in a modernist and functionalist style.

It contains mainly regular classrooms, rooms for computer labs, science labs, plastic art workshops, a music room, two cafeterias, a library, two gymnasiums, an auditorium and used to have a swimming pool that is now a new gymnasium. The school also comprises outdoor facilities such as a running track, a small soccer field and two tennis courts.

== Programs and services ==
Besides the regular program, the school offers specialized programs in mathematics and science, dramatic arts, guitar classic and plastic arts.

Others professional services are offered to the students: psychoeducator, nurse, guidance counsellor, leisure technician, documentation technician, special education technician, supervisors, etc.
