= École secondaire Eulalie-Durocher =

Ecole secondaire Eulalie-Durocher

Location
- 2455, rue Létourneux; Montreal, Quebec, H1V 2N9; Canada; 45.55494°N 73.54595°W

Information
- School type: Public
- Founded: 1961
- School board: Centre de services scolaire de Montréal
- Principal: Mrs. Amélie Girard
- Grades: 9–11
- Enrollment: 748 (2019)
- Language: French
- Area: Montreal
- Website: www.eulalie-durocher.cssdm.gouv.qc.ca
- Last updated: March 19, 2021

École secondaire Eulalie-Durocher is a francophone secondary public mixed school located in Mercier-Hochelaga-Maisonneuve borough in Montreal. Part of the Centre de services scolaire de Montréal (CSSDM), it was originally in the catholic School board Commission des écoles catholiques de Montréal (CECM) before the 1998 reorganization of School boards from religious communities into linguistic communities in Quebec. In 2019, the school has 748 students.

== History ==
First established in 1961, this school was constructed on a land of another school, the Académie La Salle, demolished by a fire in 1914.

The school is named in honor of Marie-Rose Durocher, born Eulalie Durocher (1811–1849), a Quebecer catholic educator who founded the Sisters of the Holy Names of Jesus and Mary. She was beatified (bestows title « Blessed ») by the Roman Catholic Church by decree of Pope John Paul II in 1982.

== School and facilities ==
The establishment is modern, has three stories with lots of windows covered with brown bricks and some insertions in concrete. It contains mainly regular classrooms, rooms for computer labs, science labs, a cafeteria, a student café, a library, a Coop, a weight room and an auditorium. The school also comprises a small gymnasium and, outside, a basketball court and a soccer field.

== Programs and services ==
The school offers a program for students from grade 9 to grade 11 for drop-out students from 16 to 21 years old. The school offers full-time and part-time study programs in general education curriculum. As of 2016 there are, on average, 45 teachers and about 700–1,000 students.

Professional services are offered to the students: specialized educators, psychoeducator, education specialist, resources teachers, nurse, guidance counsellor, etc.

== Activities ==
- Back-to-school party
- Basketball
- Battle of the books
- Chess
- Christmas show
- Cosom hockey
- French Week
- Graduation Ball
- Halloween
- Improvisational Theatre
- Meritas Gala
- Movies
- Multicultural Week
- Noon Workshops
- Outdoor sports
- Physical Education Week
- Soccer
- Sugar shack trip
- Weight training
- Year end party
