= F.A.C.E. School =

School in Montreal, Quebec, Canada

Coordinates: 45.5059°N 73.5752°W

- École F.A.C.E.
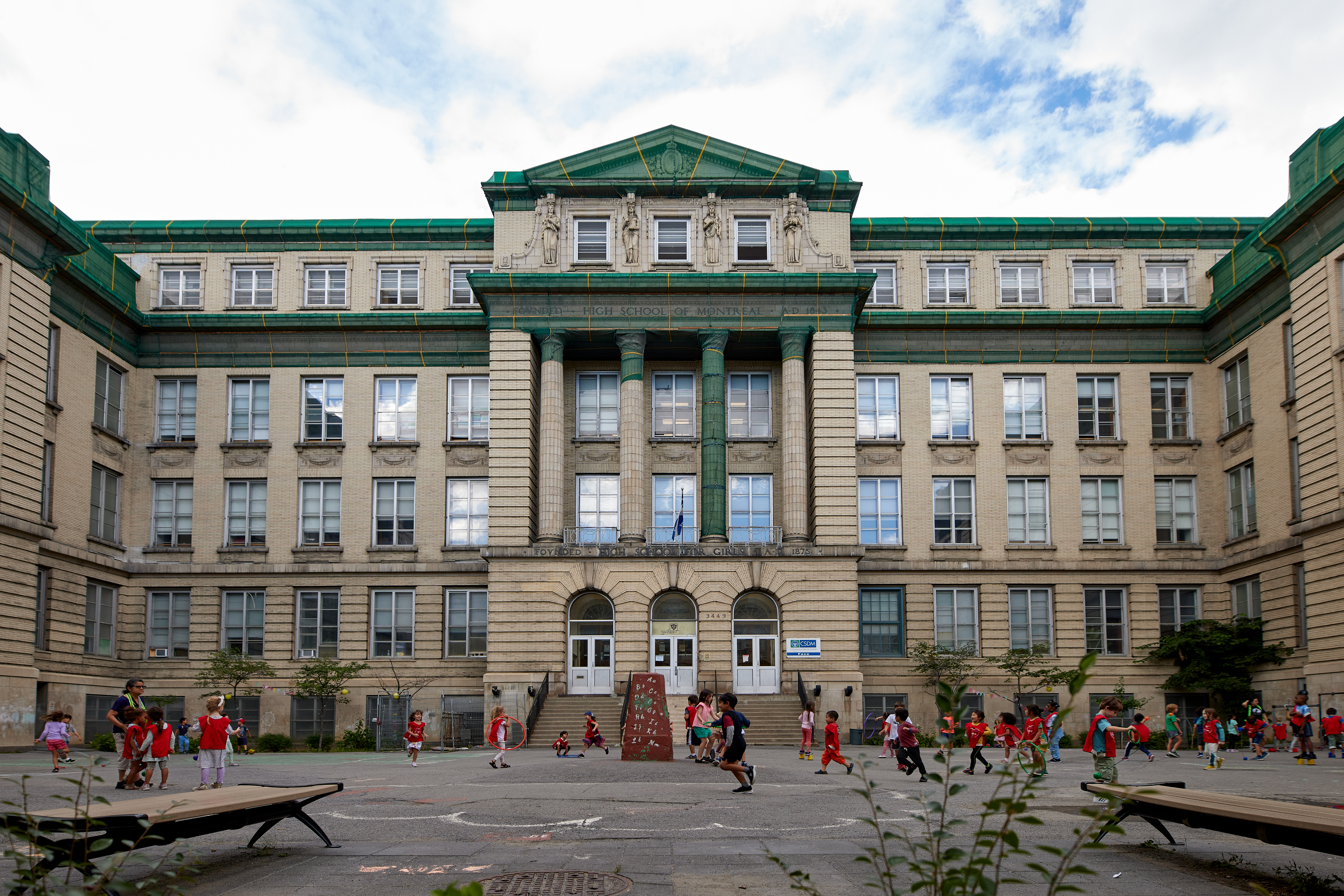
- Main entrance of 3449 University Street

Location
- Elementary: 4835 Christophe Colomb Ave; Secondary: 3449 University Street; Montreal, Quebec, Canada

Information
- Former name: Fine Arts Core Elementary School
- Established: 1975; 51 years ago
- School board: English Montreal School Board; Centre de services scolaire de Montréal
- Principal: Jennifer Harriet
- Vice Principal: Voula Tsagaroulis

F.A.C.E. School (English: Fine Arts Core Education; French: Formation Artistique au Cœur de l'Éducation) is a bilingual kindergarten, elementary and high school in Montreal, Quebec, Canada. It is run jointly by the English Montreal School Board (EMSB) and the Centre de services scolaire de Montréal (CSSDM). There are currently over 1,300 students enrolled.

The school was founded in 1975 with the name Fine Arts Core Elementary School (F.A.C.E.S.). It initially occupied the Victoria School building, now part of Concordia University, before moving to its current location at 3449 University Street, to the east of McGill University's main campus in downtown Montreal. This was previously the home of the High School of Montreal, which had closed in June 1979.

== History ==
The Protestant School Board of Greater Montreal previously operated the school.

== Schedules ==
Students at FACE have extra arts courses in addition to the academics required by both school boards. With over three more hours of class time per week in high school, the dismissal time varies from 2:30 to 2:50 to 3:45. Even then, students are sometimes required (or elect of their own free will) to stay after school for extracurricular courses and projects.

== Language ==
Each grade at FACE is typically divided into four groups: three of them French, and one of them English; however in some of the lower grades, due to varied numbers of students, there are sometimes two to three English groups or two to four French groups. The groups are identified by the number of the grade, followed by E or F, for English or French, and then by a number when there is more than one group of its language (e.g., the English side group of Grade 10 is 10E, and the French side group of Grade 10 is split into 10F1, 10F2 and 10F3). The population of the school has grown over the years requiring new groups to be added such as 1F4 and 1E2.

== Arts program ==
=== Music ===
FACE has built a reputation for its music program in Canada, partially thanks to many MusicFest Canada awards, among other things.

In Grades 1 to 3, students must play xylophone and recorder, after which, in Grade 4, students are tested playing trumpet, strings, clarinet and flute for five weeks each. Each student is then placed in a band or orchestra class where he or she learns to play his or her instrument for seven and a half years until graduation (although some students change instruments partway through). The students showcase their efforts in performances held in the school auditorium at least twice a year.

From Grades 1 to 11, all students participate in a choir class, where students sing a selection of classical pieces and contemporary favorites. This class combines all groups in the grade into one large classroom of approximately 120 to 150 people, with five teachers, one or more of whom plays piano. The choir class also performs at least twice a year in the school auditorium or churches.

=== Theatre ===
Starting in Grade 3, students have a Drama class where they learn theatre skills. Once in grade 10, the students are required to put on a public play, everyone in the class must participate whether they act or work in tech. The performances are held in either the school auditorium or the "P-scène", a smaller auditorium in the basement of the school (see Facilities below). The grade 11 students also have to opportunity to put on a student production, which is extra-curricular and put on entirely by the students. There can be up to two of these per year.

=== Visual art ===
Students participate in visual art classes starting in Kindergarten until grade 11.

== Building ==
The FACE building is situated across University Street from the main campus of McGill University.

== Athletics ==
While principally an art school, FACE has also had its fair share of athletic successes. The school's students consistently do well in school board badminton tournaments and have one Division Three basketball title to their name. The school is quickly becoming a powerhouse in both outdoor and indoor soccer having won a title in both since 2006 and in 2009, the Jazz clinched their first ever playoff berth in Division One basketball. The Jazz men's basketball team advanced to the finals, after finishing first in their division for the first time in 1999.

== Floors ==
FACE is divided into six floors, from the basement to the fourth. The kindergarten classes are all on the first floor. Grades one to three generally occupy most of the second floor, while Grades 4 and higher have classes on all floors. There is also a sub-basement.

There are four staircases going through the basement to the 4th floor. They are called "red stairs, "green stairs", "blue stairs" and yellow stairs". The Yellow stairs lead to the sub-basement. Another staircase, called the black stairs (by students) at the bottom of the blue stairs leads to the sub-basement. The stairs have since been repainted and are no longer representative of their name.

=== Facilities ===
FACE contains basic school facilities, such as an office, a cafeteria, a library, four gymnasiums, many science and computer laboratories, and teachers' lounges. However, to suit the school's artistic program, there is also a large auditorium on the first floor which hosts numerous plays, concerts and a fashion show, as well as a smaller one in the basement dubbed the "P-Scène" by students, a word play because the room was once host to a swimming pool, which translates to "piscine" and is now principally a stage, which translates to the French "scène". North of the building, a small, abandoned yard was planted and transformed into an "urban forest" where teachers can take their classes for an outdoor teaching experience. It was baptized "Forêt Frédéric-Back" and inaugurated in 2016.

== Notable alumni ==
- Kamala Harris
- Maya Harris
- Melissa Auf der Maur
- Rufus Wainwright
- Jay Baruchel
- Mitsou
- Mariloup Wolfe
- Fanny Britt
- Nicholas Simons
- Stéphane Tétreault
