= École internationale de Montréal =

École internationale de Montréal (Secondaire)
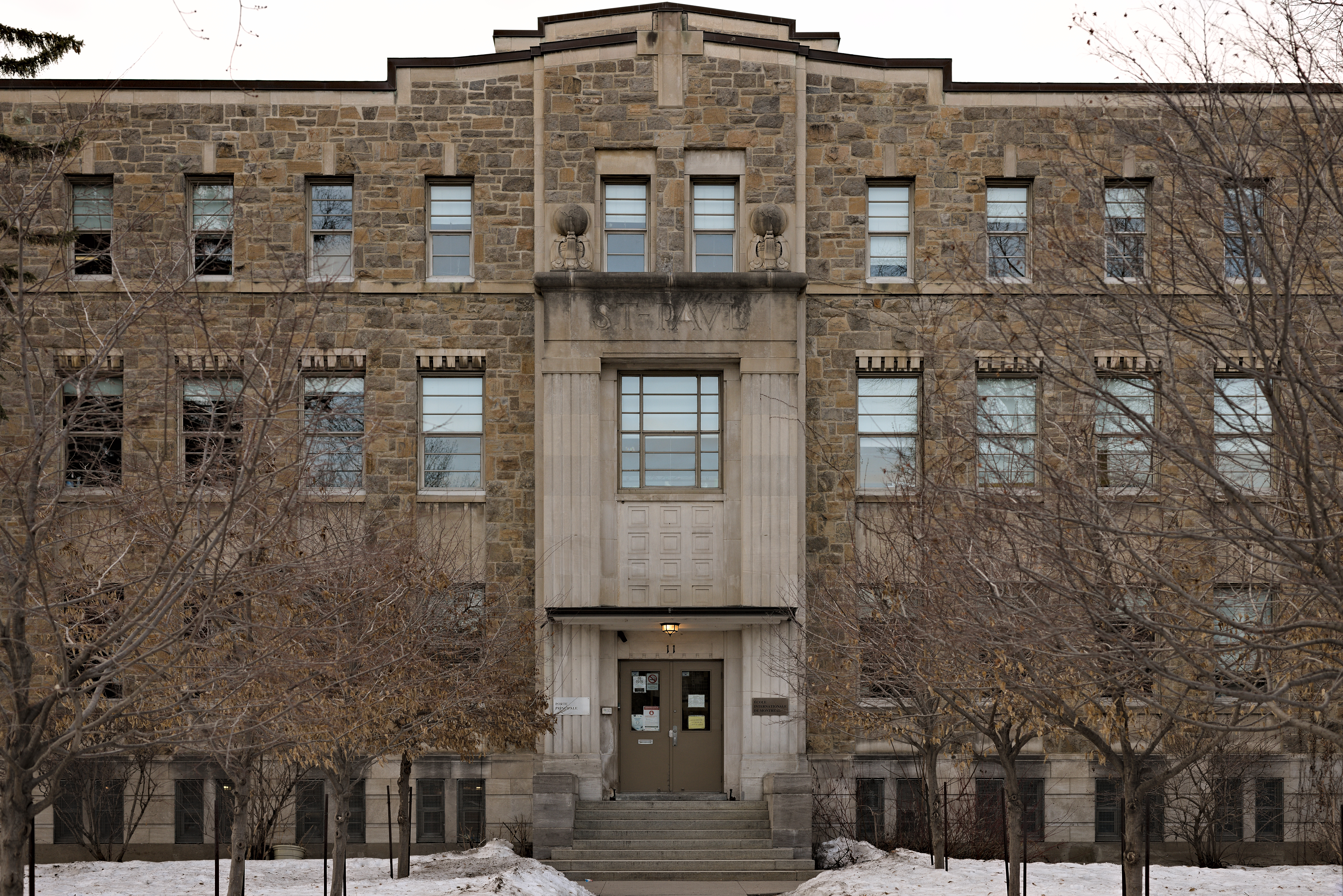

Location
- 11, chemin de la Côte-Saint-Antoine; Westmount, Quebec, H3Y 2H7; Canada; 45.4867°N 73.5957°W

Information
- Funding type: Public
- School district: Centre de services scolaire de Montréal
- Principal: Benoît Grenier
- Enrollment: 562
- Public transit access: From Atwater metro station: walk, bus 24 W (a block away), bus 104 W, bus 138 W.; From Villa-Maria metro station: bus 24 E.; Vendôme metro station: bus 104 E.
- Website: ecole-internationale.csdm.ca

École internationale de Montréal (Secondaire) (lit. "International School of Montreal (Secondary)") is a public French-language high school located in Westmount, Quebec. It is a part of the Centre de services scolaire de Montréal (CSSDM).

== About the school ==
Most people use the acronym ÉIM (EIM) or ÉIMS (EIMS) when referring to the school. Its principal was Julie Duchesne until 2020 when it became Luc Claude. In 2026, it became Benoît Grenier, then Chantal Laurin. The school is situated near the Westmount Public Library. The school was opened in 1988 and is an International Baccalaureate (IB) school. The school uniform consists of a choice of red or grey polos and of a marine-black vest or jacket. The dress code policy allowed students to wear any non offensive item of clothing, and not "too short" on the bottom, but in the fall of 2016, the school board decided that students should only wear marine or black unicolored clothing on the bottom. Since students often wore blue pants and said that they were just washed-off marine pants, the school imposed a black-only pants rule in 2017.

Even though the school is a public school, it has an admission exam that sixth graders undergo in October each year. Typically, the school admits 120 students per year (four classes of 30). Those who studied in École internationale de Montréal (Primaire) have priority to be admitted to EIMS. The number of students from École internationale de Montréal (Primaire) who choose the school varies from 40 to 60 per year, thus leaving only 60–80 places for students from other schools. The number of students taking the admission tests varies from 600 to 1000.

=== Milestones ===
In 2015, the Fraser Institute ranked the school 7th within all of Quebec's high schools, making it the second highest ranking public high school in Quebec and first in Montreal.

In 2016, the Fraser Institute ranked the school third within all of Quebec's high schools, making it the highest ranking public high school in Quebec and Montreal.

In 2020, the school tied for first in the Fraser Institute's Quebec high school ranking, achieving a perfect score of 10.

== Graduation and diplomas ==
Students at EIMS graduate with up to 3 diplomas.

- Ministry of Education (MEES): The MEES gives the normal High School Diploma (DES). To obtain this diploma, the student has to pass these following classes: French (Sec.5), English (Sec.5 Advanced Program), Mathematics (Sec.4 or 5), Sciences and Technology (Sec.4), History and Citizenship Education (Sec.4), Ethics and Religious Cultures (Sec.5), Physical Education (Sec.5) and Arts (Sec.4 ou 5).
- IB: The IB gives the International Education Certificate. To obtain this diploma, the student has to have done all the hours of community service; based on the IB evaluation criteria, he/she should obtained at least a 3/7 for his/her Personal Project (PP), at least 2/7 in each subject groups and at least 28/49 when the subject groups' results and PP's result are added.
- SEBIQ: The SEBIQ gives the DESI (International Secondary Education Diploma). To obtain this diploma, the student has to get their High School Diploma (DES) and International Education Certificate; pass advanced French, advanced English, Spanish, Mathematics SN (Sec.5), Chemistry or Physics (Sec.5), Contemporary World Geography and Actualities and Personal Project (PP).

== Classes offered ==
=== Mandatory classes ===
The school offers these following mandatory classes:

- Arts (class given in Sec.1-4);
- Arts and Multimedia (class given in Sec.5);
- Contemporary World Geography and Actualities (class given in Sec.5);
- English, second language (separated in regular and advanced classes in Sec.1-3 based on placement examination done in sixth grade);
- Enriched English (class given in Sec.4-5);
- Enriched French (class given in Sec.5);
- Environmental Sciences and Technology (class given in Sec.4);
- Quebec Culture and Citizenship (class not given in Sec.3);
- French, language of instruction;
- Finances (class given in Sec.5)
- Geography (class given in Sec.1-2);
- History and Citizenship Education (class given in Sec.1-4);
- IB Design (class given in Sec.3);
- Mathematics (choice between SN or CST in Sec.4 and 5);
- Methodology (integrated within all classes);
- Physical Education;
- Sciences and Technology (class given in Sec.1-4);
- Spanish, third language (class given in Sec.1-3, separated in regular and advanced classes based on placement examination done in sixth grade).

=== Optional classes ===
- Journalism (class offered in Sec. 4);
- Theatre Arts: Drama (class offered in Sec. 4);
- Either Chemistry and Physics classes or History and General sciences classes (sec 5).
