= Montreal Catholic School Commission =

Coordinates: 45°32′59″N 73°33′21″W

Montreal Catholic School Commission (Commission des écoles catholiques de Montréal)

Location
- 3737, Sherbrooke Street East, Montreal, Quebec H1X 3B3 Montreal Canada

District information
- Chair of the board: Yves Archambault (at the time the board was abolished)
- Schools: 275 (in 1996)

Students and staff
- Students: 131,000 (in 1996)

Other information
- Website: www.cecm.qc.ca

The Montreal Catholic School Commission (Commission des écoles catholiques de Montréal, CECM) was a Roman Catholic school district in Montreal, Quebec, Canada which operated both French-language and English-language schools. It was the largest school board in Quebec, and was created on June 9, 1846, at the same time as a Protestant school commission, which became the Protestant School Board of Greater Montreal. When Quebec's religious "confessional" school boards were replaced by linguistic ones in 1998, the French-language schools and the board's headquarters were turned over to the Commission scolaire de Montréal and its English-language schools to the English Montreal School Board. In 1847, the board had 377 pupils. By 1917, this number increased to 75,000 students. The first kindergarten was established in 1914. An alliance of Catholic teachers was founded in 1919. Primary education is established during the 1920s. During the 1930s, the MCSC began to distribute milk to students and the first school for the disabled opened.

Teachers threatened to strike in 1945. Union activist Léo Guindon was dismissed by the commission in 1948. In January 1949, a long strike paralyzed the board. The English sector of the MCSC became independent in 1963. In 1964, the Ministry of Education of Quebec was established, reducing the authority of boards and religious leaders in the school system. The school population reached a peak in 1970 with 229,000 pupils and 400 schools. The commissioners were originally appointed, but were elected for the first time in 1973. In 1981, the Levesque government of René Lévesque restricted access of the clergy to the schools. In 1982, the commissioners introduced a program of sexuality education. In 1990, the committee adopted a policy to promote the use of French.

In 1996, when the district celebrated its 150th anniversary, it had a total of 130,000 students; of them 90,000, including 80,000 in the French-language schools and 10,000 in the English-language schools, were in the public school system. The district served Montreal, Côte Saint-Luc, Hampstead, Montréal-Nord, and Westmount.

As of 1996, the district had 229 French-language schools, including 150 elementary schools, 35 secondary schools, and 28 special schools (some operated adult education programmes, some operated vocational and technical programmes). The English-language schools included 20 elementary schools, 8 secondary schools, and five special schools. The district had 13 special schools for students with handicaps, disabilities, and behavioral problems. The district classified 40% of its enrollment as "multiethnic."

== The end of the MCSC ==
Groups such as the Committee for Neutral Schools opposed religious schools and religious school boards. In the 1990s, a secular group called the Mouvement laïque québécois began a class action lawsuit against the board, and two political parties competed for power within the MCSC: the religious Regroupement scolaire confessionnel led by Michel Pallascio (RSM) et the secular Mouvement pour une école moderne et ouverte laïciste (MEMO) headed by Diane De Courcy.

The MCSC and the other confessional school boards were abolished on July 1, 1998 by the Marois reform which secularized the public schools in Montreal and created linguistic school boards. The MCSC's last chairperson was Yves Archambault.

Most schools in the French-speaking sector went to the Commission scolaire de Montréal and those in the English-speaking sector went to the English Montreal School Board. Some schools in the eastern portion of the MCSC were transferred to the Commission scolaire de la Pointe-de-l'Île (CSPÎ), which had replaced the Commission scolaire Jérôme-Le Royer.

== Elections for school trustees ==
=== 1973 ===
Electoral District
Position
Total valid votes
Candidates
Mouvement scolaire confessionnel
Les parents solidaires
Mouvement pour la démocratisation scolaire
Comité des parents responsables
Independents
District One
Trustee
7,711
Benoît Hubert (combined endorsement)
2,318 (30.06%)

Donat J. Taddeo
3,052 (39.58%)

Robert Lajeunesse
1,509 (19.57%)

Anita Bourget
548 (7.11%)

Carlo Gatti
284 (3.68%)
District Two
Trustee
5,008
Rollande Pelletier (combined endorsement)
2,337 (46.67%)
Francis Calabretta
701 (14.00%)
Réjean Dugas
148 (2.96%)
Frank Hanley
1,512 (30.19%)

Cléophas Saint-Aubin
310 (6.19%)
District Three
Trustee
7,538
Michael J. McDonald (incumbent)
5,432 (72.06%)

Pierre Gauthier
418 (5.55%)
Gérard Nolot
1,036 (13.74%)

André Forget
652 (8.65%)
District Four
Trustee
5,910
Gerald J. Long (combined endorsement)
2,090 (35.36%)
Pierre Carignan
2,432 (41.15%)
Jacqueline Clermont
457 (7.73%)
Stella Ohan
582 (9.85%)

Gérard Raymond
349 (5.91%)
District Five
Trustee
4,087
J-Réjean Charron
900 (22.02%)
Denis Brisebois
1,151 (28.16%)
Bernard Stockli
522 (12.77%)

Damase Leclerc
589 (14.41%)

Guy Primeau
517 (12.65%)

Denis Tremblay
258 (6.31%)

Edgar Frechette
84 (2.06%)

Manuel Teixeira
66 (1.61%)
District Six
Trustee
4,745
Louisia Poirier
1,385 (29.19%)

Gaston Michaud
1,409 (29.69%)

Joseph L. Page (incumbent)
1,198 (25.25%)

Jean-Baptiste Landry
500 (10.54%)

Jean-Paul Gill
167 (3.52%)

Aldéo Forest
86 (1.81%)
District Seven
Trustee
6,491
Norbert Lacoste
2,902 (44.71%)
Gaston Teasdale
1,138 (17.53%)
Adrien Simard
1,949 (30.03%)
Raymond Gosselin
502 (7.73%)

District Eight
Trustee
5,332
Luc Larivée
1,916 (35.93%)
André Lorange
1,735 (32.54%)
Fernand Daoust (incumbent)
1,431 (26.84%)

Léonard Chevalier
124 (2.33%)

Edner Berlus
78 (1.46%)

Gérard Cabana
48 (0.90%)
District Nine
Trustee
5,130
Paul-Émile Riverin (combined endorsement)
1,025 (19.98%)

Pierre Legare
2,224 (43.35%)

Yolande Millette-Roux
1,644 (32.05%)

Rolland Roy
237 (4.62%)
District Ten
Trustee
6,196
Pauline Morissette
524 (8.46%)
Robert Masse
1,435 (23.16%)

Lucien Boily
1,750 (28.24%)

Pierrette Brunet
1,200 (19.37%)

Gaëtan Lavoie
515 (8.31%)

Lucien Deschamps
450 (7.26%)

Ernest Cyr
192 (3.10%)

Zotique Duchaine
130 (2.10%)
District Eleven
Trustee
7,211
André Bailey
1,356 (18.80%)
Gilbert Cinq-Mars
1,058 (14.57%)
Jean-Paul Cloutier
813 (11.27%)

Pierre Des Ruisseaux
3,018 (41.85%)

Jean Jodoin
966 (13.40%)
District Twelve
Trustee
6,468
Léo Aubry
1,386 (21.43%)
André Milot
736 (11.38%)

Cécile Poissant
2,662 (41.16%)

Jean Bonetto
872 (13.48%)

Robert Patenaude
466 (7.20%)

Isidore Robichaud
346 (5.35%)
District Thirteen
Trustee
7,977
Antoinette Paris
704 (8.83%)
Lise Sarrazin
3,088 (38.71%)

Aline Brun
176 (2.21%)
Oscar Damiani
1,849 (23.18%)

Philippe Lafortune
1,396 (17.50%)

Agostino Gaudelli
764 (9.58%)
District Fourteen
Trustee
5,962
Gilles Plante
1,294 (21.70%)

Thérèse Lavoie-Roux (incumbent)
3,186 (53.44%)

Umberto di Genova
706 (11.84%)

Roger Gauthier
484 (8.12%)

Henri Paquet
292 (4.90%)
District Fifteen
Trustee
7,384

Claudette Sauvé
1,469 (19.89%)

Louis Bouchard
2,064 (27.95%)

Clément Lemelin
1,982 (26.84%)

Gilles Desjardins
1,390 (18.82%)

Evasio Vellone
479 (6.49%)
District Sixteen
Trustee
7,604
Thérèse Killens (combined endorsement)
3,358 (44.16%)
Raymond Marcotte
575 (7.56%)
Aline St-Onge
565 (7.43%)
Norma Legault
1,627 (21.40%)

Tarcisio Donnini
1,479 (19.45%)
District Seventeen
Trustee
11,404
André Morais
1,171 (10.27%)
Colette Biche
6,627 (58.11%)

Jude-Alexandre Dumas
70 (0.61%)
Hugues Poulin
1,510 (13.24%)

Jean-Marc Chevrier
879 (7.71%)

André Steenhaut
619 (5.43%)

Pierre Corbeil
353 (3.10%)

Nicole Aubry
93 (0.82%)

Victor Beauchemin
82 (0.72%)
District Eighteen
Trustee
9,282
Joseph Savard
2,638 (28.42%)
Guy Messier
2,139 (23.04%)

Paul-Félix Baillargeon
254 (2.74%)
Patrice Laplante
3,188 (34.35%)

Giuseppe G. Delvasto
769 (8.28%)

Sid A. Zitouni
294 (3.17%)
District Nineteen
Trustee
7,365
Marcel Parent (combined endorsement)
1,937 (26.30%)

Paul Daigneault
3,829 (51.99%)

Gilles St-Onge
1,109 (15.06%)

J-Léopold Gagnier
490 (6.65%)
Sources: Le Devoir, 19 June 1973, p. 6; Le Devoir, 20 June 1973, p. 6 [District Ten].

| Party | Elected members |
|---|---|
| Independent | 9 |
| Mouvement scolaire confessionnel | 3 |
| Les parents solidaires | 3 |
| Mouvement scolaire confessionnel–Les parents solidaires | 2 |
| Mouvement pour la démocratisation scolaire | 2 |

=== 1977 ===
Electoral District
Position
Total valid votes
Candidates
Mouvement scolaire confessionnel
Regroupement scolaire progressiste
Independents
District One
Trustee

Benoît Hubert (elected)

Lucille Morel
District Two
Trustee

Rollande Pelletier (incumbent; elected)
Viviane Caron

District Three
Trustee
7,947
Donat Taddeo (incumbent)
7,227 (90.94%)
Jacques Desjardins
720 (9.06%)

District Four
Trustee

Robert Sauvé (elected)
Pierre Normandeau

District Five
Trustee

J.-Réjean Charron
Yves Archambault
Denise Brizard (elected)
District Six
Trustee

Jimmy di Genova (elected)
Gaston Michaud (incumbent)
Raymond Gosselin
District Seven
Trustee

Norbert Lacoste (incumbent; elected)
Irène Poupart
J-Albert Rouleau

Marcel Thibault
District Eight
Trustee

Luc Larivée (incumbent; elected)
André LeBlanc
Robert Aubin
District Nine
Trustee

Rodrigue Tourville (elected)
Pierre Legare (incumbent)
André Laquinte
District Ten
Trustee

Jean-Guy Deschamps (elected)

André Côté

John Galipeau
District Eleven
Trustee

Pierre Des Ruisseaux (incumbent; elected)
Yolande Paquette
Auguste Mollica
District Twelve
Trustee

Madeleine Neron (elected)
Cécile Poissant (incumbent)
Alain Paquette
District Thirteen
Trustee

Angelo Montini (elected)
Lise Sarrazin (incumbent)
Daniel Rizard
District Fourteen
Trustee

Jeannette Milot (elected)

Umberto di Genova

Gilbert Rouleau
District Fifteen
Trustee

Louis Bouchard (incumbent; elected)
Clément Lemelin
Robert Desrochers

Evasio Vellone
District Sixteen
Trustee

Thérèse Killens (incumbent; elected)

Norma Legault
District Seventeen
Trustee

Colette Biche (incumbent; elected)
Hélène Savard-Jacob

District Eighteen
Trustee

Éric Renaud (elected)
Jacqueline Arcand-Beauchemin (incumbent)
Guy-Maurice Lalonde
District Nineteen
Trustee

André Corbeil (elected)
Jacques Bergeron
Thérèse Desroches
Sources: Le Devoir, 7 June 1977, p. 3 (party affiliations); Montreal Star, 14 June 1977, A10.

| Party | Elected members |
|---|---|
| Mouvement scolaire confessionnel | 18 |
| Independent | 1 |

=== 1980 ===
Electoral District
Position
Total valid votes
Candidates
Mouvement scolaire confessionnel
Independents endorsed by the Association provincial des enseignants catholiques
Other independents
District One
Trustee
-
Benoît Hubert (incumbent; acclaimed)

District Two
Trustee
-
Rollande Pelletier (incumbent; acclaimed)

District Three
Trustee
7,947
Mireille Paquin
941 (28.12%)
Hugh Quinlan
1,289 (38.52%)
Danielle Laberge-Amyote
937 (28.00%)

Paul E. Fortin
179 (5.35%)
District Four
Trustee
3,030
Francine Synnott
1,858 (61.32%)
Robert Sauvé (incumbent)
1,172 (38.68%)

District Five
Trustee
-
Denise Brizard (incumbent; acclaimed)

District Six
Trustee
2,539
Michel Pallascio
1,330 (52.38%)
Jimmy di Genova (incumbent)
1,209 (47.62%)

District Seven
Trustee
2,937
Norbert Lacoste (incumbent)
1,801 (61.32%)
Daniel Bouffard
660 (22.47%)
Armand Baron
476 (16.21%)
District Eight
Trustee
3,182
Luc Larivée (incumbent)
1,597 (50.19%)
Lise Leblanc
1,585 (49.81%)

District Nine
Trustee
3,472
Rodrigue Tourville (incumbent)
1,889 (54.41%)
Jean Miller
459 (13.22%)
Marguerite Fortin
1,124 (32.37%)
District Ten
Trustee
3,559
Jean-Guy Deschamps (incumbent)
2,435 (68.42%)
Albert Berardinucci
1,124 (31.58%)

District Eleven
Trustee
4,413
Carmen G. Millette
3,349 (75.89%)

Claudette Bélanger
1,064 (24.11%)
District Twelve
Trustee
3,350
André Mathurin
1,432 (42.75%)
Madeleine Neron (incumbent)
840 (25.07%)
Gilles Longtin
704 (21.01%)

Gilles Paré
374 (11.16%)
District Thirteen
Trustee
4,451
Umberto di Genova (combined endorsement)
2,305 (51.79%)
Lise Sarrazin
2,146 (48.21%)
District Fourteen
Trustee
2,933
Jeannette Milot (incumbent)
2,103 (71.70%)
Henriette Couture
830 (28.30%)

District Fifteen
Trustee
4,607
Louis Bouchard (incumbent))
2,554 (55.44%)
Lucille Lapierre-Morotti
1,366 (29.65%)
Gise le Gelineau
687 (14.91%)
District Sixteen
Trustee
-
Marcel Parent (acclaimed)

District Seventeen
Trustee
-
Bernard Grégoire (acclaimed)

District Eighteen
Trustee
5,286
Éric Renaud (incumbent)
3,202 (60.58%)
Harold White
188 (3.56%)
Victor Pierre Elbert
1,221 (23.10%)

Santino Cordileone
675 (12.77%)
District Nineteen
Trustee
4,018
André Corbeil (incumbent)
2,448 (60.93%)
Florent Gagnon
1,570 (39.07%)

Sources: Le Devoir, 6 June 1980, p. 2; Le Devoir, 10 June 1980, p. 1; Montreal Gazette, 11 June 1980, p. 118.

| Party | Elected members |
|---|---|
| Mouvement scolaire confessionnel | 18 |
| Independent | 1 |

=== 1983 ===
Electoral District
Position
Total valid votes
Candidates
Mouvement scolaire confessionnel
Regroupement scolaire de l'île de Montréal
Independents
District One
Trustee
3,817
Benoît Hubert (incumbent)
2,954 (77.39%)

Nicole Gagnon
863 (22.61%)
District Two
Trustee
2,988
Rollande Pelletier (incumbent)
2,642 (88.42%)

Romeo Godin
346 (11.58%)
District Three
Trustee
4,687
Ray Doucet
2,690 (57.39%)

Teresa Kennedy
1,235 (26.35%)

Richard Godin
465 (9.92%)

William Siemienski
210 (4.48%)

William Anjo
87 (1.86%)
District Four
Trustee
2,560
Estelle Trudel
1,838 (71.80%)

Roger Bourbonnais
395 (15.43%)

Christiane Gervais
327 (12.77%)
District Five
Trustee
2,060
Denise Brizard (incumbent)
1,548 (75.15%)

André Roberge
343 (16.65%)

Lucie Chabot
169 (8.20%)
District Six
Trustee
1,985
Michel Pallascio (incumbent)
1,511 (76.12%)

Jean-G. Oliver
474 (23.88%)
District Seven
Trustee
2,371
Norbert Lacoste (incumbent)
1,814 (76.51%)

Jean-Pierre Hétu
557 (23.49%)
District Eight
Trustee
2,460
Nicole Pace-Lalumière
1,147 (46.63%)

Paul Portugais
782 (31.79%)

Jean-Guy Chaput
531 (21.59%)
District Nine
Trustee
3,254
Rodrigue Tourville (incumbent)
1,306 (40.14%)

Bernard Lajeunesse
1,091 (33.53%)

Margo Fortin
857 (26.34%)
District Ten
Trustee
3,161
Jean-Guy Deschamps (incumbent)
2,417 (76.46%)

Scott McKay
400 (12.65%)

Jean-Pierre Vincelette
344 (10.88%)
District Eleven
Trustee
4,744
Carmen G. Millette (incumbent)
3,350 (70.62%)

Robert Martin
1,152 (24.28%)

Louis-Philippe Mailly
242 (5.10%)
District Twelve
Trustee
3,048
André Mathurin (incumbent)
1,331 (43.67%)

Jean Brouillette
1,461 (47.93%)

Gilles Paré
256 (8.40%)
District Thirteen
Trustee
3,777
Umberto di Genova (incumbent)
2,191 (58.01%)

Gino Fortini
1,586 (41.99%)
District Fourteen
Trustee
2,872
Jeannette Milot (incumbent)
1,929 (67.17%)

Jocelyne Perreault
674 (23.47%)

André Querry
269 (9.37%)
District Fifteen
Trustee
3,881
Louis Bouchard (incumbent))
2,977 (76.71%)

Jenny Labelle
904 (23.29%)
District Sixteen
Trustee
4,577
Marcel Parent (incumbent)
3,646 (79.66%)

Lise Coderre-Ducharme
931 (20.34%)
District Seventeen
Trustee
5,737
Bernard Grégoire (incumbent)
4,444 (77.46%)
Michel Charbonneau
1,293 (22.54%)

District Eighteen
Trustee
5,004
Éric Renaud (incumbent)
3,378 (67.51%)

Anna Campagna
1,007 (20.12%)

Adrienne Labelle-Savard
619 (12.37%)
District Nineteen
Trustee
4,047
André Corbeil (incumbent)
2,459 (60.76%)

Louise di Claudio
1,050 (25.95%)

Pierre-S. Marchand
298 (7.36%)

Raymond Belair
240 (5.93%)
Sources: Montreal Gazette, 14 June 1983, p. 6; Le Devoir, 14 June 1983, p. 1.

| Party | Elected members |
|---|---|
| Mouvement scolaire confessionnel | 18 |
| Independent | 1 |
