= Janine Krieber =

Canadian political scientist

- Born: Alma, Quebec, Canada
- Occupation: political scientist
- Spouse: Stéphane Dion (m. 1986)

Janine Krieber is a Canadian political scientist, studying terrorism and international security. Her husband is Stéphane Dion, former leader of the Liberal Party of Canada and former Minister of Foreign Affairs.

Krieber was born in Alma, Quebec, and is the oldest of three children. Her mother was a journalist and her father a photographer who was born in Austria. Krieber met Dion while the two were working toward their master's degrees in political science at Université Laval. They later moved to France together to study at the Paris Institute of Political Studies, where they completed their respective doctoral degrees.

Upon returning to Canada, Krieber took a teaching post at Université Laval. She has since gone on to teach at Royal Military College Saint-Jean and work for the Department of National Defence in Ottawa.

== Politics ==
Krieber drew some controversy in the 2008 election. She complained that she was being muzzled by the Liberals, though party officials denied it. Reportedly, insiders had concerns that the outspoken Krieber would not stick to the party line and take the focus away from Dion. Krieber also refused at last minute to introduce Dion at a women's event because she felt that the brief speech prepared for her by campaign headquarters was undignified.

On November 22, 2009, Krieber wrote a scathing letter on her Facebook page in which she suggested that the Liberal Party was in full collapse and the future appeared bleak. She questioned then-leader Michael Ignatieff's ability to lead the party out of its current woes, alleging that party members were duped by Ignatieff and would have recognized his obvious shortcomings if they'd only taken the time to read his academic writings. Krieber claimed that Dion had been working to rebuild the party after the disappointing 2008 election, but their efforts were stymied by Ignatieff, who "dethroned Dion without a leadership race", and criticized him for rejecting the coalition deal in the 2008–2009 Canadian parliamentary dispute.

In Montreal's 2013 municipal election, Krieber ran for Montreal City Council as a Projet Montréal candidate for the district of Saint-Jacques in the Ville-Marie borough. Although she won the election, she ran as a colistière for party leader Richard Bergeron; under Montreal's municipal election process, this means that Bergeron, an unsuccessful mayoral candidate in the same election, retained the right to take office as the councillor for Saint-Jacques in place of Krieber. Bergeron announced following the election that he would take the seat.
