= 2006 Liberal leadership bid by Stéphane Dion =

Official logo for Dion's leadership campaign.

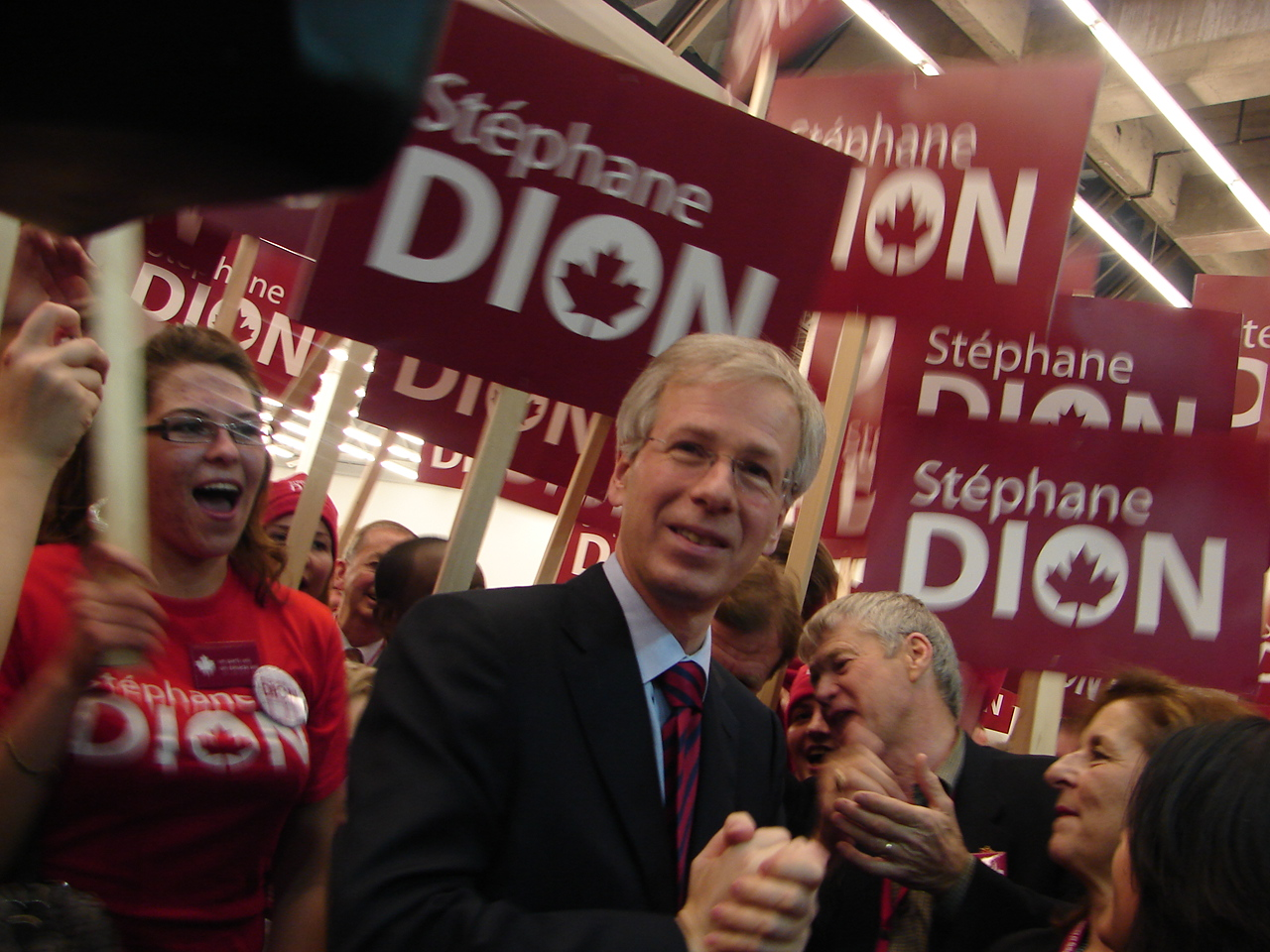
Dion at a December 1 rally during the leadership convention.

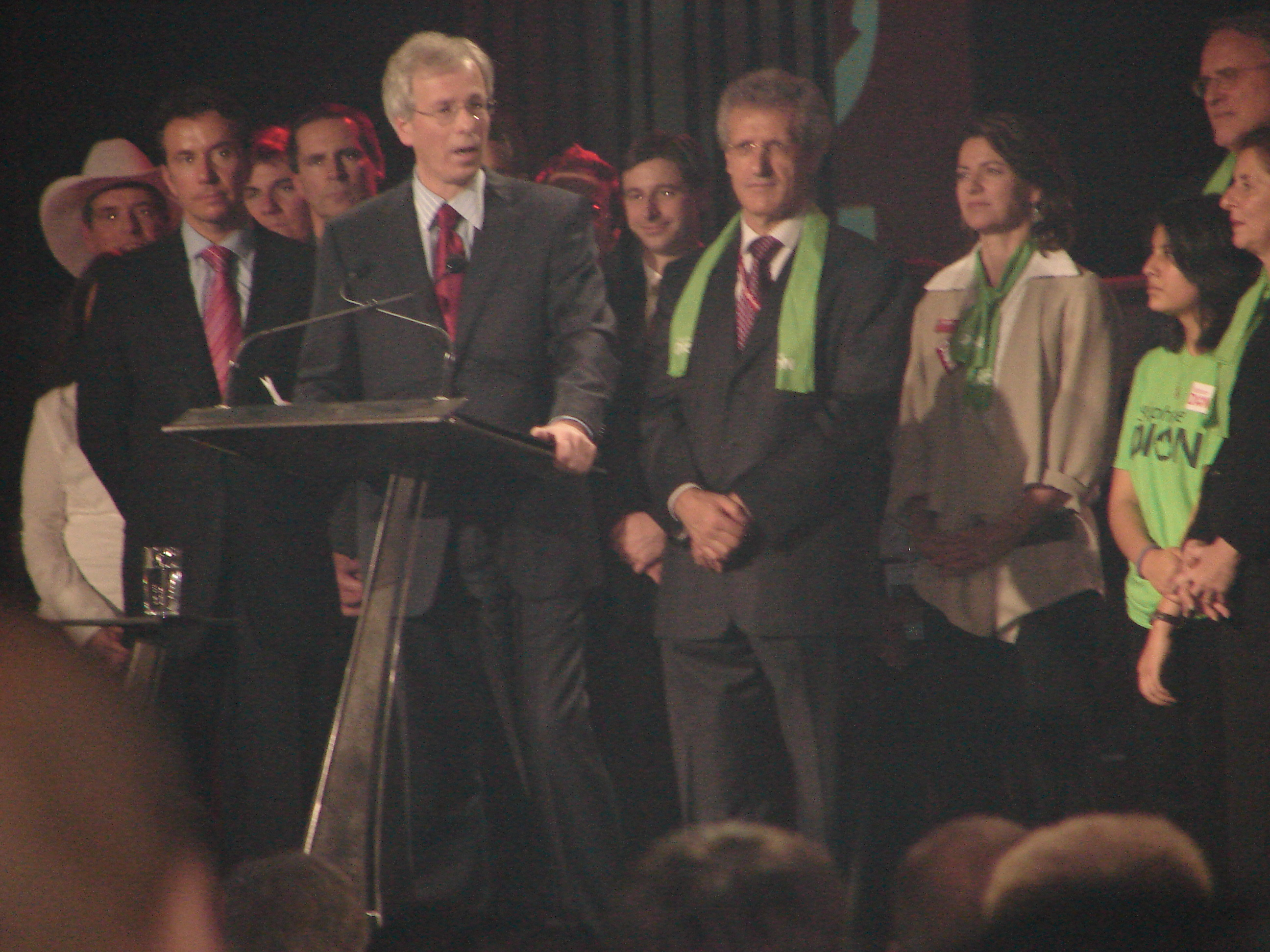
Dion, during his acceptance speech. Behind him is Scott Brison, Joe Volpe, Martha Hall Findlay, and Ken Dryden.

Stéphane Dion won the leadership of the Liberal Party of Canada on December 2, 2006.

With the defeat of the Liberal Party in the 2006 federal election, Dion was suggested as a potential leadership candidate for the party. On April 7, 2006, he announced his candidacy at the Montreal Convention Centre at 7:30 am, the day of the official beginning of the race and the candidacy announcement by Michael Ignatieff.

Dion's leadership campaign was referred to as the three-pillar approach. This approach focused on social justice, economic prosperity, and environmental sustainability, and a claim that a combination of these pillars would bring Canada into the 21st century. He said that his campaign would focus on sustainable development of the economy and creating a "hyper-educated" Canadian workforce in order to compete with China. Dion has been able to draw from three factions of the party to date, with Chrétien Cabinet member Don Boudria, former Martin BC Campaign Chair Mark Marissen and former John Manley Campaign Chair Herb Metcalfe agreeing to sign on to his campaign.

Dion was a lower-key figure in the leadership race, with much of the media and political attention being centered on the race's two most high-profile candidates, Michael Ignatieff and former Ontario New Democratic Party premier Bob Rae. Federal NDP leader Jack Layton described Dion as "A man of principle and conviction and therefore almost certain not to be elected leader of the Liberal party." For much of the campaign, front-runner Ignatieff had the strongest support in Dion's home province of Quebec. Dion's level of support was similar to that of former Ontario cabinet minister Gerard Kennedy, both candidates being in a distant third/fourth place, though still significantly higher than the other four leadership contestants.

Nevertheless, some analysts argued that Dion had several advantages over other candidates. Dion was able to draw support from the two factions of the party. The Chrétien wing of the party was represented by Chrétien-era Cabinet member Don Boudria, while former John Manley Campaign Chair Herb Metcalfe also signed on to Dion's campaign. The Martin wing of the party was represented by former Martin BC Campaign Chair Mark Marissen and two-time losing Liberal candidate in Burnaby—Douglas, Bill Cunningham. Others predicted that Dion had an edge as the only French Canadian in the race, as the Liberal Party has a famous tradition of rotating its leadership between francophones and anglophones, and it was arguably a francophone's "turn." Some analysts also felt Dion had an advantage because, unlike Ignatieff and Rae, he had served in Martin's Cabinet. Since 1948, every Liberal leader has been a minister under his predecessor.

As of October 1, 2006, Dion had captured approximately 17% of the delegate spots available for the December leadership convention in Montreal. This resulted in his entering the convention in fourth place behind Ignatieff, Rae and former Ontario Education Minister Gerard Kennedy.

On December 2, 2006 at the Liberal Party leadership convention, he nevertheless managed to leapfrog Kennedy to finish third after the first ballot by two votes, garnering 17.8% compared to 17.7% for Kennedy. On the second ballot he took a 90-vote lead over Kennedy, after which Kennedy withdrew, throwing his support behind Dion.

On the third ballot he was in first place with 37%, followed by Michael Ignatieff with 34.5%. Rae, with 28.5%—thus eliminated—freed his delegates to vote as they wished. Many threw their support behind Dion, as did former leadership candidates Ken Dryden and Joe Volpe.

On the fourth ballot, Dion captured roughly 54.7% and was declared the new leader of the Liberal Party of Canada.

After the election win, Federal NDP leader Jack Layton urged Dion to renounce his dual citizenship with France saying that "I would prefer that a leader of a party hold only Canadian citizenship, because one represents many Canadians, and for me that means that it's better to remain the citizen of one country."

Dion dismissed calls to give up French citizenship.
