= Stéphane Dion =

Canadian politician and diplomat (born 1955)

The Honourable Stéphane Dion PC
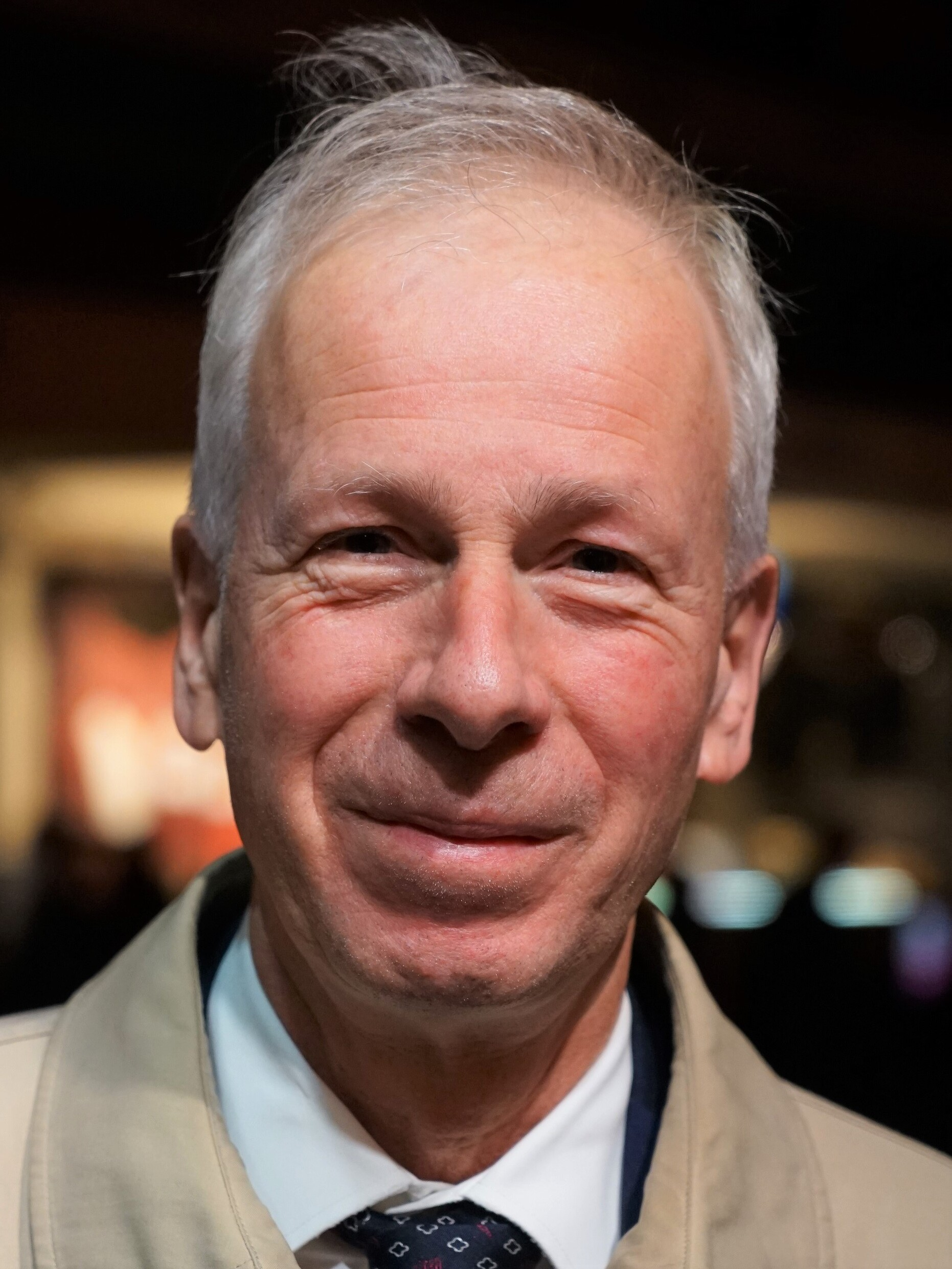
- Dion in 2021

Leader of the Opposition
- In office 2 December 2006 – 10 December 2008
- Monarch: Elizabeth II
- Prime Minister: Stephen Harper
- Preceded by: Bill Graham
- Succeeded by: Michael Ignatieff

Leader of the Liberal Party
- In office 2 December 2006 – 10 December 2008
- Deputy: Lucienne Robillard; Michael Ignatieff
- Preceded by: Paul Martin (Note: Bill Graham served as interim leader from March 19 to December 2, 2006.)
- Succeeded by: Michael Ignatieff
Ministerial positions held
Minister of Foreign Affairs
In office 4 November 2015 – 10 January 2017
Prime Minister	Justin Trudeau
Preceded by	Rob Nicholson
Succeeded by	Chrystia Freeland
Minister of the Environment
In office 20 July 2004 – 6 February 2006
Prime Minister	Paul Martin
Preceded by	David Anderson
Succeeded by	Rona Ambrose
Minister of Intergovernmental Affairs
In office 25 January 1996 – 11 December 2003
Prime Minister	Jean Chrétien
Preceded by	Marcel Massé
Succeeded by	Pierre Pettigrew
President of the Queen's Privy Council for Canada
In office 25 January 1996 – 11 December 2003
Prime Minister	Jean Chrétien
Preceded by	Marcel Massé
Succeeded by	Denis Coderre
Diplomatic positions
Canadian Ambassador to France and Monaco
In office 1 June 2022 – 16 December 2025
Prime Minister	Justin Trudeau; Mark Carney
Preceded by	Isabelle Hudon
Succeeded by	Nathalie Drouin
Special Envoy of Canada to the European Union
In office 1 May 2017 – 1 October 2025
Prime Minister	Justin Trudeau; Mark Carney
Preceded by	Position established
Succeeded by	John Hannaford
Canadian Ambassador to Germany
In office 1 May 2017 – 1 June 2022
Prime Minister	Justin Trudeau
Preceded by	Marie Gervais-Vidricaire
Succeeded by	John Horgan (2023)

Member of Parliament for Saint-Laurent Saint-Laurent—Cartierville (1996–2015)
- In office 25 March 1996 – 6 February 2017
- Preceded by: Shirley Maheu
- Succeeded by: Emmanuella Lambropoulos

Personal details
- Born: 28 September 1955 (age 71) Quebec City, Quebec, Canada
- Citizenship: Canada; France
- Party: Liberal
- Spouse: Janine Krieber (m. 1986)
- Children: 1
- Education: Laval University (BA, MA); Sciences Po (PhD)
- Occupation: Diplomat; academic; politician

Stéphane Maurice Dion (Note: French: [stefan mɔʁɪs djɔ̃]; Canadian French: [d͡zjɔ̃]) (born 28 September 1955) is a Canadian diplomat, academic and former politician who served as the Canadian ambassador to France and Monaco from 2022 to 2025 and special envoy to the European Union from 2017 to 2025. Previously, he served as Leader of the Opposition and Leader of the Liberal Party from 2006 to 2008, and was member of Parliament (MP) 1996 to 2017.

Before entering politics, Dion was a professor of political science at the Université de Montréal. His research focused on Canadian federalism and public administration. Throughout his tenure in government, Dion held a number of portfolios. He was first named Minister of Intergovernmental Affairs by Prime Minister Chrétien in 1996, following the aftermath of the 1995 Quebec sovereignty referendum. His reference question to the Supreme Court of Canada, produced Reference Re Secession of Quebec and his Clarity Act, which provided guidelines for subsequent referendums. He returned to the backbench in 2003 when Paul Martin became the prime minister and dropped a number of ministers in an effort to disassociate himself from the former Chrétien government. After the 2004 election however, he returned to Cabinet as Minister of Environment, where he was in charge of implementing the Kyoto Protocol and chaired COP 11/CMP 1 when Montreal hosted the UN climate conference in 2005.

The Liberal government lost the 2006 election and Martin resigned as leader. Dion campaigned to replace him and subsequently won the party leadership election. Dion ran on an environmental platform in the 2008 federal election, but was defeated by the Conservatives led by Prime Minister Stephen Harper in one of the Liberals' worst electoral showings. After a subsequent parliamentary dispute, he was replaced as leader by Michael Ignatieff. Dion continued to sit as the member of Parliament for Saint-Laurent. In 2015, the Liberal Party returned to power and Dion was named Minister of Foreign Affairs under Prime Minister Justin Trudeau, serving until 2017, when he left politics to enter the diplomatic service.

== Early and personal life ==
Dion was born on 28 September 1955 in Quebec City, the second of five children. His mother, Denyse (née Kormann), was a real-estate agent born in Paris, France, and his father, Léon Dion, was a Quebec academic. Dion holds dual citizenship in France because of his French-born mother. Dion was raised in a modest home on boulevard Liégeois in Sillery, today part of Quebec City. While growing up, he remembers being taunted for his family's secularism in a society which was then predominantly Roman Catholic.

Dion was involved with the sovereignty movement, first as a teenager attending a Jesuit college in Quebec City, and later as a university student campaigning for Parti Québécois candidate Louise Beaudoin in the 1976 election. Dion described his experience as follows:

Because the party was there... I wanted to challenge my dad... the way to become an adult sometimes is to say the contrary to your father. Each evening, I would try out a new argument I had heard on the separatist network and my father was demolishing it... My father very quietly and very respectfully was refuting me, without insulting me.

Dion has said that his involvement as "an activist for the separatist cause" ended during a five-hour discussion with a federalist household while he was going door-to-door for the PQ, but he did not openly commit to federalism until much later. At the time of the 1980 referendum, his sentiments were neutral. In his own words, the 'no' victory left him "neither moved nor outraged. To tell the truth, I felt no particular feeling." (Moi, je ne me sentais ni ému ni révolté. À vrai dire, je n'éprouvais aucun sentiment particulier.)

He studied political science at Université Laval in the department co-founded by his father; this was also where he met his future wife, Janine Krieber, a fellow student in the same program. In April 1986, Stéphane Dion married Krieber, and later the same year, they travelled to Peru to adopt their only child, Jeanne Krieber-Dion. His wife is an "expert in strategic studies and counter-terrorism issues," who teaches political science and sociology at Royal Military College Saint-Jean in Saint-Jean-sur-Richelieu.

== Education and academic career (1977–1996) ==
After Dion obtained BA and MA degrees in 1977 and 1979 respectively (his master's thesis presented an analysis of the evolution of Parti Québécois electoral strategies), he and Krieber departed together for France.

Dion spent four years in Paris, living with Janine in the Montmartre district and studying public administration under the supervision of noted sociologist Michel Crozier. After receiving a doctorate (doctorat d'état) in sociology from the Institut d'études politiques de Paris (commonly known as Sciences Po), Dion worked briefly as a teaching assistant at the Université de Moncton in 1984 before moving on to the Université de Montréal to assume an assistant professor position. Dion taught there from 1984 to January 1996, specializing in public administration and organizational analysis and theory, and was a guest scholar at the Brookings Institution in Washington, D.C., during a 1990–91 sabbatical leave.

After the failure of the Meech Lake Accord in 1990, Dion directed his intellectual inquiry towards an analysis of Quebec nationalism. His decisive conversion to federalism, as he later recounted to journalist Michel Vastel, occurred as he was preparing for a presentation in Washington:

I sat down at my computer at 11 o'clock, and, at noon, I had a text that was so interesting that the Americans wanted to publish it. It was on that day that I realized I was truly a federalist. (Je me suis assis devant mon ordinateur à 11 h et, à midi, j'avais un texte tellement intéressant que les Américains ont voulu le publier. C'est ce jour-là que je me suis rendu compte que j'étais vraiment fédéraliste.)

In this period, the sovereignty movement had begun to promote the idea that federalism was inefficient for Quebec due to the duplication and overlap between the two levels of government. An expert in public administration, Dion emerged as a key figure in publicly criticizing this line of argument. His appearances on Le Point, a Télévision de Radio-Canada current affairs program, brought him to the attention of Aline Chrétien, who in the days following the close referendum defeat urged her husband, Prime Minister Jean Chrétien, to recruit him.

Between 1987 and 1995, Dion published a number of books and articles on political science, public administration and management. A collection of Dion's speeches and writings on Canadian unity was published under the title Straight Talk (Le pari de la franchise) in 1999. Dion was also a guest scholar at the Laboratoire d'économie publique de Paris from 1994 to 1995, a co-editor of the Canadian Journal of Political Science from 1990 to 1993, and a research fellow at the Canadian Centre for Management Development (now part of the Canada School of Public Service) from 1990 to 1991.

== Political career (1996–2017) ==
=== Minister of Intergovernmental Affairs (1996–2003) ===
In anticipation of by-elections in early 1996, Prime Minister Jean Chrétien appointed two new "star candidates" from Quebec — Stéphane Dion and Pierre Pettigrew – to Cabinet. On 25 January 1996, Dion was named Minister of Intergovernmental Affairs, Pettigrew was named Minister for International Cooperation, and both were sworn into the Queen's Privy Council for Canada.

Chrétien felt safe in appointing Dion to Cabinet because Dion was slated to run in Saint-Laurent—Cartierville, the second-safest Liberal riding in Quebec. In 25 March by-election, he was easily elected. This was not without precedent; in 1941, Mackenzie King had appointed Louis St. Laurent to Cabinet after nominating him to run in a safe Quebec riding. Dion would hold the riding in general election of 1997, and was re-elected again in the 2000, 2004, 2006, 2008, 2011, and 2015 elections. Dion continued to serve as Minister of Intergovernmental Affairs until the end of Jean Chrétien's ministry on 12 December 2003.

==== Clarity of referendum question ====
In his responsibilities as Intergovernmental Affairs minister in the Jean Chrétien government, Dion was tasked with challenging the arguments of the Quebec sovereignty movement much more vigorously than in the pre-referendum period. The people of Quebec voted against the sovereignty option by a razor-thin margin (50.58% to 49.42%). Many federalists in Ottawa were caught off-guard by the results and believed that the referendum results would have no legal standing under Canadian law. The strongest complaints were on the presumed ambiguity of the 1995 question and that Quebec had tabled a law reserving the right for the National Assembly to declare independence unilaterally if constitutional negotiations with the Government of Canada failed.

==== Supreme Court reference re secession of Quebec ====
On 30 September 1996, Dion submitted three questions to the Supreme Court of Canada constituting the Supreme Court Reference re Secession of Quebec:

1. Under the Constitution of Canada, can the National Assembly, legislature, or government of Quebec effect the secession of Quebec from Canada unilaterally?
2. Does international law give the National Assembly, legislature, or government of Quebec the right to effect the secession of Quebec from Canada unilaterally? In this regard, is there a right to self-determination under international law that would give the National Assembly, legislature or government of Quebec the right to effect the secession of Quebec from Canada unilaterally?
3. In the event of a conflict between domestic and international law on the right of the National Assembly, legislature, or government of Quebec to effect the secession of Quebec from Canada unilaterally, which would take precedence in Canada?

As soon as these questions were made public, both parties of the National Assembly, the Bloc Québécois and numerous federalists denounced Ottawa's gesture. An Act respecting the exercise of the fundamental rights and prerogatives of the Québec people and the Québec State was passed in the National Assembly of Quebec by the Parti Québécois government two days after the Clarity Act had been introduced in the Canadian House of Commons.

On 20 August 1998, the Supreme Court answered, concluding that Quebec does not have the right to secede unilaterally under Canadian or international law. However, the federal government would have to enter into negotiations with the Quebec government if Quebecers expressed a clear will to secede. It confirmed that the Canadian Parliament had the power to determine whether or not a referendum question was clear enough to trigger such negotiations. The Canadian constitution would remain in effect until terms of secession were agreed to by all parties involved, and these terms would have to respect principles of democracy, minority and individual rights as outlined in the Canadian constitution.

Both the Government of Quebec and the Government of Canada publicly stated that they were very pleased with the opinion of the Supreme Court, which stated both that Quebec could not legally separate unilaterally from Canada and that the Parliament of Canada would have a 'political obligation' to enter into separation negotiations with Quebec in the event that a clear majority of its populace were to vote in favour of independence.

==== Three letters ====
The Supreme Court reference launched a public debate between Dion and members of the Parti Québécois government in open letters published in the press. Following Lucien Bouchard's open letter to the Premier of New Brunswick, Frank McKenna, in 1997 defending the legality of a unilateral secession, Dion wrote the first of three open letters to leaders in the sovereignty movement. Dion challenged three assertions that Bouchard had made: that a unilateral declaration of independence is supported by international law; that a majority of "50% plus one" was a sufficient threshold for secession; and that international law would protect the territorial integrity of Quebec following a secession. Against the first assertion, Dion argued that the vast majority of international law experts "believe that the right to declare secession unilaterally does not belong to constituent entities of a democratic country such as Canada." In regard to the simple majority argument, Dion argued that due to the momentous changes to Quebecers' lives that would result from secession, a simple majority that could disappear in the face of difficulties would be insufficient to ensure the political legitimacy of the sovereigntist project. In regard to the territorial integrity of Quebec, Dion retorts that "there is neither a paragraph nor a line in international law that protects Quebec's territory but not Canada's. International experience demonstrates that the borders of the entity seeking independence can be called into question, sometimes for reasons based on democracy."

Dion's second open letter, to Quebec's intergovernmental affairs minister Jacques Brassard, came on 19 November 1997. Dion expanded upon his earlier arguments against the territorial integrity of Quebec following secession by highlighting the inconsistency in the argument that Canada is divisible but Quebec is not. Secondly, Dion underscored that without recognition by the Government of Canada and when opposed by a strong minority of citizens, a unilateral declaration of independence faces much difficulty in gaining international recognition.

In Dion's third open letter to Premier Lucien Bouchard came on 25 August 1998, shortly after the Supreme Court ruling on Secession had been handed down. He criticized the Quebec premier for accepting some aspects of the ruling (such as the political obligation for the Government of Canada to negotiate secession following a clear expression of will from the people of Quebec) and not other sections of the ruling (such as the need for a clear majority on a clear question and the unconstitutionality of a unilateral declaration of independence). In regard to the ruling, Dion makes three claims: that the federal government has a role in the selection of the question and the level of support required for it to pass, that secession can only be achieved through negotiation rather than a "unilateral declaration of independence", and that the terms of negotiation could not be decided solely by the Government of Quebec.

==== First International Conference on Federalism ====
Dion organized and hosted the First International Conference on Federalism in Mont Tremblant in October 1999 to foster international support for the cause of federalism in Canada. Quebec sovereigntist leaders were granted a prominent role in the conference and used their floor time to denounce Canadian federalism to an international audience to the great annoyance of their federalist host. But Dion's views got a big boost during the closing speech by United States President Bill Clinton. Clinton appeared to echo the Supreme Court Reference, warning that "when a people thinks it should be independent in order to have a meaningful political existence, serious questions should be asked.... Are minority rights as well as majority rights respected? How are we going to co-operate with our neighbours?". Clinton argued that federalism allows peoples seeking recognition of their identity a way to do so without isolating themselves in a nation-state. The speech laid to rest any doubts about the U.S. position on the legality and desirability of unilateral secession in Quebec.

"No, Mr Dion, it's not paranoia, people really do hate you!" (cartoon by Serge Chapleau, 1997)

==== Clarity Act ====
The Supreme Court reference and three letters formed the basis for the Clarity Act (Bill C-20) presented by Dion to the House of Commons on 13 December 1999. The legislation established the conditions under which the Government of Canada would enter into negotiations that might lead to secession following a vote by one of the provinces. It stipulated that in order to lead to separation negotiations, a referendum on independence in a given province would have to have "clearly" (according to the judgement of the House of Commons) framed its question to voters in terms of independence, and that the result would have to be a "clear majority" in favour, rather than a "50% plus one" majority. It was passed by the House on 15 March 2000.

=== Views on federalism ===
Dion has often been described in Quebec as a Trudeau centralist due to his strong defence of Canadian federalism and forceful arguments against Quebec sovereigntists. However, his position on federalism is far more nuanced. It would be most accurate to describe him as a federal autonomist. While Dion supports cooperation, flexibility, and interdependence in the Canadian federation, he unequivocally argues against jurisdictional intrusion, stating

[T]he Constitution must be respected. We must do away with the all-too-convenient excuse that a given governmental initiative responds to a need that is too urgent to be stymied by issues of "jurisdiction". Infringement of jurisdiction creates confusion which damages the quality of public policy.

Dion's position on provincial rights is not only the result of respect for the Constitution of Canada, but also a strategy to prevent the "joint decision trap" in which the capacity of a government's ability to act is restricted by the need for approval from the other constituent governments.

Dion has contested the political concentration on the division of powers between the federal and provincial governments, arguing that:

[I]dentity, rather than the division of powers, that is at the source of our unity problem. Francophone Quebecers want the assurance that their language and culture can flourish with the support of other Canadians. They want to feel that their language and culture are seen by other Canadians as an important asset, rather than a burden. They want the assurance that they can be both Quebecers and Canadians, and that they don't have to choose between Quebec and Canada.

In the same vein, Dion was the planner of the 1999 Social Union Framework Agreement, which, according to rabble.ca journalist Duncan Cameron, limited the national spending jurisdiction. Dion has described Quebec's Bill 101 as "a great law".

=== Gomery inquiry and 2004 election ===
Dion had a prominent role within the Chrétien administration at the time of the sponsorship scandal, and his position as "National Unity" minister (an unofficial term for the Minister of Intergovernmental Affairs) made him a figure of particular interest to the subsequent Commission of Inquiry into the Sponsorship Program and Advertising Activities (the Gomery Commission). He stated before the Gomery Commission that although in mid-2001 he was aware of the disproportionately large percentage of sponsorship funds going to Quebec, he was never directly involved in the administration of the program. Indeed, Dion had been critical of the program while in cabinet, and openly doubted that it would do much to sway Quebecers from sovereignty. Along with most of the other ministers in the Chrétien cabinet, Dion was exonerated of all responsibility in the affair in the Phase I report of the Gomery Commission:

"On the evidence there is no basis for attributing blame or responsibility to any other Minister of the Chrétien Cabinet [excepting Jean Chrétien and Alfonso Gagliano], since they, like all members of Parliament, were not informed of the initiatives being authorized by Mr. [Jean] Pelletier and their funding from the Unity Reserve."

In early 2007, after winning the Liberal Party leadership, Dion suggested that Marc-Yvan Côté's lifetime ban against rejoining the party may have been an excessive punishment for Côté's involvement in the scandal. He later clarified his remarks, saying that he would not take any steps to reinstate Côté's party membership and that such reinstatement would probably not occur. Dion has also defended Jean Pelletier, saying that the former Mayor of Quebec City had "served the country well for decades."

After Paul Martin's assumption of the office of Prime Minister, Dion was dropped from Cabinet as part of a general effort to dissociate the new Liberal government from the outgoing Chrétien administration. He was also criticized by Jean Lapierre, Martin's new Quebec Lieutenant. Lapierre was a Quebec nationalist and founder of the Bloc Québécois and his views on intergovernmental relations differed significantly from Dion's. At one stage in the buildup to the 2004 election, Lapierre described Dion's Clarity Act as "useless", and although Manitoba Premier Gary Doer said the legislation was "extremely popular" in Western Canada, Martin defended Lapierre by saying that the Act would make little difference under his administration. An unconfirmed CTV report in 2004 claimed that Martin's organizers were planning a nomination challenge in Dion's riding.

=== Minister of the Environment (2004–2006) ===
On 20 July 2004, Paul Martin appointed Dion the Minister of the Environment. Shortly after his appointment, a Globe and Mail article described Dion as being "bent on transforming the environment dossier from the traditional tree-hugger's last stand into a forward-thinking economic portfolio.". Dion championed a "new industrial revolution" focused on "environmentally sustainable technologies and products", and he sought to nurture a collaborative relationship with big business rather than a confrontational one. His maiden speech before the Calgary Chamber of Commerce illustrates just how accommodating he was ready to be: "Calgary is one of Canada's most impressive economic engines.... Alberta could soon be the second-largest oil-exporting jurisdiction on Earth, behind Saudi Arabia. This is tremendous blessing for Canada." In October 2005, Dion nominated oil and gas executive Allan Amey to head up the government's $1-billion Clean Fund, the largest single element in Dion's Kyoto implementation strategy.

Dion's ministry declined to protect Sakinaw and Cultus sockeye salmon under the Species at Risk Act because it "could cost the sockeye fishing industry $125 million in lost revenue by 2008," This led to some criticism from environmentalists.

Dion earned high praise for his work chairing the U.N. Climate Change summit (COP 11/MOP 1) in Montreal in 2005. Later, when Dion's record as environment minister was under scrutiny in the closing days of the Liberal leadership campaign, former Sierra Club of Canada director and current leader of the Green Party of Canada Elizabeth May came to his defence, calling him a "very very good environment minister."

The government did not make significant progress towards reducing Canada's greenhouse gas emissions during Dion's brief tenure in office. In April 2005, Dion unveiled his "Project Green" to combat climate change, but the program was immediately criticized by some environmental groups for being too timid and for lacking in meaningful regulations. Johanne Gélinas, Canada's environment commissioner, criticized the government's stewardship of marine areas and national parks, as well as its efforts to ensure the safety of drinking water.

In February 2006, after the Liberals had been defeated and the Conservatives had taken over the reins of government, Dion said that Canada would very likely not be able to reach its targets under the Kyoto Protocol. Nevertheless, he argued that this was missing the point:

"Everyone is saying target, target. But ... it is to be more than to reach a target. It's to change the economy. It's to have resource productivity, energy efficiency when we know that energy will be the next crisis for the economy of the world.... All my ministries will be green. Maybe I'll make one department of industry and the environment – a department of sustainability. That's not a commitment, but if you want to change the mind, you have to change structure...."

=== 2006 Liberal leadership election ===
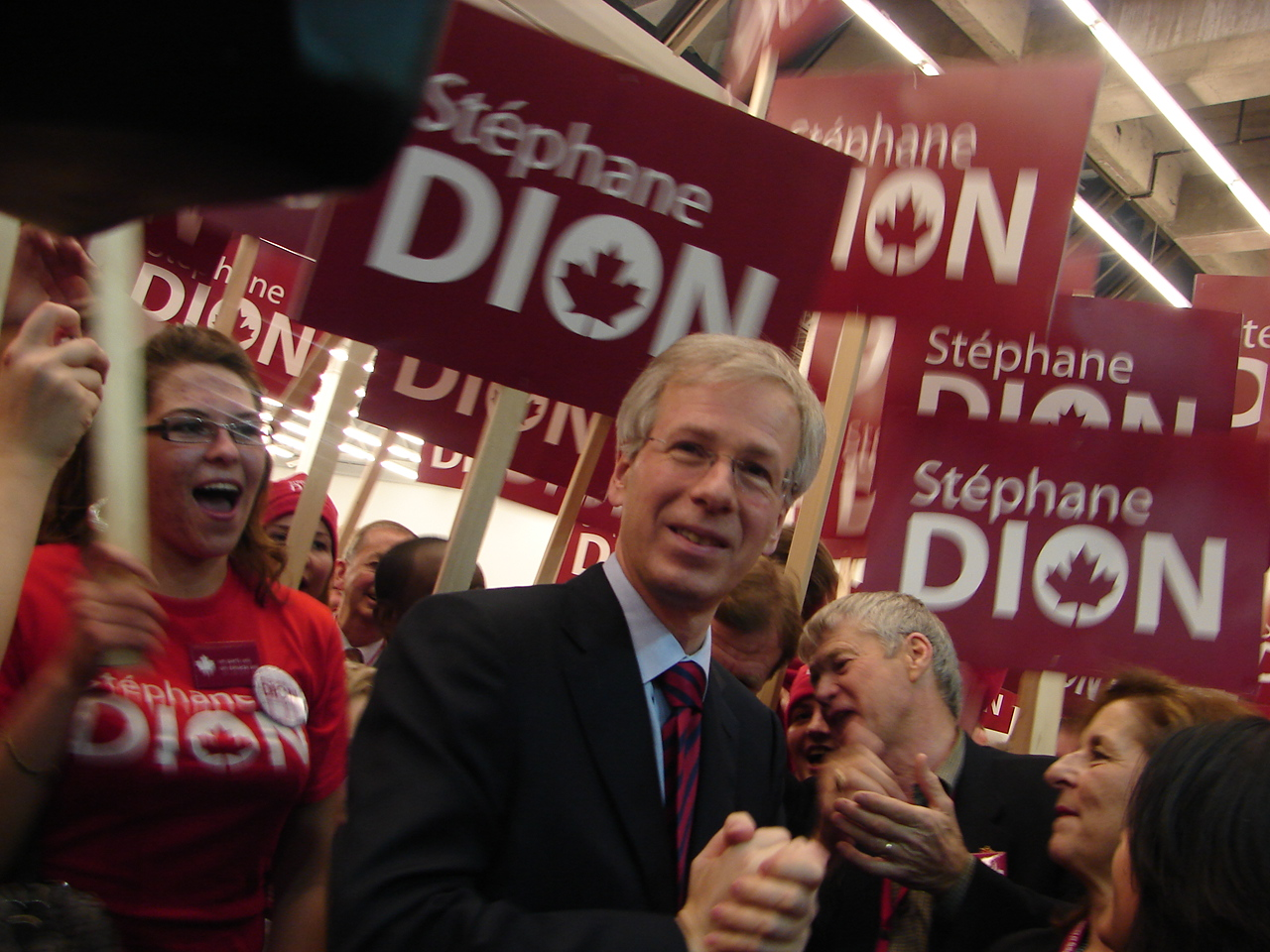
Dion, surrounded by supporters, at the 2006 Liberal leadership convention.

Stéphane Dion announced his candidacy on 7 April, the day of the official beginning of the Liberal leadership race. His leadership campaign was referred to as the three-pillar approach. This approach focused on social justice, economic prosperity, and environmental sustainability, and a claim that a combination of these pillars would bring Canada into the 21st century. He said that his campaign would focus on sustainable development of the economy and creating a "hyper-educated" Canadian workforce in order to compete with China.

Dion was a lower-key figure during most of the leadership race, with much of the media and political attention being centred on the race's two most high-profile candidates, Michael Ignatieff and former Ontario New Democratic Party premier Bob Rae. Federal NDP leader Jack Layton described Dion as "A man of principle and conviction and therefore almost certain not to be elected leader of the Liberal party." For much of the campaign, front-runner Ignatieff had the strongest support in Dion's home province of Quebec. Dion's level of support was similar to that of former Ontario cabinet minister Gerard Kennedy, both candidates being in a distant third or fourth place, though still significantly higher than the other four leadership contestants.

On 2 December 2006, at the Liberal Party leadership convention, Dion finished third after the first ballot, garnering 17.8 per cent of the delegates. After the second ballot, Kennedy threw his support behind Dion. Earlier, the two leadership contenders had allegedly struck a pact in which the first off the ballot would throw his support to the other. Pundits said that this surprise move had caught the Ignatieff and Rae strategists off guard. When the totals of the third ballot were released, Dion held a narrow lead with 37 per cent, followed closely by Ignatieff with 34.5%. Rae, with only 28.5 per cent, freed his delegates, many of whom backed Dion, as did former leadership candidates Ken Dryden and Joe Volpe. On the fourth ballot, Dion captured 54.7 per cent of votes cast and was declared the leader of the Liberal Party of Canada.

After the election win, Federal NDP leader Jack Layton urged Dion to renounce his dual citizenship with France saying that "I would prefer that a leader of a party hold only Canadian citizenship, because one represents many Canadians, and for me that means that it's better to remain the citizen of one country." Dion dismissed such calls.

=== Leader of the Official Opposition (2006–2008) ===
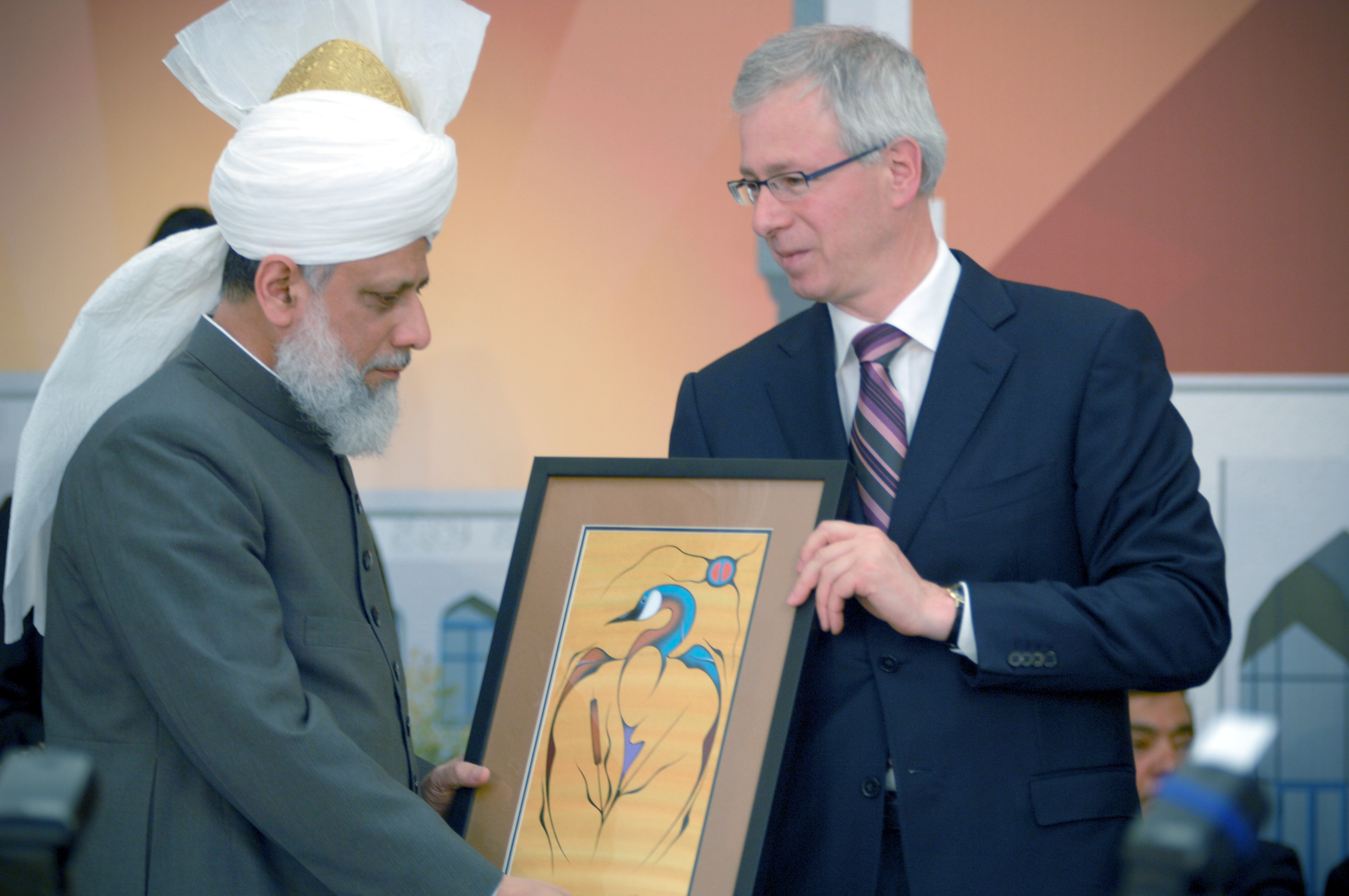
Mirza Masroor Ahmad (left), leader of the Ahmadiyya Muslim Community, with Stéphane Dion (right), who was one of multiple party leaders to attend the grand opening of Baitun Nur, the largest mosque in Canada on 5 July 2008

As rumours circulated of a possible election in early 2007, Dion bolstered the image of a Liberal Party renewed and healed of its internal divisions by appointing many of his former leadership rivals to key campaign positions. Ignatieff was named deputy leader, Rae and Scott Brison became platform development co-chairs, Kennedy was named special adviser for election readiness and renewal, Martha Hall Findlay was charged with platform outreach, and Ken Dryden, who received special acknowledgement from Dion for being "the heart of our party", was tasked "to be everywhere".

In early January 2007, Dion made a leadership decision in regards to Wajid Khan, a Liberal MP who was serving as a Middle-East adviser to the Prime Minister. Dion thought it was inappropriate for a member of the Official Opposition to be serving the government so he told Khan to give up the position. Dion was confident that Khan would stay with the caucus and give up advising the Prime Minister, but Khan chose to cross the floor, and join the Conservative caucus instead.

On 18 January 2007, Dion unveiled the remainder of his shadow cabinet. Shortly after Dion led the Liberal caucus in its rejection of the 2007 Conservative budget, arguing that it failed Canadians on economic prosperity, social justice and environmental sustainability.

In response, the Conservatives would launch a series of attack ads aimed directly at Dion, attacking his leadership abilities and record as environment minister. Similar ads attacking Dion would appear in November over statements that Dion would prefer new spending on health care and social programs to the tax cuts introduced by the Conservatives.

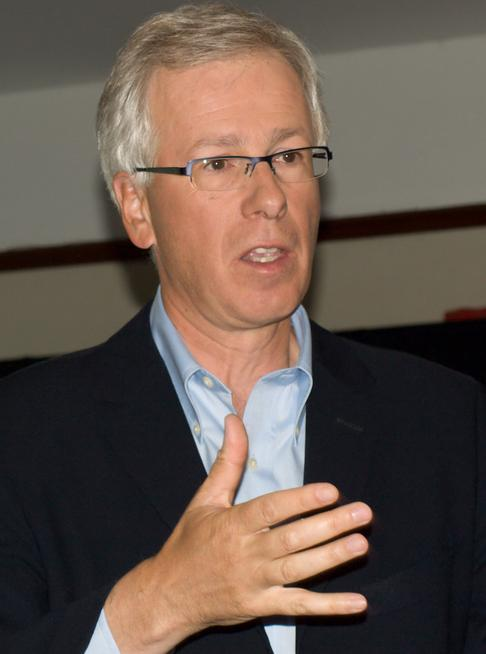
Dion at a public town hall meeting in Oakville, Ontario

==== Parliamentary Opposition ====
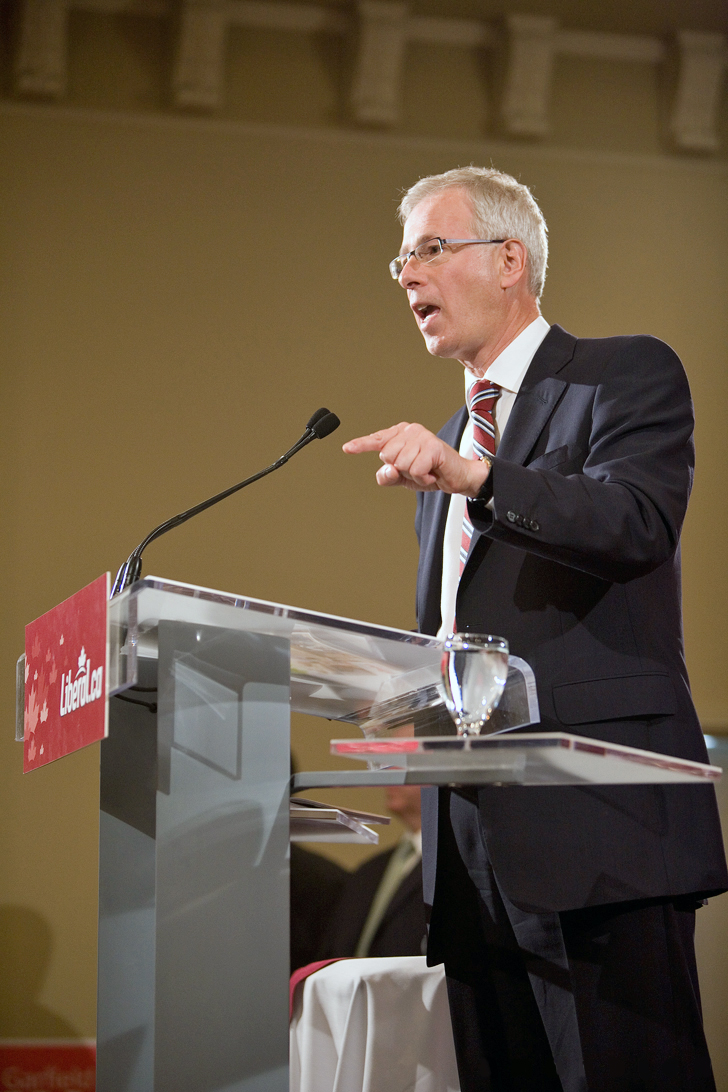
Stéphane Dion addresses a crowd during the 2008 Canadian Federal Election.

On 1 February, Dion tabled a motion challenging the Conservatives to reaffirm Canada's commitment to the Kyoto Protocol, attempting to capitalize on a 2002 letter in which Prime Minister Harper described the Accord as a "socialist scheme" that is based on "tentative and contradictory scientific evidence" and designed to suck money out of rich countries. Tory environment minister John Baird responded by blaming the Liberals for what he described as a "shameful record over 13 years of inaction on the environment," while Harper said that his government would "stabilize emissions." Dion's non-binding motion passed on 5 February.

On 27 February, Dion's Liberals, together with Bloc Québécois and NDP members of Parliament, voted down a Harper government proposal to extend two controversial provisions of the Anti-Terrorism Act for another three years. Dion argued that the measures — which allowed police to arrest and detain terror suspects for three days without a warrant and which allowed judges to force witnesses to testify in terror cases — "have done nothing to fight against terrorism" and "have not been helpful and have continued to create some risk for civil liberties."

On 12 April 2007, Dion announced that the Liberals would not run a candidate against Green Party leader Elizabeth May in the Nova Scotia riding of Central Nova (then represented by Conservative Peter MacKay) in return for the Green Party leader's agreement not to run a Green candidate in Dion's riding of Saint-Laurent—Cartierville. The deal was criticized by the Conservatives and the NDP (Layton had rejected earlier attempts by May to cut a "backroom" deal with his party), and also by some within the Liberal Party. Dion later gave reassurance that the controversial deal was "an exceptional circumstance where Liberal voters are invited to help her [May] to win against Peter MacKay."

On 8 November 2007, Dion released a policy plan, that he compared to the United Kingdom's Labour Party under former Prime Minister Tony Blair. Dion mentioned that his party will tackle poverty in Canada in order to create a "greener", "richer" and "fairer" Canada. He set up targets to reduce general poverty by 30 percent and child poverty by 50 percent as well as helping working families with work rewards as well as increasing the Canada Child Tax benefit, increasing guaranteed revenues for seniors.

In January 2008, Dion and Ignatieff went to Kandahar, Afghanistan to visit a provincial reconstruction team. The visit was supposed to be secret, but was leaked to the public by Conservative junior minister Helena Guergis. After his return, Dion angrily criticized Guergis' action, saying that she put him at risk for being attacked by the Taliban. In a letter to Harper, Dion demanded Guergis' resignation or firing, saying that Guergis committed a "gross breach of Canadian security" that raised doubts about her fitness for Cabinet.

On 3 June 2008, Stéphane Dion voted to implement a program which would "allow conscientious objectors...to a war not sanctioned by the United Nations...to...remain in Canada..."

==== Internal discord ====
The first federal by-elections contested by the Liberals under Dion's leadership took place on 18 September 2007, in three Quebec ridings: Roberval—Lac-Saint-Jean, Outremont and Saint-Hyacinthe—Bagot. The party's candidates were defeated by large margins in all three races. The Outremont by-election was deemed a crucial test for Dion's leadership by some pundits, as it had been held by the Liberals almost uninterruptedly since 1935. Others said it was a "poor measure of where the parties really stand." Dion's handpicked candidate Jocelyn Coulon, who was selected over Justin Trudeau, was defeated by the NDP's Thomas Mulcair. A Dion aide blamed the Outremont by-election on several factors, including poor organization, lack of communications, and lack of a clear policy on Quebec. In addition, the Halifax Chronicle-Herald reported that unidentified "Dion loyalists" were accusing Michael Ignatieff supporters of undermining by-election efforts. Though Ignatieff phoned up Dion to deny the allegations, The Globe and Mail suggested that the report had a negative impact on the Liberals' morale, citing the NDP's widening lead after the article's release. Undaunted, Dion declared: "From this defeat, we can learn something and work together as a united party."

On 23 September 2007, Liberal Party national director Jamie Carroll sparked controversy when, during discussions about whether francophone Quebecers should be hired in order to appeal to francophone voters, he commented: "Do we also have to hire people from the Chinese community to represent the Chinese community?" Carroll argued that the comment was taken out of context, but it nevertheless raised the hackles of many Liberals in Quebec, prompting calls from MPs Pablo Rodriguez and Liza Frulla for Carroll to be fired. Stéphane Dion stood by Carroll's version of events and rejected calls for Carroll's dismissal. On 10 October, a Liberal press release announced Carroll's resignation and commended him for his "loyalty to our leader and to our party".

Marcel Proulx resigned as Dion's Quebec lieutenant hours before the Harper government's throne speech, taking the fall for the three by-election losses. Dion first approached Montreal MPs Denis Coderre and Pablo Rodriguez to succeed Proulx, but they declined. That evening he named Senator Céline Hervieux-Payette to the vacant post. While the Party was divided on whether or not the government should be toppled on a confidence vote regarding the Throne Speech, Dion mentioned in a statement in the House of Commons on 17 October that the Liberals will support the Throne Speech but with major amendments including the Kyoto Protocol and the end of mission in Afghanistan by 2009 and had criticized the government on several aspects including the economy, seniors and child poverty, the crime policy, the Senate reform. The latter amendment proposal was rejected by the NDP, who favoured an immediate end to the mission. Dion explained the decision as that Canadians are not willing to have a third election in just over three years. All Liberal members abstained from voting on the Throne Speech on 24 October 2007, which passed 126–79.

The Liberal Party won three of four by-elections held on 17 March 2008, as Dion's former leadership rivals Bob Rae and Martha Hall Findlay won convincing victories in Toronto Centre and Willowdale, while Joyce Murray was narrowly elected in Vancouver Quadra. The Conservatives won a fourth contest in the northern Saskatchewan riding of Desnethé—Missinippi—Churchill River, which the Liberals had narrowly taken in the previous election. Dion declared the results a victory for his party, while also conceding that some Liberal support was lost to the Green Party. Some journalists described the outcome as a mixed result for both the Liberal Party and Dion's leadership.

==== 2008 federal election ====
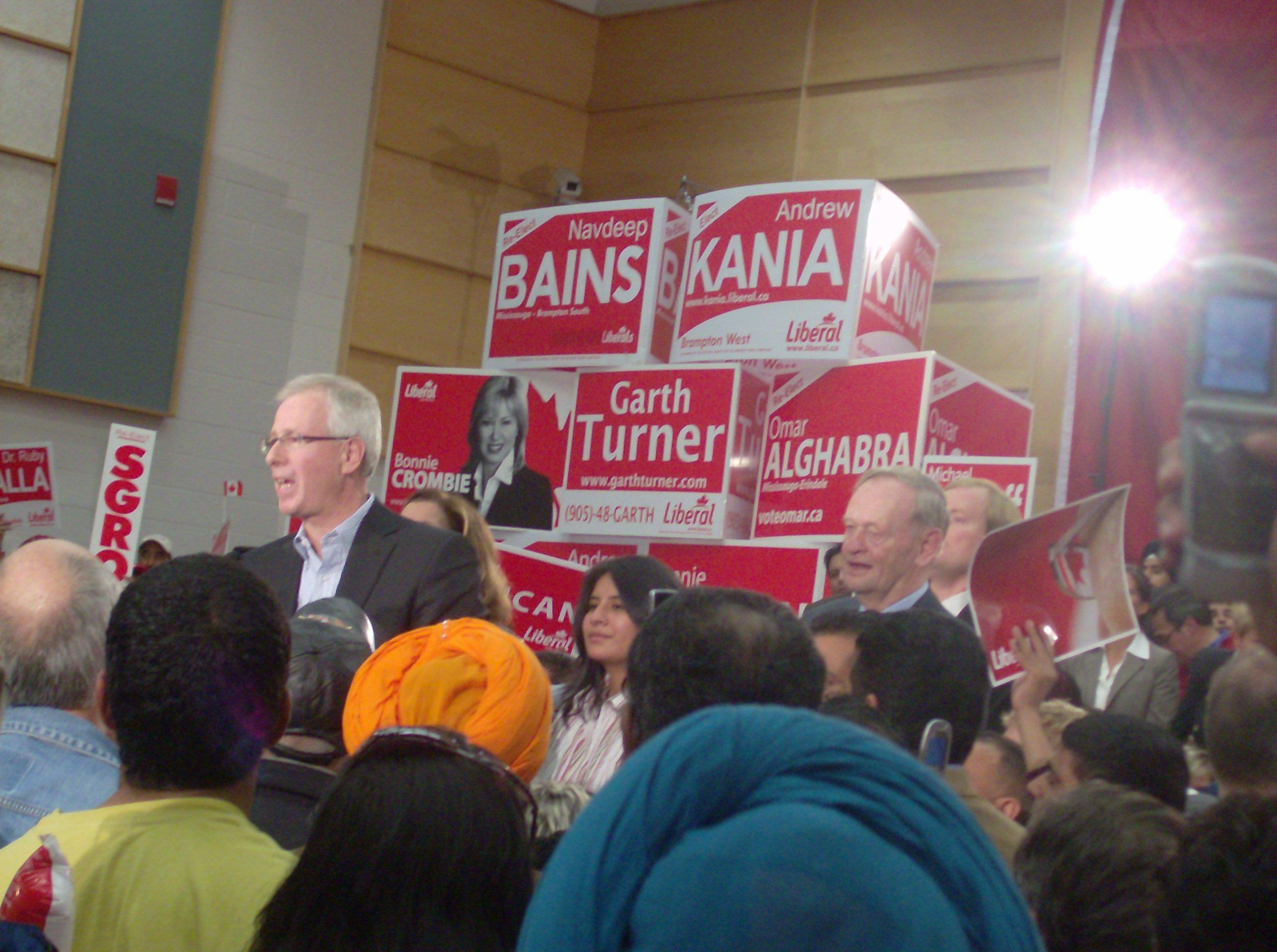
Dion makes a speech on 10 October 2008, in Brampton West. Former Prime Minister Jean Chrétien, seen here standing behind Dion, was among notable Liberals at this rally.

In 2008, as part of a measure for cutting greenhouse emissions, Dion called for a carbon price. He also praised a similar measure introduced and approved by the British Columbia government in the 2008 provincial budget as well as the province of Quebec that introduced a carbon-based tax which revenues will be used for green technologies. Critics from other parties as well as some Liberal MPs said that the concept would be "too confusing, expensive and politically risky". The plan received support from David Suzuki who added on CTV's Question Period that: "To oppose the carbon tax plan, it's just nonsense. It's certainly the way we got to go".

In June 2008, Dion unveiled the new policy called the "Green Shift" and explained that this tax shift would create an ecotax on carbon while reducing personal and corporate income taxes. He stated that the taxation on carbon would generate up to $15 billion per year in revenues to offset the reduction in income tax revenue. The plan was immediately criticized by Prime Minister Harper, who described it as a tax grab and compared it to the National Energy Program that the federal Liberal government adopted in the 1980s. On 11 September 2008, NDP leader Jack Layton also criticized the Green Shift, saying that it would hurt consumers, would be nothing more than a nuisance for energy producers, and evaluates emission equally across all sectors instead of maximizing reductions where the cost is lowest. Layton further noted that Dion's proposal does not set a target for reducing emissions.

Near the end of the campaign, Dion had an interview with CTV Halifax's anchor Steve Murphy, where Dion asked the host three times to restart the interview because he didn't understand the mixed tense and timing of a question about the economy: "If you were Prime Minister now, what would you have done about the economy and this crisis that Mr. Harper has not done?" Murphy initially agreed not to air it but network executives decided to release it, generating controversy. On election night, Dion angrily refused to speak to the CTV reporters scrumming around him, saying "The last one I want to speak first [sic] is CTV – you understand that?"

The Liberals lost support on 14 October federal election, being reduced to 77 seats, down from 103 won in the 2006 election. They captured only 26.2 per cent of the popular vote — two points lower than the disastrous showing in 1984 under John Turner and only four points ahead of the party's worst ever result in 1867. Dion became the first Liberal Opposition Leader to fail to make a net gain in seats at his first election since Lester B. Pearson in 1958. Dion said that the party lost because he did not get the Liberal message out, and took responsibility saying "If people are asking why, it's because I failed." Dion added that he never had a chance to establish his personal image with voters because of the Conservative ads depicting him as a "dithering egghead". Liberal veterans described Dion as a "lone wolf" who dismissed suggestions from his senior advisers to avoid using the Green Shift as an election platform. A party insider also said that Dion was reluctant to emphasize the Liberal team because he felt that he was being overshadowed by leadership rival Bob Rae. On 20 October, Dion announced his resignation as leader, pending the election of his successor, "because I failed."

==== 2008 parliamentary dispute ====
In November 2008, the Conservative government provided the House of Commons with a fiscal update, which included austerity measures. Since money bills are matters of confidence, the opposition was forced to consider whether to accept the motion or bring down the government. The update was ultimately rejected by the opposition parties on the grounds that it lacked any fiscal stimulus during the 2008 financial crisis. Rather than force a new election, Liberals and NDP reached a deal to form a minority coalition government, with support from the Bloc Québécois. In the agreement, Dion would have been the Prime Minister until May, when the Liberal Party would elect his successor. Dion sent a letter of the plan to Governor General Michaëlle Jean, and the opposition had scheduled a non-confidence motion for 8 December 2008. To draw public support, Prime Minister Harper and Dion both addressed the nation on 3 December 2008. Dion's Liberal rebuttal, however, was considered poor in production quality and delivered late to the networks, and some believed that this had undermined support for the coalition. On 4 December 2008, the Governor General granted Prime Minister Harper's request to suspend parliament until January 2009, thereby delaying a scheduled non-confidence vote and the likely defeat of the Conservative government.

Shortly afterwards, Dion came under increasing pressure from the party to immediately step down as Liberal leader. On 8 December, Dion announced that he would resign the leadership as soon as an interim leader was chosen by caucus; his resignation took effect two days later, upon the selection of Michael Ignatieff as interim leader. This made Dion the second permanent Liberal leader in Canadian history not to become Prime Minister, after Edward Blake in 1887. On his retirement, Dion became the shortest serving non-interim leader of the Liberal Party since Confederation—serving for approximately four months less time (740 days to 855 days) of the next shortest serving leader, Paul Martin (2003–2006). Dion delivered a farewell speech on 2 May 2009, at the Liberal Party leadership convention.

=== Post-leadership ===
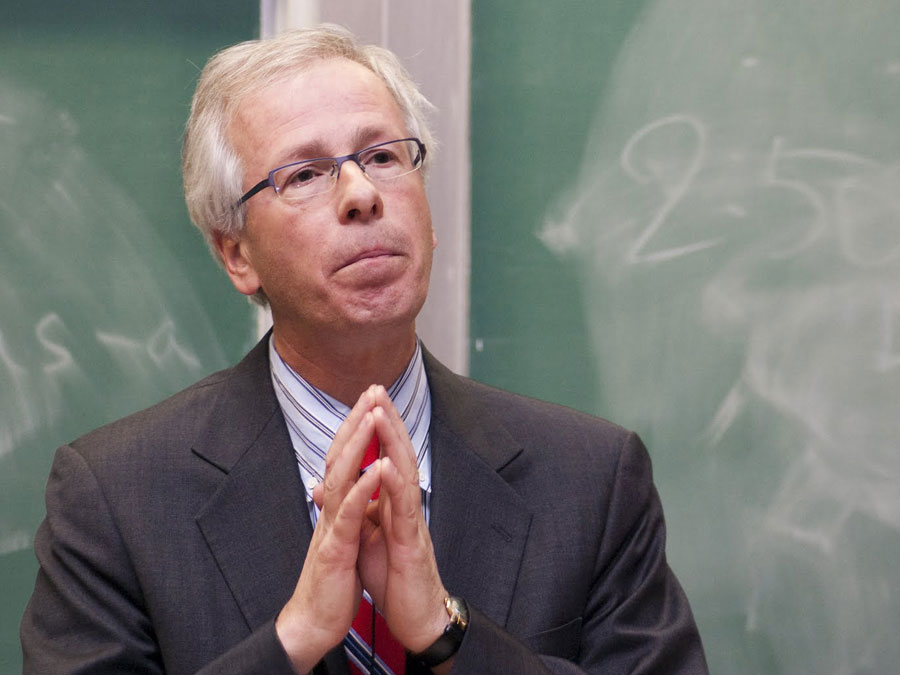
Dion speaks at Carleton University on 27 October 2009.

Ignatieff appointed a smaller shadow cabinet after being named interim leader and did not give Dion a critical role within it. Over the course of Ignatieff's time as leader Dion stayed out of the limelight, working quietly in his riding and expressing his views privately to Ignatieff.

In September 2009, it was reported that Denis Coderre, Ignatieff's Quebec lieutenant, was attempting to oust Dion and fellow Montreal-area MPs Raymonde Folco, Lise Zarac, and Bernard Patry for the next election, with the hope of replacing them with star candidates. However, Coderre ended up resigning as Quebec Lieutenant during this time over conflicting views with Ignatieff and his inner circle.

In the 2011 election, the Liberal Party placed third in a federal election for the first time in Canadian history. Dion was one of just seven Liberal MPs re-elected in his home province, he won 43.43 per cent of the popular in his riding which was the highest vote share for a Liberal in Quebec. In the 41st Parliament, Dion had a much more prominent role within the Liberal caucus than he had after his resignation as leader in 2008. Interim Liberal leader Bob Rae appointed Dion as the Liberals Critic for Intergovernmental Affairs and spokesman for la Francophonie. A month after the election Dion attended the NDP's federal convention as the observer for the Liberal Party, at that time he called on NDP leader not to appease separatists as a way to maintain his party's support in Quebec. He also criticized the NDP's policy that 50-per-cent-plus-one in a referendum would justify Quebec separating from Canada.

In November 2011, Dion was awarded with the Fray International Sustainability Award at Fray International Symposium in Mexico, for his work and advocacy towards sustainable development.

=== Minister of Foreign Affairs (2015–2017) ===
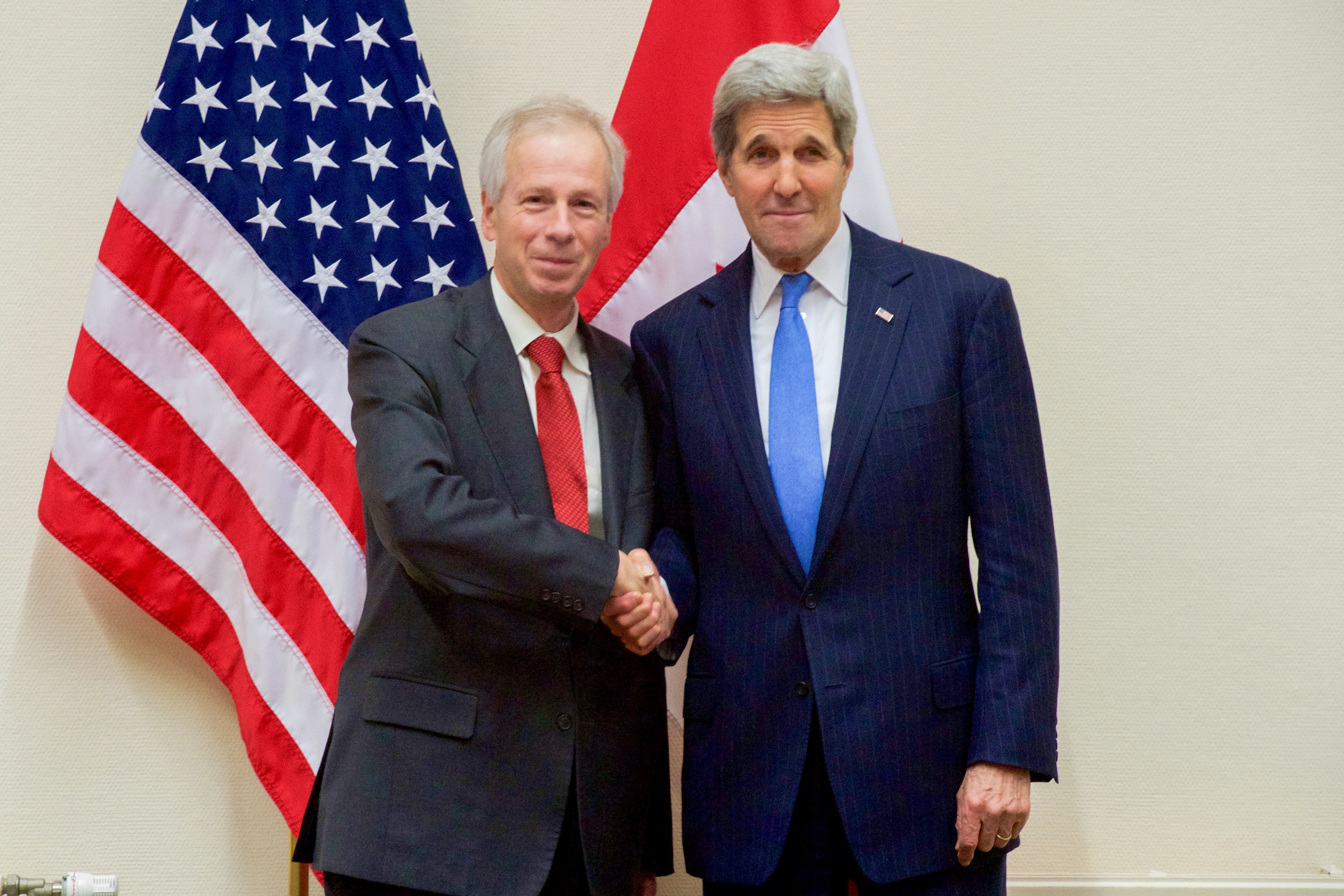
Stéphane Dion with U.S. Secretary of State John Kerry in Brussels, Belgium, 1 December 2015

The 2015 election was a resounding victory for Justin Trudeau's Liberal Party, and Dion was comfortably re-elected to an eighth term representing the newly reformulated Saint-Laurent riding. On 4 November 2015, Dion was appointed the Minister of Foreign Affairs in Justin Trudeau's cabinet. Dion was also named as chair of the cabinet's committee on environment and climate change. As a senior cabinet minister, Dion was third in the order of succession. One of his first foreign policy statements included a call to diffuse Sunni-Shiite tensions in the aftermath of Nimr al-Nimrs execution.

In a March 2016 speech at the University of Ottawa, Dion used "responsible conviction" – a term syncretized from the work of German sociologist Max Weber – to describe the Trudeau government's foreign policy. Dion sought re-engagement with the world, including authoritarian regimes such as Russia and Iran and a focus on multilateralism, climate change, and the United Nations. Dion indicated that Canada would oppose capital punishment for Canadians imprisoned abroad and would change its contribution to the fight against the Islamic State of Iraq and the Levant from providing airstrikes to providing special forces trainers. Dion also tied the concept of responsible conviction to continuing some policies of the previous Stephen Harper government in a modified manner, such as continuing its maternal and newborn health initiative but with new funding for abortion and family planning. He also justified continuing a $15 billion sale of light armored vehicles to Saudi Arabia despite its human rights abuses to protect Canadian jobs and preserve Canada's credibility in signing major international deals, but committed to reassessing the rules on Canadian export permits so that future deals would conform to Canadian interests such as human rights promotion. Dion ended his speech by rejecting the concept of Canada as an honest broker, because that term had become too associated with moral relativism and lack of conviction, instead saying that Canada had to be "a fair-minded and determined peace builder."

Dion was dropped entirely from the cabinet in Prime Minister Trudeau's 10 January 2017 cabinet shuffle and replaced as Minister of Foreign Affairs by Chrystia Freeland. The move, which was bitterly resented by Dion, was seen in part as a response to United States President-elect Donald Trump's incoming presidency.

== Post-political career (2017–present) ==
Dion announced his retirement from politics, making no mention of either potential position, in a statement released shortly after the cabinet shuffle. He confirmed, in his farewell speech to the House of Commons on 31 January 2017, that he had accepted the position of Ambassador to Germany and special envoy to the European Union instead of accepting an offer from the Université de Montréal. His resignation from Parliament officially took effect on 6 February 2017.

Dion served as Ambassador to Germany until 1 June 2022, when he was appointed Canada's Ambassador to France and Monaco while retaining his role as special envoy to the European Union. In October 2025, he informed Prime Minister Mark Carney about his impending retirement from his diplomatic posts. Dion's tenure as Ambassador ended in December 2025.

== Electoral record ==
2015 Canadian federal election: Saint-Laurent
Party	Candidate	Votes	%	±%	Expenditures
Liberal	Stéphane Dion	24,832	61.6	+18.74	
Conservative	Jimmy Yu	7,867	19.5	+0.39	
New Democratic	Alain Ackad	4,646	11.5	-17.57	
Bloc Québécois	Pascal-Olivier Dumas-Dubreuil	1,879	4.7	-1.73	
Green	John Tromp	977	2.4	+0.31	
Marxist–Leninist	Fernand Deschamps	129	0.3	–	
Total valid votes/		40,330	100.0		
Total rejected ballots		409	–	–	
Turnout		40,739	–	–	
Eligible voters		69,078			
Source: Elections Canada

2011 Canadian federal election: Saint-Laurent—Cartierville
Party	Candidate	Votes	%	±%
Liberal	Stéphane Dion	17,726	43.43	–
New Democratic	Marias Ximena Florez	11,948	29.28	–
Conservative	Svetlana Litvin Fayad	7,124	17.46	–
Bloc Québécois	William Fayad	2,981	7.3	–
Green	Tim Landry	857	2.1	–
Marxist–Leninist	Fernand Deschamps	176	0.43	–
Total valid votes		–	100.0%	

Source: Elections Canada

2008 Canadian federal election: Saint-Laurent—Cartierville
Party	Candidate	Votes	%	±%
Liberal	Stéphane Dion	25,095	61.7%	+1.9%
Conservative	Dennis Galiatsatos	6,999	17.2%	+4.0%
Bloc Québécois	Jacques Lachaine	4,611	11.3%	-3.2%
New Democratic	Jérôme Rodrigues	3,654	9.0%	+1.3%
Marxist–Leninist	Fernand Deschamps	299	0.7%	+0.3%
Total valid votes		40,658	100.0%	
Total rejected ballots		454		
Turnout		41,112	%	

2006 Canadian federal election: Saint-Laurent—Cartierville
Party	Candidate	Votes	%	±%
Liberal	Stéphane Dion	25,412	59.8%	-7.0%
Bloc Québécois	William Fayad	6,192	14.6%	-2.7%
Conservative	Ishrat Alam	5,590	13.2%	+7.0%
New Democratic	Liz Elder	3,279	7.7%	+1.5%
Green	Gilles Mercier	1,810	4.3%	+2.2%
Marxist–Leninist	Fernand Deschamps	177	0.4%	+0.1%
Total valid votes		42,460	100.0%	

2004 Canadian federal election: Saint-Laurent—Cartierville
Party	Candidate	Votes	%	±%	Expenditures
Liberal	Stéphane Dion	28,107	66.82	−6.51	$56,588
Bloc Québécois	William Fayad	7,261	17.26	+4.04	$9,302
New Democratic	Zaid Mahayni	2,630	6.25	+3.85	$11,340
Conservative	Marc Rahmé	2,606	6.20	−3.32	$10,128
Green	Almaz Aladass	875	2.08		$0
Marijuana	Alex Néron	298	0.71	–	none listed
Marxist–Leninist	Fernand Deschamps	125	0.30		none listed
Canadian Action	Ken Fernandez	84	0.20		$116
Communist	Nilda Vargas	78	0.19		$647
Total valid votes		42,064	100.00		
Total rejected ballots		400			
Turnout		42,464	54.28		
Electors on the lists		78,238			
Percentage change figures are factored for redistribution. Conservative Party percentages are contrasted with the combined Canadian Alliance and Progressive Conservative figures from 2000. Sources: Official Results, Elections Canada and Financial Returns, Elections Canada.

2000 Canadian federal election: Saint-Laurent—Cartierville
Party	Candidate	Votes	%	±%	Expenditures
Liberal	Stéphane Dion	32,861	73.58	+3.44	$44,754
Bloc Québécois	Yves Beauregard	5,838	13.07	+0.35	$11,158
Progressive Conservative	J. Pierre Rouleau	2,308	5.17	−8.74	$876
Alliance	Kaddis R. Sidaros	1,909	4.27	+2.89	$8,762
New Democratic	Piper Elizabeth Huggins	1,070	2.40	+0.56	$908
Marxist–Leninist	Jean-Paul Bedard	234	0.52		$10
Canadian Action	Ken Fernandez	232	0.52		$3,062
Communist	Oscar Chavez	206	0.46		$187
Total valid votes		44,658	100.00		
Total rejected ballots		642			
Turnout		45,300	63.06	−13.90	
Electors on the lists		71,836			
Canadian Alliance percentages are contrasted with the Reform Party figures from 1997. Sources: Official Results, Elections Canada and Financial Returns, Elections Canada.

1997 Canadian federal election: Saint-Laurent—Cartierville
Party	Candidate	Votes	%	±%	Expenditures
Liberal	Stéphane Dion	34,598	70.14	–	$39,617
Progressive Conservative	Jean-Martin Masse	6,861	13.91		$17,038
Bloc Québécois	Yves Beauregard	6,276	12.72		$20,834
New Democratic	Jeff Itcush	910	1.84		$850
Reform	Hagop Karlozian	681	1.38		$1,907
Total valid votes		49,326	100.00		
Total rejected ballots		781			
Turnout		50,107	76.96		
Electors on the lists		65,105			
Sources: Official Results, Elections Canada and Financial Returns, Elections Canada.

Canadian federal by-election, 25 March 1996: Saint-Laurent—Cartierville
Party	Candidate	Votes	%	±%	Expenditures
Liberal	Stéphane Dion	21,336	79.3	+9.5	
Bloc Québécois	Michel Sarra-Bournet	4,000	14.9	-3.8	
Progressive Conservative	G. Garo Toubi	699	13.9	+6.5	
Reform	Shaul Petel	441	1.6		
Independent	Carole Caron	229	0.9%		
New Democratic	Sara Mayo	212	0.8%	-1.2	
Total valid votes		26,917	100.0%		
Liberal hold		Swing		+6.65	
By-election due to the appointment of Shirley Maheu to the Senate on 31 January 1996.

== Honorary Degrees ==
- Stephane Dion has received many Honorary Degrees, These Include

Honorary Degrees

Location	Date	School	Degree
Spain	13 November 2002	Charles III University of Madrid	Doctorate

== See also ==
- List of foreign ministers in 2017
- Université Laval

== Notes and references ==
Parliament of Canada
Preceded by Shirley Maheu	Member of Parliament for Saint-Laurent—Cartierville; 1996–2015	Constituency abolished
New constituency	Member of Parliament for Saint-Laurent; 2015–2017	Incumbent
26th Canadian Ministry (1993–2003) – Cabinet of Jean Chrétien
Cabinet posts (2)
Predecessor	Office	Successor
Marcel Massé	Minister of Intergovernmental Affairs; 1996–2003	Pierre Pettigrew
Marcel Massé	President of the Privy Council; 1996–2003	Denis Coderre
27th Canadian Ministry (2003–2006) – Cabinet of Paul Martin
Cabinet post (1)
Predecessor	Office	Successor
David Anderson	Minister of the Environment; 2004–2006	Rona Ambrose
Party political offices
Preceded by Bill Graham; Interim	Leader of the Liberal Party; 2006–2008	Succeeded by Michael Ignatieff
Political offices
Preceded by Bill Graham	Leader of the Opposition; 2006–2008	Succeeded by Michael Ignatieff
29th Canadian Ministry (2015–2025) – Cabinet of Justin Trudeau
Cabinet post (1)
Predecessor	Office	Successor
Rob Nicholson	Minister of Foreign Affairs; 2015–2017	Chrystia Freeland
Diplomatic posts
Preceded by Marie Gervais-Vidricaire	Ambassador to Germany; 2017–2022	Succeeded by Isabelle Poupart (acting)
New office	Special Envoy to the European Union and Europe; 2017–2025	Succeeded by John Hannaford
Preceded by Isabelle Hudon	Ambassador to France and Monaco; 2022–2025	Succeeded by Nathalie Drouin
