= 2008–2009 Canadian parliamentary dispute =

Dispute regarding the royal power of prorogation in Canada

The Centre Block on Parliament Hill, location of the Parliament of Canada

The 2008–2009 Canadian parliamentary dispute, during the 40th Canadian Parliament, was triggered by the expressed intention of the opposition parties (who together held a majority of seats in the House of Commons) to defeat the Conservative minority government on a motion of non-confidence six weeks after the federal election of October 14, 2008.

The intention to vote non-confidence arose from the government's fiscal update, tabled on November 27. It included several contentious provisions that the opposition parties rejected and that the government later withdrew to resolve the crisis. The Liberal Party and New Democratic Party reached an accord to form a minority coalition government. The Bloc Québécois agreed to provide support on confidence votes, thereby enabling the coalition a working majority in the Commons. On December 4, Governor General Michaëlle Jean (the representative of the Canadian monarch and head of state, Elizabeth II) granted Prime Minister Stephen Harper (the head of government) a prorogation on the condition that parliament reconvene early in the new year; the date was set as January 26, 2009. The first session of the 40th parliament thus ended, delaying a vote of no-confidence.

After prorogation, the Liberals underwent a change in leadership and distanced themselves from the coalition agreement, while the NDP and Bloc remained committed to bringing down the government. The Conservative government's budget, unveiled on January 27, largely met the demands of the Liberals, who agreed to support it with an amendment to the budget motion.

== Background ==
Rendition of party representation in the 40th Canadian parliament decided by the 2008 election. Conservatives (143) Liberals (77) Bloc Québécois (49) New Democrats (37) Independent (2)

The 39th Canadian Parliament produced a Conservative minority government headed by Stephen Harper that lasted for two and a half years. On September 7, 2008, the Prime Minister was granted a dissolution of parliament followed by a snap election. Harper justified recommending the dissolution by stating that parliament had become dysfunctional and that his government required a new mandate.

During the election campaign, movements for strategic voting to defeat the government came from a variety of sources. The Liberals and the Green Party formed an agreement not to run candidates against their respective leaders and a national Anything But Conservative (ABC) campaign was created by Newfoundland and Labrador Premier Danny Williams. The election also took place at the height of the 2008 financial crisis, which saw governments in the United States and United Kingdom take drastic measures to stimulate their economies and bail out failing financial institutions. The Conservatives promised to stand firm with Canada's fiscal course, while the other parties began to promise greater stimulus measures.

The October 14 vote saw an increase in the Conservative seat count from 127 to 143—still a plurality—while the Liberals, led by Stéphane Dion, returned as Her Majesty's Loyal Opposition, with 77 seats, down from 103. Two other parties, the New Democratic Party (NDP), with 37 seats, up from 29 seats, and the Bloc Québécois, with 49 seats, down from 51 seats, together with two independent members of parliament, were elected to the House of Commons. A week after the election, Dion announced his plan to resign as Liberal leader, staying on as leader until a successor was chosen.

== The dispute ==
=== Catalyst and formation of a coalition ===
On November 27, Finance Minister Jim Flaherty provided the House of Commons with a fiscal update, within which were plans to cut government spending, suspend the ability of civil servants to strike until 2011, sell off some Crown assets to raise capital, and eliminate the existing $1.95 per vote subsidy parties garner in an election. Since money bills are matters of confidence, the opposition was forced to consider whether to accept the motion or bring down the government. Flaherty's update was ultimately rejected on the grounds that it lacked any fiscal stimulus during the 2008 financial crisis, for its suspension of federal civil servants' ability to strike, for suspending the right for women to seek recourse from the courts for pay equity issues, and for the change in election financing rules.

Coalition partners

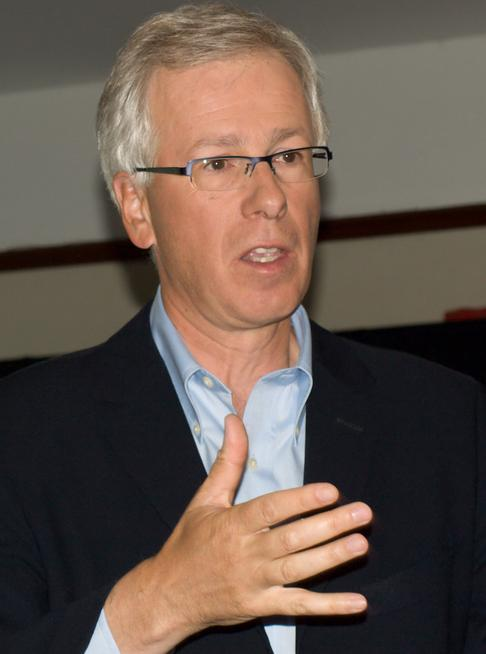
Stéphane Dion

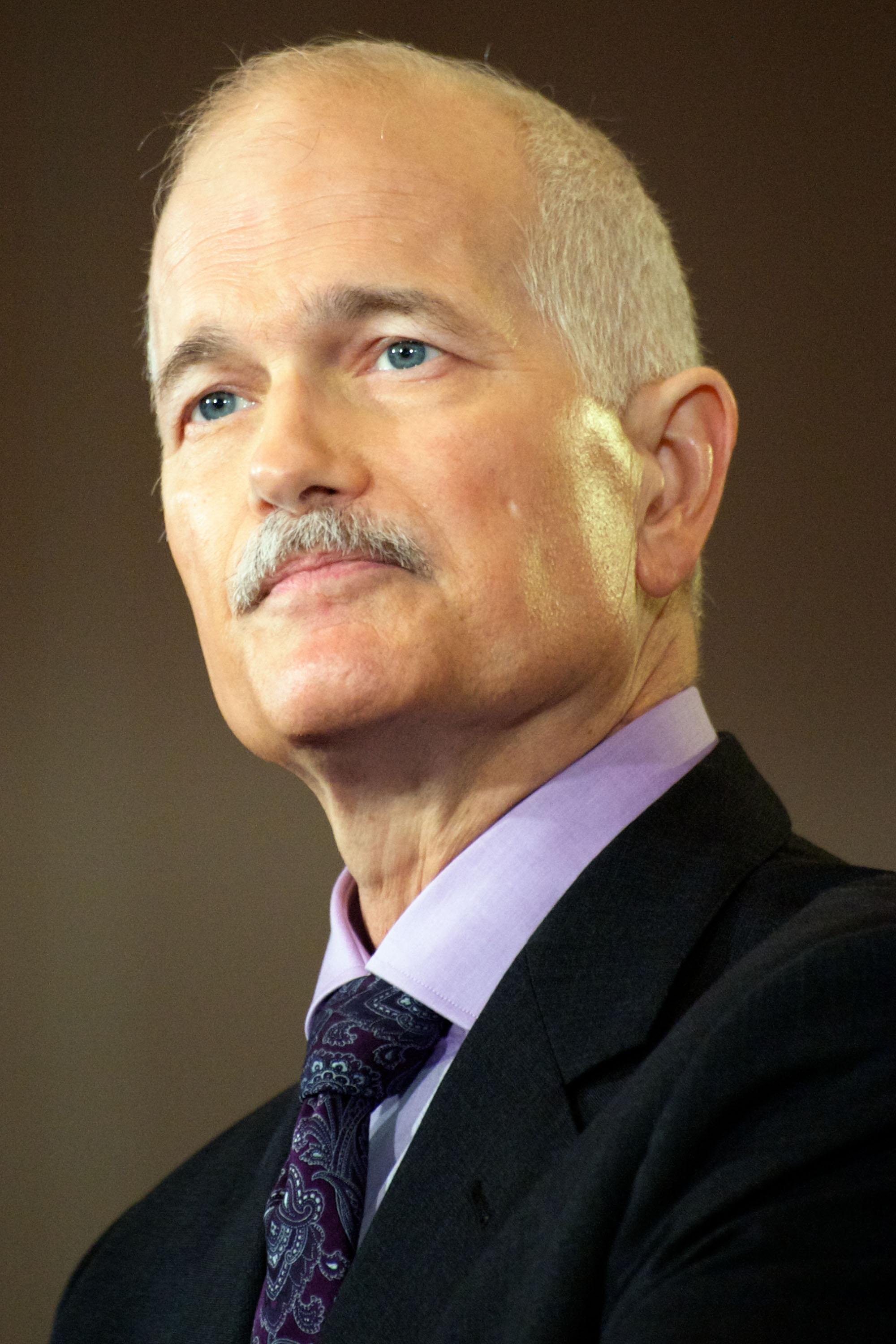
Jack Layton

Coalition supporters

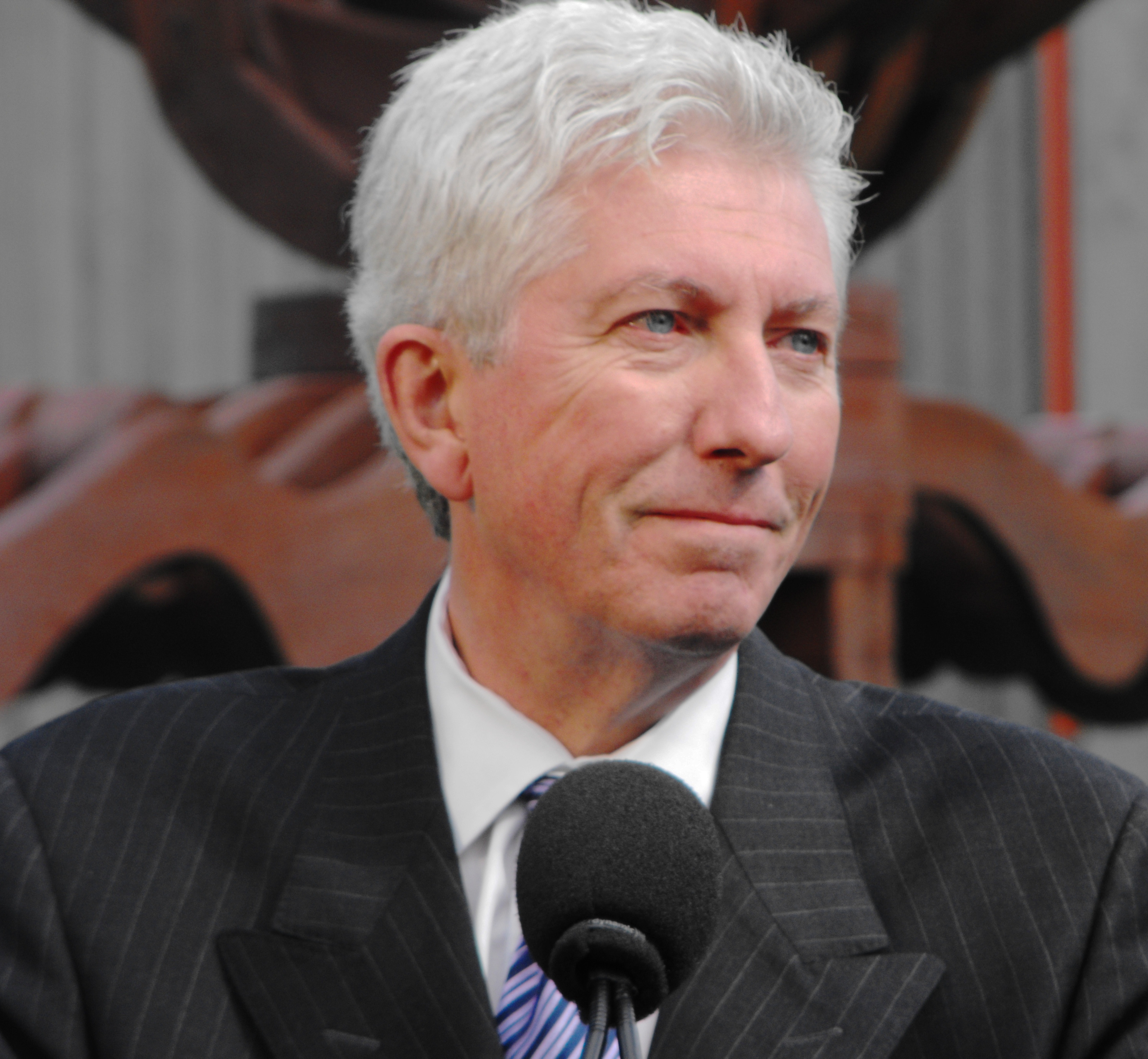
Gilles Duceppe

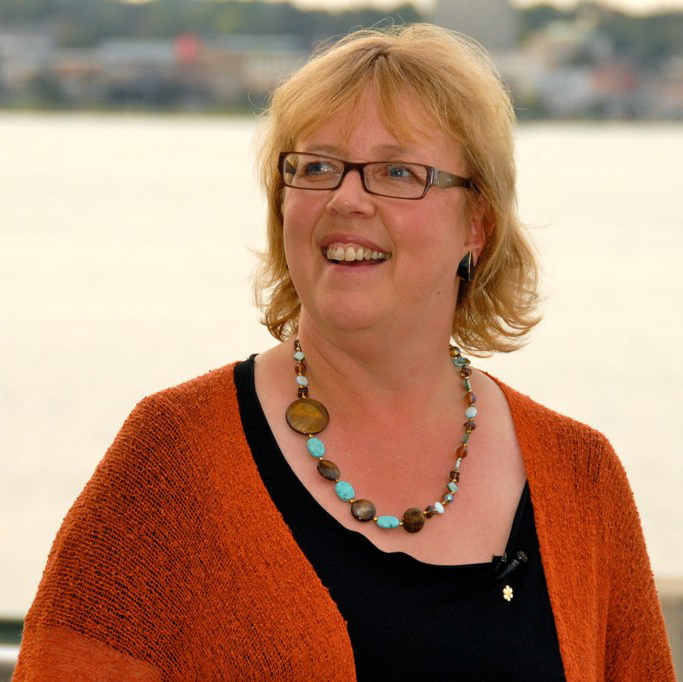
Elizabeth May

After the Conservative government tabled its fiscal update, NDP leader Jack Layton asked his predecessor, Ed Broadbent, to contact former Liberal prime minister Jean Chrétien to discuss a coalition to oust the Conservatives from power. The plan became public almost immediately. Labelling the absence of an economic stimulus plan as irresponsible and the removal of public funding to parties as an attack against democracy, the opposition threatened to topple the government by voting against the fiscal update. The opposition parties based their strategy on the constitutional authority of the Governor General Michaëlle Jean to appoint a Liberal-NDP coalition able to hold the confidence of the House of Commons to form a government, should the Conservative government fall on a matter of confidence.

It was decided that should a coalition between the Liberals and NDP be called upon to form government its mandate would last until June 30, 2011. The proposed coalition was to have a cabinet of 24 ministers of the Crown, with the leader of the Liberal Party as prime minister, 17 other Liberal ministers (including the minister of finance), and six New Democratic ministers; if the prime minister chose a larger cabinet, the NDP proportion would be maintained. As the outgoing leader of the Liberal Party, Dion would have become prime minister, likely serving until the Liberal leadership convention in May 2009. Further, Liberal party elders Frank McKenna, Paul Martin, John Manley, and former Saskatchewan NDP premier Roy Romanow, were reported to have been asked to form an economic advisory body to the coalition if needed, though both McKenna and Manley declined to take part.

The leader of the Bloc Québécois, which held the balance of power in the 40th parliament, signed a policy accord with the other opposition parties and agreed to support the proposed coalition on confidence votes until at least June 30, 2010. In return, the Bloc would have access to a consultative mechanism for the duration of the agreement, but would not directly participate in the coalition, receiving no cabinet positions and being free to vote as it wished on other matters. Independent MP Bill Casey announced he would join in voting non-confidence against Harper. It has been speculated that Layton and Duceppe had formed an agreement prior to the Conservatives' fiscal update and then persuaded Dion to sign on.

In December, Elizabeth May announced the Green Party would support the proposed coalition from outside parliament. Dion indicated that the Green Party would be given input, but not a veto, over coalition policy and left open the possibility, should he become prime minister, of advising the appointment of May to the Senate.

=== Historical background ===
Since Confederation, the only formal coalition government at the federal level was during the First World War, when the governing Conservatives rebranded as the Unionist Party and accepted Liberals from English Canada into government in response to the Conscription Crisis of 1917. After the world wars, Progressive Conservative and Liberal minority governments relied on ad hoc voting arrangements with the NDP and the Social Credit Party to maintain supply instead of formal coalitions. Pierre Trudeau's private offer of a coalition to the NDP after the 1980 election, an attempt to form consensus in the patriation debate and bring more Western Canadian members into Cabinet, was refused by NDP leader Ed Broadbent.

In 2000, the Canadian Alliance and Progressive Conservatives discussed forming a coalition government with the Bloc Québécois if, together, their three parties had won a majority of the seats in the 2000 election. During the minority Martin government of 2004–2006, Conservative leader Stephen Harper sent a letter to Governor General Adrienne Clarkson, suggesting that, if the Liberal minority government fell, the Conservatives would be willing to form a government with the support of the Bloc Québécois and NDP.

There have been examples of coalition governments provincially: In Manitoba, a coalition existed between the provincial Liberal Party and the Progressives following the 1932 election; the two parties subsequently merged, and also led a coalition government with several other parties through the 1940s. British Columbia was governed by a Liberal-Conservative coalition from 1941 to 1952, formed to keep the Co-operative Commonwealth Federation (CCF) from power. In 1985, the Ontario Liberals and the third-place New Democrats reached an agreement to vote non-confidence in the governing Progressive Conservatives and have the lieutenant governor appoint the Liberal leader, David Peterson, as premier, with the NDP pledging to support his government on confidence motions for a period of two years. The NDP had no cabinet posts. The most recent coalition was seen in Saskatchewan in 1999, when the New Democratic Party formed such an arrangement with two Saskatchewan Liberal Party MLAs.

=== Cabinet response ===
On November 28, Stephen Harper referred to the accord between the Liberals and NDP as undemocratic backroom dealing, stating that the opposition parties were "overturning the results of an election a few weeks earlier in order to form a coalition that nobody voted for"; Transport Minister John Baird announced that two of the Minister of Finance's proposals that had been rejected by the opposition—the elimination of political party subsidies and a ban on strikes by public servants—would be dropped. Further, in response to the opposition's demands for an economic stimulus package, the Conservatives changed their plan to one in which a federal budget would be presented on January 27, 2009, instead of late February or early March. Despite these concessions, the Liberals indicated that they intended to present their motion of non-confidence on December 8.

The government then cancelled opposition day, originally to be held on December 1, to avert the threatened vote of non-confidence, this meant the earliest a coalition non-confidence motion could occur would be the following week, December 8, 2008. On November 30, the Conservatives released a secretly recorded private NDP conference call in which Jack Layton indicated that the groundwork for assuring the Bloc's participation "was done a long time ago". The NDP said in reaction that they would consider pressing criminal charges and alleged that Conservative Member of Parliament (MP) John Duncan received the invitation to participate by mistake, in place of NDP MP Linda Duncan, who had "a similar email address". However, it does not constitute a wiretap crime under the Criminal Code of Canada if someone is invited to participate in a conference call and then releases the recording publicly.

The possible change of government was debated during Question Period, and the Conservatives aired radio and television advertisements contending that "a leader whose party captured just 25% of the vote in the October 14 election doesn't have a legitimate mandate to govern". In anticipation of the Prime Minister's visit to the Governor General, Harper's office also organized protests outside of the vicereine's residence, while Baird said that "Conservatives would go over the head of Parliament and of the Governor General". The revenue minister, Jean-Pierre Blackburn, said "It's a kind of coup d'état", while Environment Minister Jim Prentice declared the coalition to be "irresponsible and it is undemocratic". Echoing Prentice's sentiment, Harper insisted that the government "will use all legal means to resist this undemocratic seizure of power".

== Role of the Governor General ==
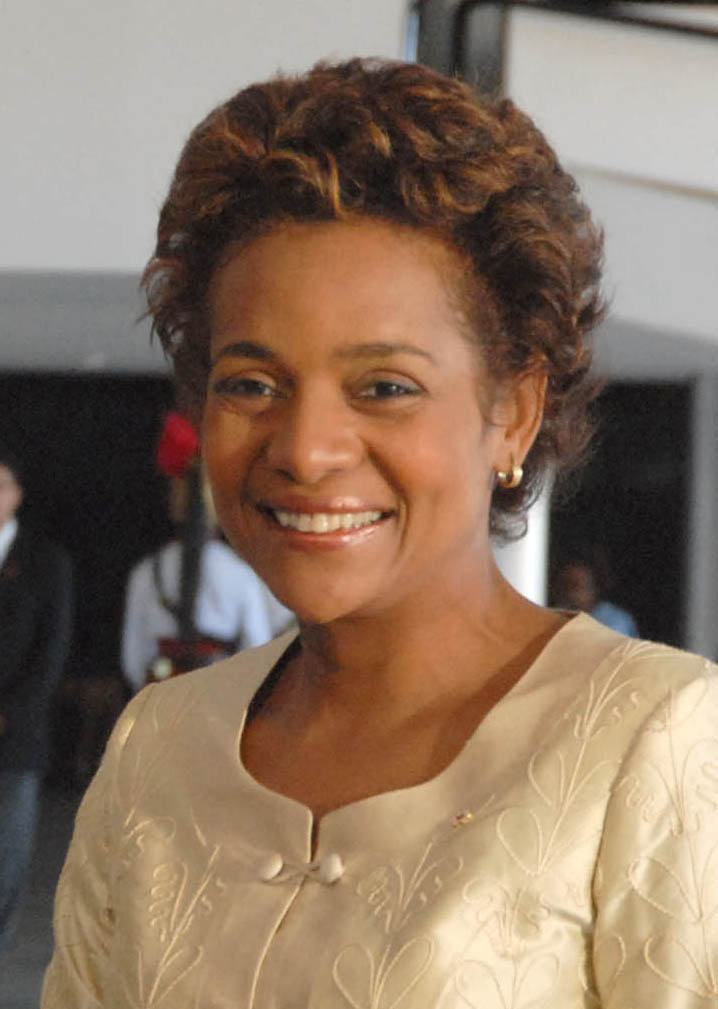
The Governor General of Canada at the time of the dispute, Michaëlle Jean

Governor General Michaëlle Jean stated that "what is happening right now is part of the possibilities in our democratic system and I think that people can be reassured that, as I turn to what is happening, I am myself looking at my constitutional duties." Jean was faced with three possible outcomes as a result of her planned meeting with the Prime Minister on December 4: dissolving parliament, proroguing parliament, or dismiss the Prime Minister and invite the opposition parties to form government.

The media looked to the two previous occasions when the reserve powers of the governor general were used in respect to declining the advice of the prime minister: The first was in 1896, when Charles Tupper refused to resign as prime minister following his party's loss in the election and Governor General the Earl of Aberdeen refused his advice to make several appointments. This effective dismissal forced Tupper to relinquish office. The second was in 1926, during the King–Byng affair, when Prime Minister William Lyon Mackenzie King, already in minority government and having lost two votes that suggested he was likely to lose a third vote—one on a confidence question—asked Governor General the Viscount Byng of Vimy to dissolve parliament. Byng refused on the grounds that parliament was still viable and should sit for a reasonable period before a new election should be called, and then only if members of parliament were demonstrably unable to work together to form an alternate government.

One view held that, in applying the rationale relied upon by Byng to the matters in 2008, Jean would have been obliged to refuse advice to dissolve parliament within less than six months of the previous election, unless Harper had a valid reason consistent with Commonwealth constitutional precedent. However, the situation in 2008 was not identical to the one that unfolded in 1926 and so the precedent may not have been directly applicable: In the 1925 election, Arthur Meighen had emerged as the plurality seat winner and the Liberals had suffered an electoral rebuff, with King losing his own parliamentary riding. Although Byng had suggested he resign immediately, King and his cabinet struggled on with Progressive Party support. In 2008, the Tories were in an electoral ascendancy while the Liberals suffered one of their heaviest defeats. In addition, former Governor-General of New Zealand Sir Michael Hardie Boys expressed the opinion that Byng had been in error in not re-appointing King as prime minister on the defeat of Meighen in the vote of confidence.

=== Dissolution of parliament ===
Peter H. Russell, a professor emeritus of political science at the University of Toronto, suggested that if Harper had sought a dissolution, the Governor General would have had to consider carefully the reasonableness of the request. In Russell's view, the vicereine's primary concern is to protect parliamentary democracy and a dissolution of parliament would have necessitated an election only two months after the preceding one; repeated short term elections are not healthy for the system. In such a case, with a reasonably viable coalition available, Jean might then refuse Harper's advice to dissolve parliament (forcing him to resign under constitutional precedent), and invite Dion to form a government.

Former governor general Adrienne Clarkson wrote in her memoirs, Heart Matters, that she would have allowed the then prime minister, Paul Martin, a dissolution of parliament only after at least six months following the 2004 election: "To put the Canadian people through an election before six months would have been irresponsible", she wrote, especially considering that she had received a letter co-signed by then opposition leader Stephen Harper, NDP leader Jack Layton, and Bloc leader Gilles Duceppe, asking her to consider letting them attempt to form a government without an election if the Liberal government should fall.

Maclean's columnist Andrew Coyne noted that, while a coalition government is neither unconstitutional nor illegitimate, there are several concerns that the Governor General must address in considering installing such a government. The coalition's ability to govern in a stable manner would be a factor. Coyne also noted that the opposition parties' plan was defeating an established government weeks after an election.

=== Prorogation of parliament ===
The option of prorogation (ending the parliamentary session without dissolving parliament in advance of new elections) presented various possible scenarios: One was a long-term prorogation, lasting up to a legal maximum of one year, while another was a short prorogation period lasting a few weeks to a few months. Each would delay parliamentary activity, including the introduction of a motion of non-confidence, and the Conservative government would therefore continue, though without new funding, which requires parliamentary approval. After discussions with the Governor General, Harper advised parliament be prorogued until January 26, 2009, with a budget scheduled to be tabled the following day. On December 3, Dion wrote to the Governor General with his opinion that she must refuse the prime minister's advice to prorogue parliament; in his opinion, it would be an abuse of power to deny or delay the right of the legislature to give or withhold confidence in the government. He also suggested that the government had already, in effect, lost the confidence of the House of Commons and that Harper was therefore incompetent to tender official advice as prime minister.

Constitutional scholar C. E. S. Franks of Queen's University suggested that the Governor General could have agreed to prorogue parliament, though on the condition that the government only manage day-to-day affairs until parliament was reconvened; the Governor General would not approve orders-in-council requiring Cabinet decisions, meaning that the government could not undertake any major policy initiatives, much like the way governments govern during an election campaign. However, a prime minister advising prorogation when facing an imminent confidence vote, as well a governor general refusing or implementing conditions on such a request, would all be unprecedented in Canadian history; "there is no precedent whatsoever in Canada and probably in the Commonwealth", Franks stated. Constitutional scholar and former advisor to governors general Ted McWhinney said that the Governor General would have no choice but to accept the Prime Minister's advice concerning prorogation, though the Prime Minister would have to defend to the electorate why he had advised this particular course.

Former governor general and NDP politician Edward Schreyer stated that if the Conservative government were to lose a vote of confidence, Michaëlle Jean would have no choice but to offer the coalition the opportunity to govern. He also said that prorogation would be a difficult judgement call and said that a short prorogation might be reasonable as long as it was not "used in the longer term as a means of evading, avoiding and thwarting the expression of the parliamentary will" by avoiding a confidence vote.

In 1873, during the 2nd Canadian parliament, Prime Minister Sir John A. Macdonald advised Governor General the Earl of Dufferin to prorogue parliament to stop the work of a committee investigating Macdonald's involvement in the Pacific Scandal. While the Governor General did reluctantly grant prorogation, he insisted that it be limited to a period of ten weeks. When parliament returned, Macdonald was censured and had to resign.

== Leadup to the Governor General's decision ==
=== Leaders' addresses to the nation on December 3 ===
Both Harper and Dion addressed the nation on December 3, 2008, with televised statements broadcast on Canada's major television networks. Harper's five-minute pre-recorded statement, televised nationally in English and French at 7 pm Eastern Time (ET), outlined the steps the government had taken to address the 2008 financial crisis and attacked the Liberals for forming a coalition with the Bloc Québécois. Harper said: "at a time of global economic instability, Canada's government must stand unequivocally for keeping the country together. At a time like this, a coalition with the separatists cannot help Canada. And the opposition does not have the democratic right to impose a coalition with the separatists they promised voters would never happen." The press noted that while he used the word sovereigntist in the French version of his speech, Harper used separatist in English.

The networks also agreed to air a response from Dion, which aired around 7:30 pm ET. In it, Dion attacked the Conservatives, stating they did not have a plan to weather the 2008 financial crisis and he claimed that Canadians did not want another election, instead preferring that parliament work together during this time. "Within one week, a new direction will be established, a tone and focus will be set. We will gather with leaders of industry and labour to work, unlike the Conservatives, in a collaborative, but urgent manner to protect jobs." This statement, intended to air immediately following Harper's, was late in arriving to the networks and was of low video quality, prompting the party to apologize; CBC Television network anchorman Peter Mansbridge compared the quality of Dion's video to YouTube. CTV Television Network had already signed off its special broadcast before Dion's statement arrived. CTV commentator Robert Fife stated that the New Democrats and Bloc Québécois were "angry" with the quality of Dion's address.

Layton unsuccessfully requested his own airtime and later addressed Canadians live on the national news channels where he said: "tonight, only one party stands in the way of a government that actually works for Canadians ... Instead of acting on these ideas ... Mr. Harper delivered a partisan attack." Duceppe said: "Stephen Harper showed a serious and worrisome lack of judgment by putting his party's ideology before the economy."

=== Immediate reaction ===
In the nine predominantly English-speaking provinces, polls showed the idea of a coalition was unpopular. Strongest support for the coalition came from the Atlantic Provinces and Quebec, while the strongest opposition was in Alberta. It was speculated that had the coalition taken power from the Conservatives, it would revive concerns of western alienation that had been tempered by the Conservative victory two years prior. Anti-coalition rally organizers emphasized that their opposition was to the Bloc's association with the coalition, not Quebecers in general.

Conservative attacks on the coalition would cost the party future support in Quebec, as Quebecers "tend to view sovereignist parties as legitimate political formations"; Antonia Maioni, head of the Institute for the Study of Canada at McGill University, stated that "[Harper] is portraying not only the Bloc Québécois but Quebecers in general as being a threat to national unity in Canada." Dion defended the coalition accord, saying that "fellow Quebecers who believe in separation are more likely to be reconciled with Canada if we work with them than if we marginalize them".

=== Other reactions ===
Statements regarding the upset in Ottawa came from provincial premiers, both past and present: Danny Williams, Premier of Newfoundland and Labrador, who originally started the ABC campaign, stated that he would remain neutral on this issue and that he would work with whoever was prime minister; British Columbia Premier Gordon Campbell spoke out against the coalition, stating that if their gamble fails, Canada's economic worries will become significantly worse as a result; Alberta Premier Ed Stelmach urged federal party leaders to take a time out and hold off the non-confidence vote until the new year so a federal budget can be introduced.

Quebec Premier Jean Charest, a federalist and former leader of the federal Progressive Conservative Party, condemned the "anti-sovereigntist rhetoric" of the prime minister, emphasizing that the Bloc MPs had been legitimately elected by Quebecers, and stating: "I live in a society in which people can be sovereigntists or federalists, but they respect each other. The same thing should prevail in the federal parliament." He also accused Parti Québécois leader Pauline Marois of using the ensuing discussion about the coalition to attempt to build sovereigntist momentum. Former Quebec premier Jacques Parizeau told Le Journal de Montréal that the deal was an "impressive victory", showing how powerful the Bloc Québécois is in federal politics.

Political satirist and commentator Rick Mercer wrote, "The drama that played out this week was many things: unimaginable, embarrassing and, yes, it made our parliamentary system look like a laughingstock. However, this situation was not, as Mr. Harper insisted, undemocratic, illegal or un-Canadian." The editorial board of The Globe and Mail echoed Mercer's sentiment, pointing out that Harper's statements on the legality of the coalition were "knowingly erroneous" and, in June 2012, Peter H. Russell said the Conservative's attacks on the legitimacy of the coalition proposal were "deliberately misleading" and that the notion that "a multiparty government must be approved by voters beforehand is 'absolutely B.S.'"

== Governor General prorogues parliament ==
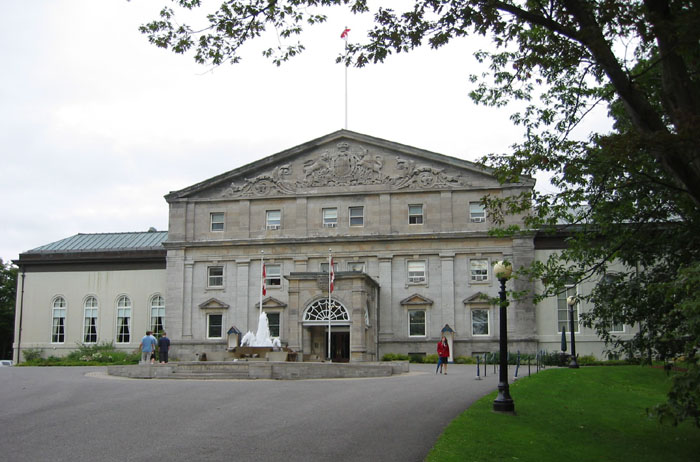
Rideau Hall, the official residence of the Governor General of Canada, where Prime Minister Stephen Harper met with the Queen's representative, Michaëlle Jean, on December 4, 2008

On December 2, it was announced that Harper's plan was to ask the Governor General to prorogue parliament, delaying a confidence vote until the new year. The coalition leadership sent a letter to Jean—who was abroad conducting state visits to various European countries—informing her of the events, upon the receipt of which, Jean announced that she would cut her trip short and return to Ottawa "in light of the current political situation in Canada". Harper visited the Governor General at Rideau Hall at about 9:30 am EST on December 4. After consulting with the Prime Minister and other advisors for more than two hours, Jean granted Harper's request and parliament was prorogued until January 26, 2009, with the Conservatives scheduled to announce the budget the following day. Near the end of her tenure as vicereine, Jean revealed to the Canadian Press that the two-hour delay in giving her decision was partly to "send a message—and for people to understand that this warranted reflection." She later stated in an interview on The Hour that "I was in a position where I could have said no ... And the decision had really to, in my mind, to be in the best interests, really, of the country, looking at all of the circumstances. And I have no regrets."

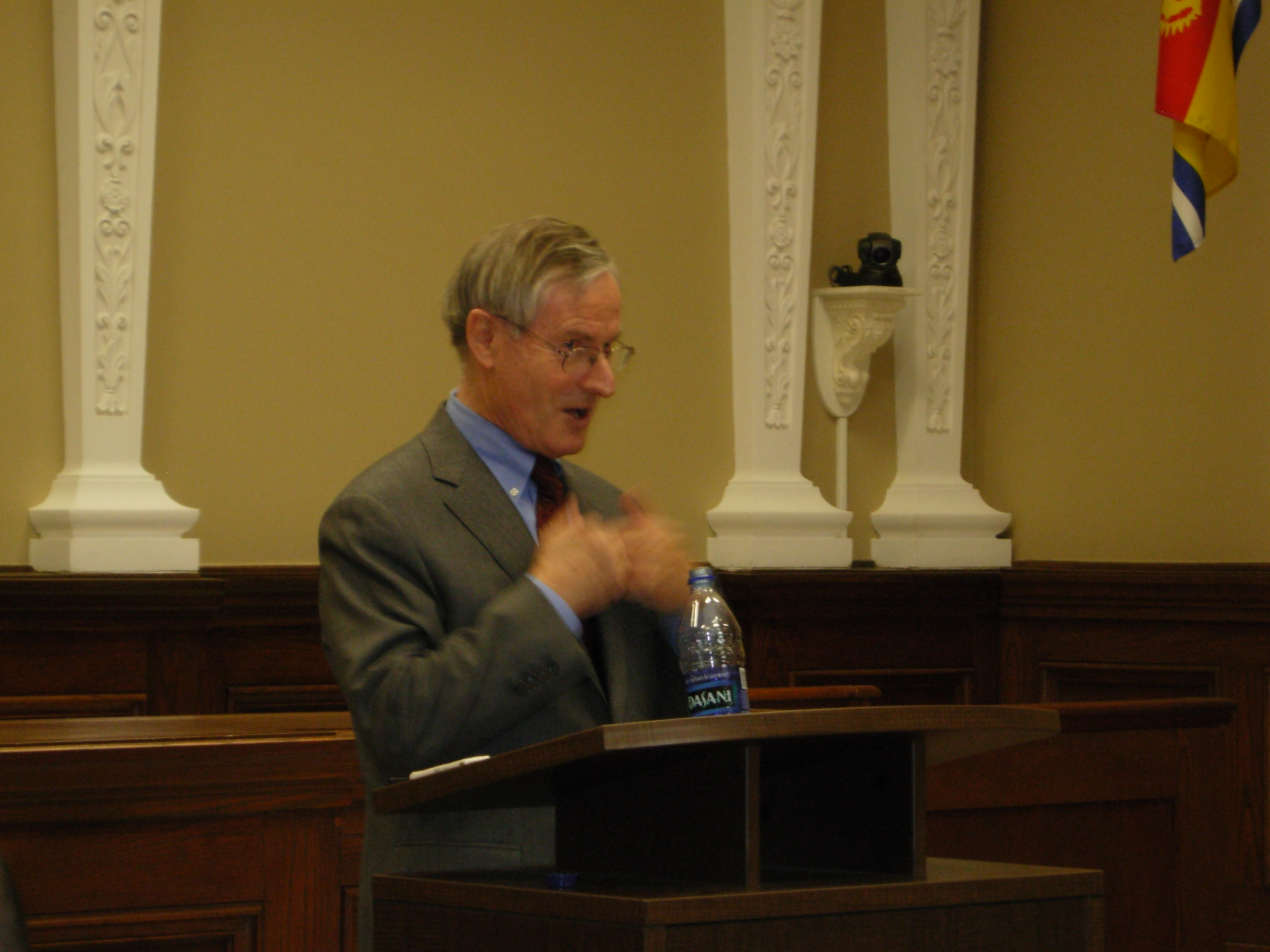
Peter Hogg, a constitutional expert from whom Governor General Michaëlle Jean sought advice

It was also at the same time said by Peter H. Russell, one of the constitutional experts from whom Jean sought advice, that Canadians ought not regard the Governor General's decision to grant Harper's request as an automatic rubber stamp; Russell disclosed that Jean granted the prorogation on two conditions: parliament would reconvene soon and, when it did, the Cabinet would present to parliament a proposed budget, a vote on which is automatically a matter of confidence. This, Russell said, set a precedent that would prevent future prime ministers from advising the prorogation of parliament "for any length of time for any reason". He in 2012 also speculated that, though it was likely not "an overriding factor", Jean may have been concerned that, should she have refused Harper's advice, the vote of non-confidence proceeded and succeeded, and a new coalition cabinet was installed, the Conservative Party would launch a public campaign painting the new government and, by extension, the actions of the Governor General as illegitimate, creating "a crisis of confidence in Canada's political system". Peter Hogg disagreed with Russell's supposition.

Most scholars indicated that the privacy of the meeting between Harper and Jean follows "the tradition of regal discretion [going] back centuries, to the era when Britain's Parliament was only a minor branch of government"; the practice protects the viceroy's necessary non-partisan nature. Lorne Sossin, professor at the University of Toronto and a constitutional law expert, offered a counter-opinion, stating that "it is simply not acceptable to have a closed door at Rideau Hall at moments like this", citing that transparency is a necessity in democracy. Joe Comartin, NDP MP for Windsor-Tecumseh, suggested that such decisions should be made by the Chief Justice of Canada after a hearing in open court.

Andrew Dreschel of The Hamilton Spectator stated proroguing parliament was the right move, imposing a "cooling-off period on the sweaty rhetoric and dank distortions that have been steaming up the political spectrum". Conservative MP Bruce Stanton said the suspension of parliament until late January "was perhaps the last tool in our basket to be able to allow parliamentarians to take a step back". Before Russell revealed the conditions Jean placed on her acceptance of Harper's advice, there was some concern that Jean's decision may have set a precedent for a prime minister to seek prorogation or dissolution when confronting a potential vote of non-confidence. Nelson Wiseman, a professor of political science at the University of Toronto, said the following of Harper's advice "has been a blow to parliamentary democracy in Canada" and Helen Forsey, daughter of Eugene Forsey, claimed that Jean's granting of prorogation was a shameful encouragement of "flagrantly subversive behaviour by a Prime Minister" and that, had he still been alive, the senior Forsey's "denunciations would have been ringing from the rooftops". Margaret Wente at The Globe and Mail opined that the Governor General was the only person who emerged from the situation with any gained respect.

In his book Harperland, published in late 2010, columnist Lawrence Martin quoted Kory Teneycke, former director of communication for the Office of the Prime Minister, as saying that, in the days preceding Harper's meeting with the Governor General, the option of appealing to the Queen was considered, should Jean decline prorogation. Such a series of events would have been a first in Canadian history. Constitutional scholar Ned Franks said to The Globe and Mail in September 2010 that the Queen would likely have refused to intervene in such circumstances. Four years later, Dr. D. Michael Jackson, former Chief of Protocol of Saskatchewan, observed that the whole affair quelled any suspicion of the utility of the Crown; it "portrayed the Governor General as an impartial umpire."

=== Aftermath and resolution ===
On December 4, 2008, after the prorogation, Dion hinted that the Liberals could support the Conservative budget, but only if it represented a "monumental change". Layton and Duceppe remained committed to their proposed coalition and toppling the Harper government, with Layton demanding that the Conservatives provide affordable housing and childcare programs alongside subsidies for struggling industries. Liberal MP Jim Karygiannis said that the coalition would not survive when parliament resumed, while others in his party suggested working with the Conservatives on the economy.

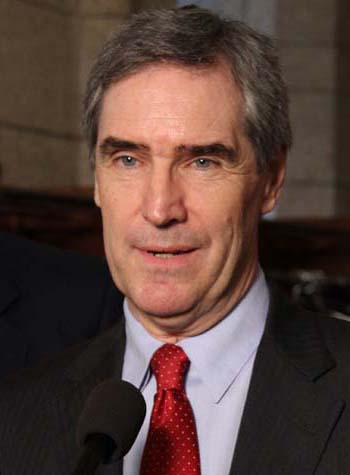
Michael Ignatieff

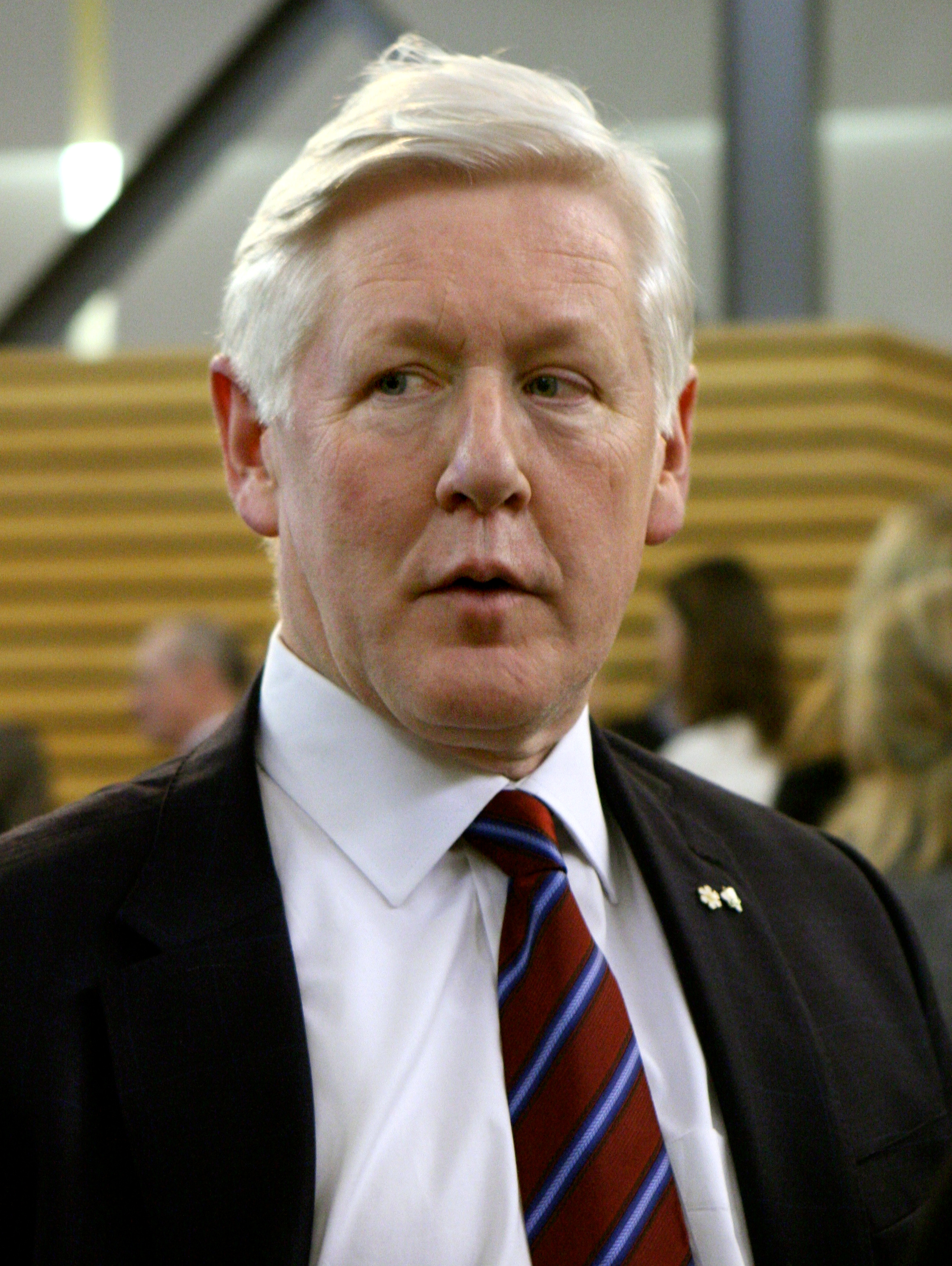
Bob Rae

After the Governor General prorogued parliament, there were questions within the Liberal Party regarding the future of Dion's leadership and the coalition. In a caucus meeting held the same day of the prorogation, Dion faced criticism for the amateur, out-of-focus video of his address to the nation and for disallowing dissent once the coalition accord was presented to caucus. Former deputy prime minister John Manley, in an op-ed in The Globe and Mail, demanded that Dion resign immediately as Liberal leader. Leadership contenders Michael Ignatieff and Bob Rae both agreed that Dion had to quit immediately. Dion announced on December 8, 2008, that he would step down upon the selection of an interim leader.

Bob Rae, who helped to persuade the Liberal caucus of the power-sharing deal, took over as the coalition's main Liberal advocate and planned to travel throughout the country to promote the coalition. Michael Ignatieff, the frontrunner to succeed Dion, stated that he believed the proposal had kept the Conservatives in check, and described his position as a "coalition if necessary, but not necessarily a coalition" after viewing the Conservative budget. After the withdrawal of his two rivals, Ignatieff was left as the sole declared leadership candidate, so he was appointed interim leader, and was chosen as leader at the May 2009 convention.

On December 12, Ignatieff met with Harper to discuss the budget, with their spokesmen describing the meeting as a "cordial". Layton and Duceppe remained committed to ousting the Harper government, pledging that the NDP would vote against the Conservative budget regardless of what it contained. Layton urged Ignatieff's Liberals to topple the Conservatives before the shelf life of the coalition expired; constitutional experts said that four months after the last election, if the government fell, the Governor General would likely grant the Prime Minister's request to dissolve parliament instead of inviting the coalition to form the government.

On January 28, 2009, the Liberals agreed to support the budget as long as it included regular accountability reports, and the Conservatives accepted this amendment. This ended the possibility of the coalition, with Layton publicly denouncing Ignatieff's decision.

== Public response ==
=== Polling ===
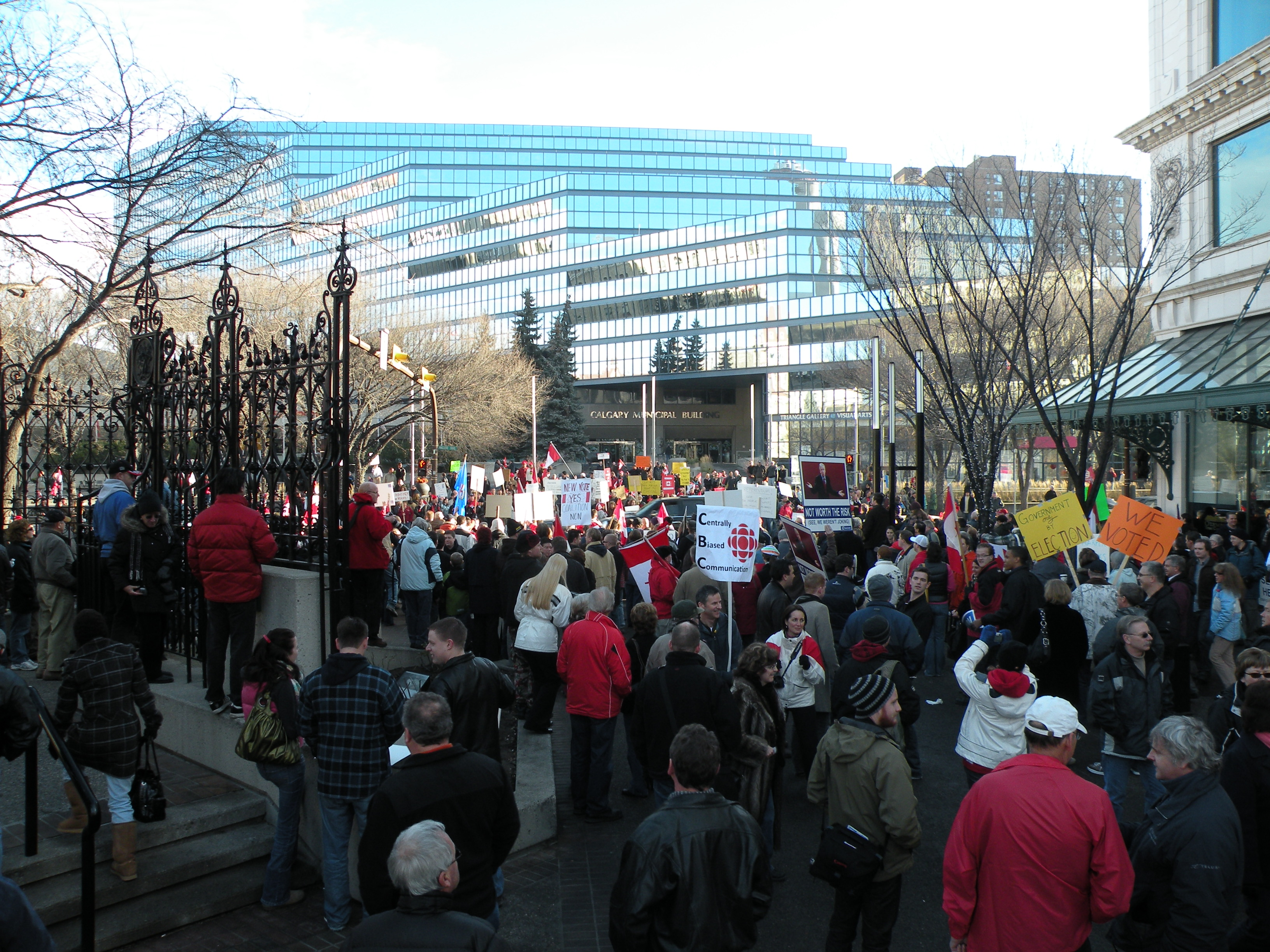
This anti-coalition rally in Calgary was one of several demonstrations held across Canada both in support of and opposition to the coalition's attempts at gaining control of parliament

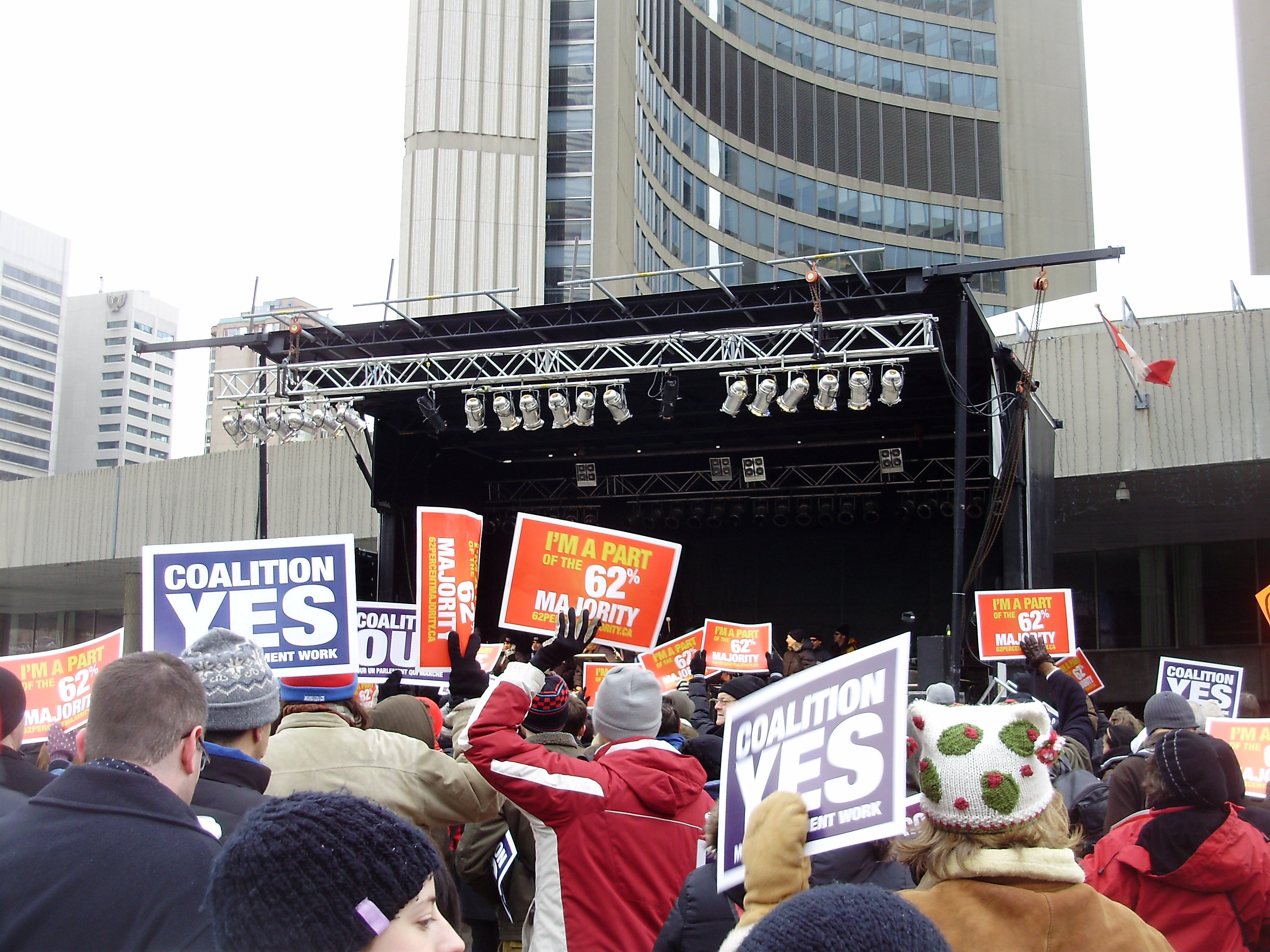
The pro-coalition rally in Toronto was held in Nathan Phillips Square, at the foot of Toronto City Hall, and featured Stéphane Dion and Jack Layton as speakers

An Angus Reid Strategies poll on this subject conducted on December 1 and 2, 2008, consisting of online interviews with 1,012 Canadian adults, and with a reported margin of error of 3.1%, showed that 40% of respondents agreed with the statement "The Conservative party does not deserve to continue in government", while 35% agreed with "The Conservative party deserves to continue in government", and 25% were "not sure". On the question "Should the opposition parties get together and topple the Conservative minority government headed by Stephen Harper?", 41% responded No, 36% Yes, and 23% not sure. If the government was defeated in a no-confidence vote, 37% of respondents would support a coalition of opposition parties taking power, 32% favoured holding a new election, 7% favoured an accord rather than a coalition among opposition parties, and 24% were not sure.

A Léger Marketing poll of 2,226 people, conducted on behalf of Sun Media and released on December 4, showed a regional split on what should happen if the Harper government fell. Nationally, 43% of respondents preferred a new election be held, compared to 40% who favoured allowing the coalition to govern. In Western Canada, however, respondents were sharply opposed to the coalition, led by Albertans, who responded 71% in favour of new elections. Quebec showed the highest level of support for the coalition, with 58% preferring it to a new election. Ontario was split, with 43% preferring an election compared to 39% supporting the coalition. This poll also showed that 60% of Canadians were concerned that the Bloc Québécois would hold the balance of power in a coalition, compared to 35% that were not concerned, with the majority of respondents in every region, excluding Quebec, expressing concern. 34% of those polled argued that the Conservatives were best able to handle the 2008 financial crisis, compared to 18% for the coalition. 14% felt the Liberals individually were best prepared, 7% felt the NDP individually were the best choice, and 2% felt the Bloc Québécois were best.

An EKOS Research Associates poll of 2,536 people, conducted on behalf of CBC and released on December 4, showed that if an election were held the next day, the Conservatives would have received 44% of the vote, up from 37.6%; the Liberals 24%, down from 26%; the New Democrats 14.5%, down from 18.2%; the Bloc 9%, down from 10.5%; and the Green Party 8%, up from 4.5%. 37% of respondents (including the majority of Conservative voters) expressed support in proroguing parliament, while 28% (including a majority of Liberal and Bloc voters, and a near majority of NDP voters) supported the proposed coalition taking power within the next few weeks, with 19% supporting an election. Additionally, 47% of respondents thought that Harper's Conservative government would better manage the 2008 financial crisis, versus 34% in support of the Dion-led coalition. Furthermore, 48% of respondents (including the majority of Liberal, NDP, and Green voters, but only 41% of Conservative voters) expressed confidence in the Governor General's ability to make decisions regarding the impasse.

An Ipsos-Reid poll suggested that if an election had been held on December 5, the Conservatives would have received 46% of the vote, enough to have easily formed a majority government. The poll also showed Liberal support had dropped to 23% from the 26.2% they received in the election, and New Democrat support fell to 13% from 18.2%. Also telling was that 56% of those polled said they would rather go to another election, rather than let the coalition govern.

But opposition to the coalition waned after Christmas, 2008. In a poll taken from January 3 to 7 Nanos Research found 33% would vote Conservative, 34% Liberal, 19% NDP.

By January 12 to 14, 2009, The Strategic Counsel found the parties were back to more or less 2006 levels: CPC 36%, Liberals 29%, NDP 18% and it also shows the public now almost evenly split in terms of their attitude towards the coalition. It appeared that the short term bump the Tories got after they prorogued had vanished. The coalition had 44% support, another election 49%, yet only 36% would vote Conservative.

On January 15–17 EKOS Research Associates found 50% support for the coalition, while 43% would prefer the Conservative government to the coalition, and 6% were undecided, although only 36% would vote Conservative. Yet 49% wanted a new election, showing some confusion remained.

=== Rallies ===
Public rallies, both in favour of and against the coalition, continued to be held a number of days after the prorogation, particularly on the afternoon of December 6. Besides the aforementioned that was attended by both Dion and Layton, other gatherings included one in Halifax, with Conservative MP Gerald Keddy attending; one in Calgary, at which Conservative MP Jason Kenney addressed the crowd; and at Queen's Park in Toronto, where Conservative MP Peter Kent spoke alongside John Tory, leader of the Progressive Conservative Party of Ontario. The rallies, all together, attracted over ten thousand, with the largest assembly being in Ottawa, with an estimated attendance of 4,000. Calgary had an estimated 2,500 and Toronto an estimated 1,500.

=== Online activity ===
Web users across the political spectrum came out in force, leaving thousands of posts on news websites, blogs, and news articles; on December 1, The Globe and Mail website had over 4,500 comments posted on its articles related to the political dispute. This motion was in addition to the multiple specialized websites that were launched during the upset, and using the Internet to promote rallies and protests in the hopes of voicing their opinion.

== See also ==
- Government of Canada
- Legislative session § Procedure in Commonwealth realms
- Monarchy of Canada
- 2011 Canadian federal election
