= Hilltown =

Hilltown may refer to:

- Hill town, a town built upon hills to make invasion difficult
- Hilltown, Nova Scotia, Canada
- Hilltown, County Down, Northern Ireland
- Hilltown, County Westmeath, St. Feighin's, barony of Fore, County Westmeath, Ireland
- Hilltown, Dundee, Scotland
- Hilltown, South Australia

== United States ==
- Hilltown, the former name of Helltown, California
- Hilltown, Indiana
- Hilltown Township, Bucks County, Pennsylvania
  - Hilltown, Pennsylvania
- Hilltown, Virginia

== See also ==
- List of hilltowns in Central Italy
- Hiltown, Lower Saxony, Germany
- Hilltowns, of Western Massachusetts, United States
- Hill Town, the former name of Old Hilltown, California
- Hill Township (disambiguation)
- Town Hill (disambiguation)
- Townhill (disambiguation)
