= Hilltowns in Italy =

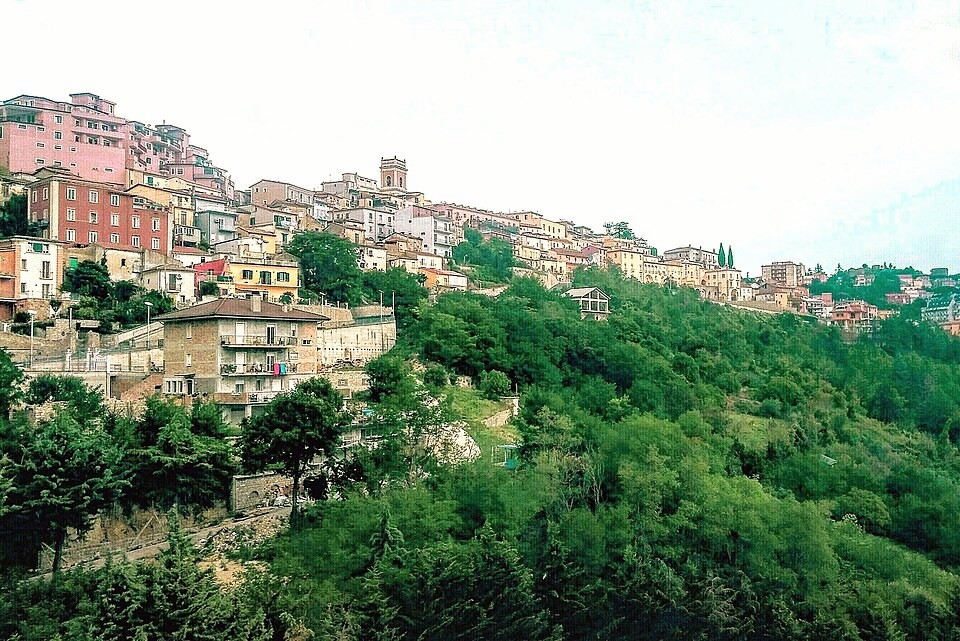
Ariano Irpino, a hilltown lying astride Apennines at 2,585 feet (788 m) elevation.

Italian hilltop settlements were built upon hills for defensive purposes, surrounded by thick defensive walls, steep embankments, or cliffs which provided natural defenses for their earliest inhabitants. In the Middle Ages, earthworks and stone and wooden palisades were typically replaced with massive stone and masonry walls, sturdy gates, and watch towers. In the late Middle Ages and Renaissance, even some of the smallest and most remote hill towns were adorned with churches housing works of art and impressive noble residences.

Italy's hill towns have been studied for the communities that inhabited them, as repositories of Medieval and Renaissance art, and for their architecture. The construction techniques used to build these hill towns have even been studied by seismologists to understand why their ancient masonry and stone structures often survive earthquakes that destroy nearby modern buildings.

In the second half of the 20th century, many of Italy's lesser-known hill towns, especially those located outside Tuscany and Umbria, experienced steep population declines as their residents left for urban centres. In recent years, this trend has reversed with a deepening appreciation of Italian hill towns and interest in their preservation.

== See also ==
- List of hilltowns in Northern Italy
- List of hilltowns in Central Italy
- List of hilltowns in Southern Italy
- Hill people

== Sources ==
- Elloway, Irene G. (1977). Hill towns of Tuscany and Umbria: a study of their siting, growth and present-day adaptation (PhD thesis). London: Birkbeck College.
