= Town Hill =

Town Hill may refer to:

- Town Hill (Maryland−Pennsylvania), a mountain range in the U.S. states of Maryland and Pennsylvania
- Town Hill, Bermuda, the highest point on the island of Bermuda
- Town Hill (Massachusetts), a mountain in Barnstable County, Massachusetts, U.S.
- Town Hill District, a historic district in Boston, Massachusetts, U.S.
- Town Hill, Wrexham, a street in Wrexham, North Wales

== See also ==
- Townhill (disambiguation)
- Hill town, a town built upon hills
- Hilltown (disambiguation)
