= Castrovalva =

Castrovalva may refer to:

- Castrovalva (Abruzzi), a village in the Province of L'Aquila in the Abruzzo region of Italy
- Castrovalva (M. C. Escher), a lithograph print by the Dutch artist M. C. Escher depicting the village
- Castrovalva (Doctor Who), a serial in the British science fiction television series Doctor Who
- Castrovalva (band), a rock band from Leeds, England
- Castrovalva, a fantasy world in the Kingdom of the Wicked comic book series
