= Hill town =

Town built upon a hill

The ruins of Machu Picchu built at the height of Incan civilization but abandoned just 100 years later

A hill town (also hilltop town) is a type of a settlement built upon hills. Often protected by defensive walls, steep embankments, or cliffs, such hilltop settlements provided natural defenses for their inhabitants. The term "hill town" is occasionally a bit of misnomer, as some of these settlements are built on "pedestals" other than hills in the strict geographical sense.

In Europe, especially in Italy, Spain, Portugal and southern France, such towns were common. In Italy, hill towns comprised about half of the important towns in the Middle Ages. In many cases the Roman and medieval sites are now abandoned due to their remote locations, for example in the south of England. In parts of Italy (Tuscany and Umbria), however, most of the ancient hill towns are still populated, some becoming cities, like Siena.

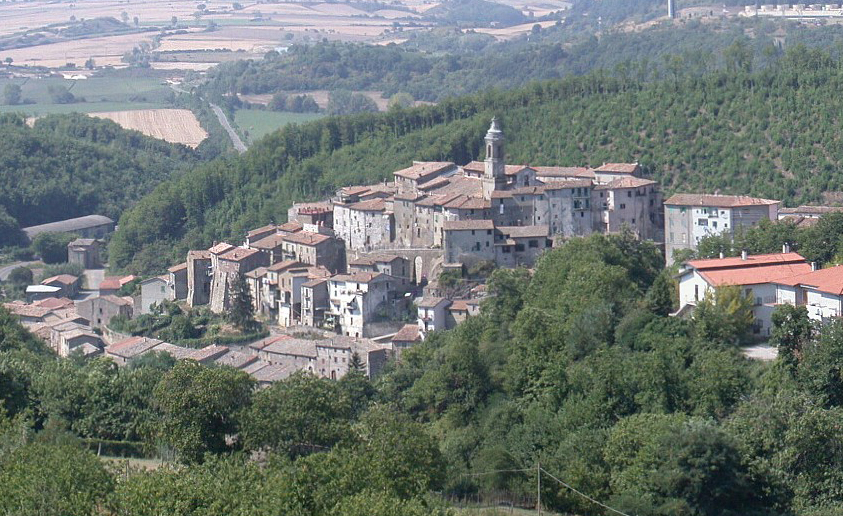
Latera, an "archetypal" Italian hill town

The Spanish even brought the traditional European hill town to the Americas, a notable example being the 16th century Mexican hill town of Guanajuato. However, fortified hill towns were by no means solely a European creation. For instance, Incan fortified hill towns predated the arrival of the Spanish by many centuries and rival those of Europe, including Machu Picchu, an Incan hill town completed in the mid-15th century in Peru, now in ruins. Construction of fortified hill towns was common in many civilizations. Ancient examples can also be found in Africa and Asia.

Despite the challenges of building settlements on uneven ground, cities in complex topographic settings are "routinely" considered to be among most distinctive ones, pleasing to the eye when observed from within or enjoyed as a part of the landscape.

== Urban design ==
Since the beginning of human civilization, most city planners highly valued availability of level land. Sumerian city-states and Roman cities were located on the plains, with defensive fortifications engineered. The challenging town sites, like hills, were frequently places of refuge (in Italy, the explosive growth of hill towns in medieval times was a result of loss of stability after the fall of the Roman Empire). Sometimes the choice to build a city on a hilltop (or hillside) is driven by a location of desirable harbor amidst a rugged coastline, a religious site (elevated locations are "common preference" for the places of worship), or a hard-to-access work site (like a marble quarry). Elevated locations also provide relief from mosquito-borne deceases like malaria. Some towns started as a castle and evolved into a stopover point during military marches. Raymond E. Crist also suggested yet another possible cause of placing a town on the piece of land least suitable for construction − a latifundium: with all the lower-elevation flat land claimed for agricultural production, it is natural to put the workers' quarters onto the surrounding hills.

In the 1960s, Kevin A. Lynch had observed that the hill towns usually have a quite identifiable edge and is small enough to warrant a single administrative unit ("district"). He suggested that the buildings not intended to dominate the view to be placed on the brow of the hill, that so their roofs are visible with the top of the hill in the background and do not define the skyline. Placing of tall building onto the hilltop adds to the distinctiveness of the town. Lynch proposed that, while a gentle slope the building lines can follow the horizontal contours, on a steep slope the building line should "plunge" across the contour one. Christian Norberg-Schulz noted in 1970s that while the row of buildings is a natural layout for the flat terrain, the use of promontory suggests a cluster-like arrangement of houses.

As the urban sprawl exhausts the available level grounds, major cities worldwide become hillier (San Diego, São Paulo, Madrid, Nairobi, Nagasaki, Perth).

== Mediterranean ==
Mediterranean hill towns greatly vary in appearance, but have an "undeniable kinship" among their urban environments. Architects studied their commonalities since the early 1800s (Karl Friedrich Schinkel), but intensive research started with the formation of Team 10 in 1953 and creation of the International Laboratory of Architecture and Urban Design (ILAUD) in 1976.

=== Italy ===
The hill towns in Tuscany and Umbria retained many medieval buildings, a testament both to their former wealth necessary for the use of lasting materials as well to a rapid impoverishment later that prevented the demolition of old structures. While decidedly medieval on the surface, these hill towns usually have deeper roots dating back to Etruscans and frequently to the Bronze Age cultures. The hilltop towns were the typical type of settlement in pre-Roman Italy. During the Roman conquest these towns were demolished, their population driven to the plains. With the fall of Roman Empire, the towns were rebuilt again as places of refuge, usually around castles dating back to the early Middle Ages. This was aided by the general deterioration of agriculture seeing the return from the regular crop rotation back to the shifting cultivation and nomadic herding that did not need permanent small hamlets in the plains that were prevalent during the Roman colonization. At the same time, the marshes appear in the valleys with the corresponding spread of malaria. These factors renewed the need for centralized well-defended settlements in elevated locations. As the centuries passed, the need for physical security decreased, but the hill towns carried on due to the "law of inertia", now surrounded by smaller settlements on the adjacent plains, partially due to the mezzadria sharecropping system, where the landlords lived in nearby towns. The towns also housed the poorest group of population, landless laborers (braccianti).

Alternation between the periods of destruction was typical for Tuscan hill towns. Intercity conflicts were common during the Middle Ages and Renaissance. At the same time, control over nearby roads and waterways allowed the towns to extract toll from travelling merchants. The cities lucky to be close to Via Francigena, like Siena, were also able to obtain money by providing services to pilgrims.

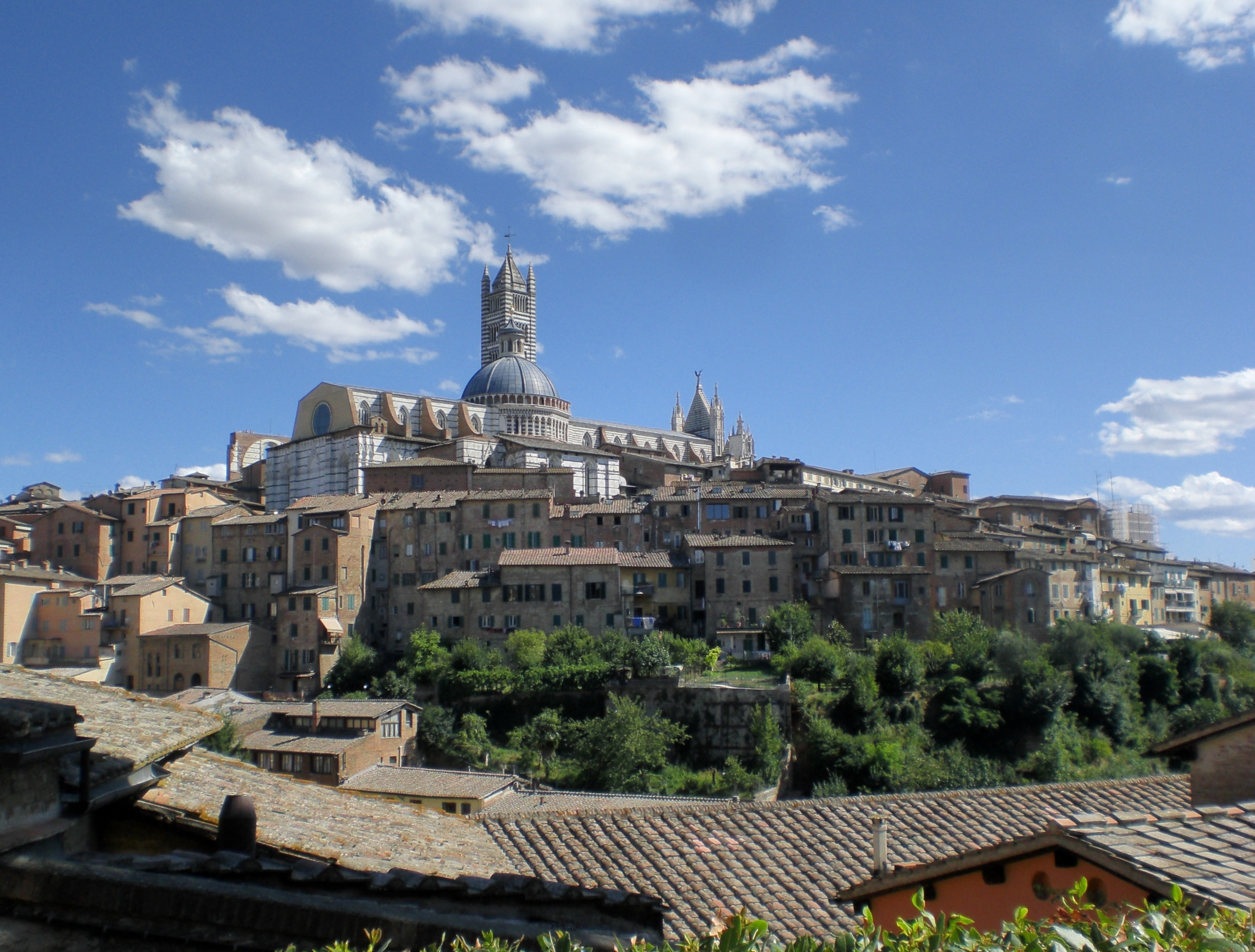
Siena cathedral

=== Greece ===
The typical ancient Greek town started as fortified poleis on the hill top, frequently replacing a castle of Mycenean ruler. With security gradually improving, the cities spilled down to the slopes and plains below.

=== France ===
Hill towns can be found throughout France, E. M. Fryer subdivided them into four types:

- a large town with its massive walls with grand towers and turrets, and a citadel (like Poitiers);
- a supply town huddling up to a feudal residence on a hilltop (Chauvigny);
- a fortified town with no castle, communally protected, in addition to the walls, through reinforced houses and churches (Uzerche);
- a monastic town with its primary defenses around the shrine (Mont-Saint-Michel, Le Puy-en-Velay, Rocamadour).
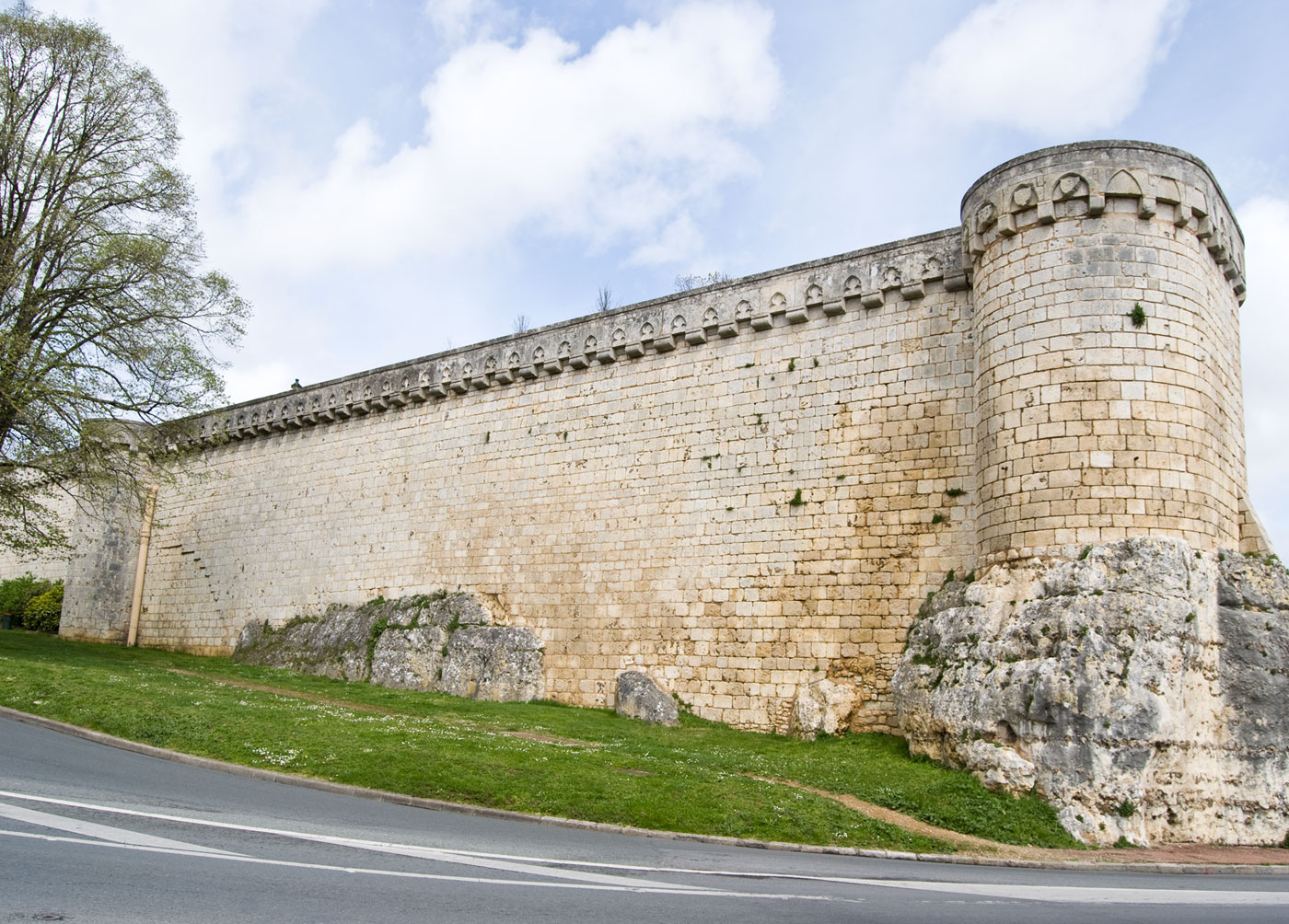
Poitiers city walls

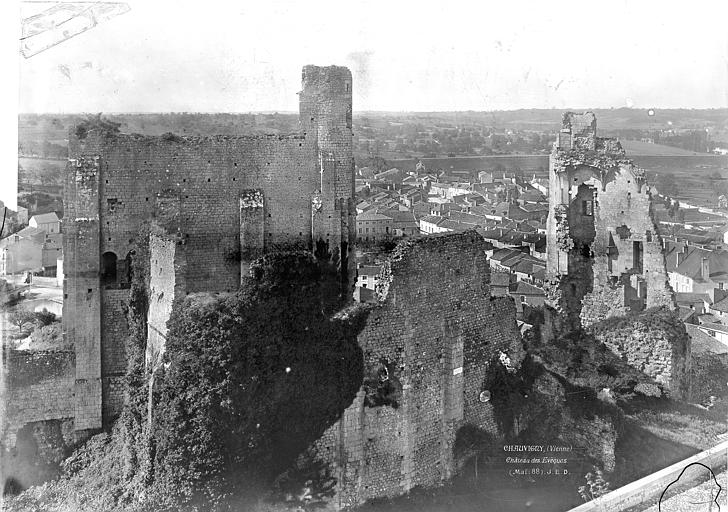
Château des Evêques de Poitiers overlooks Chauvigny

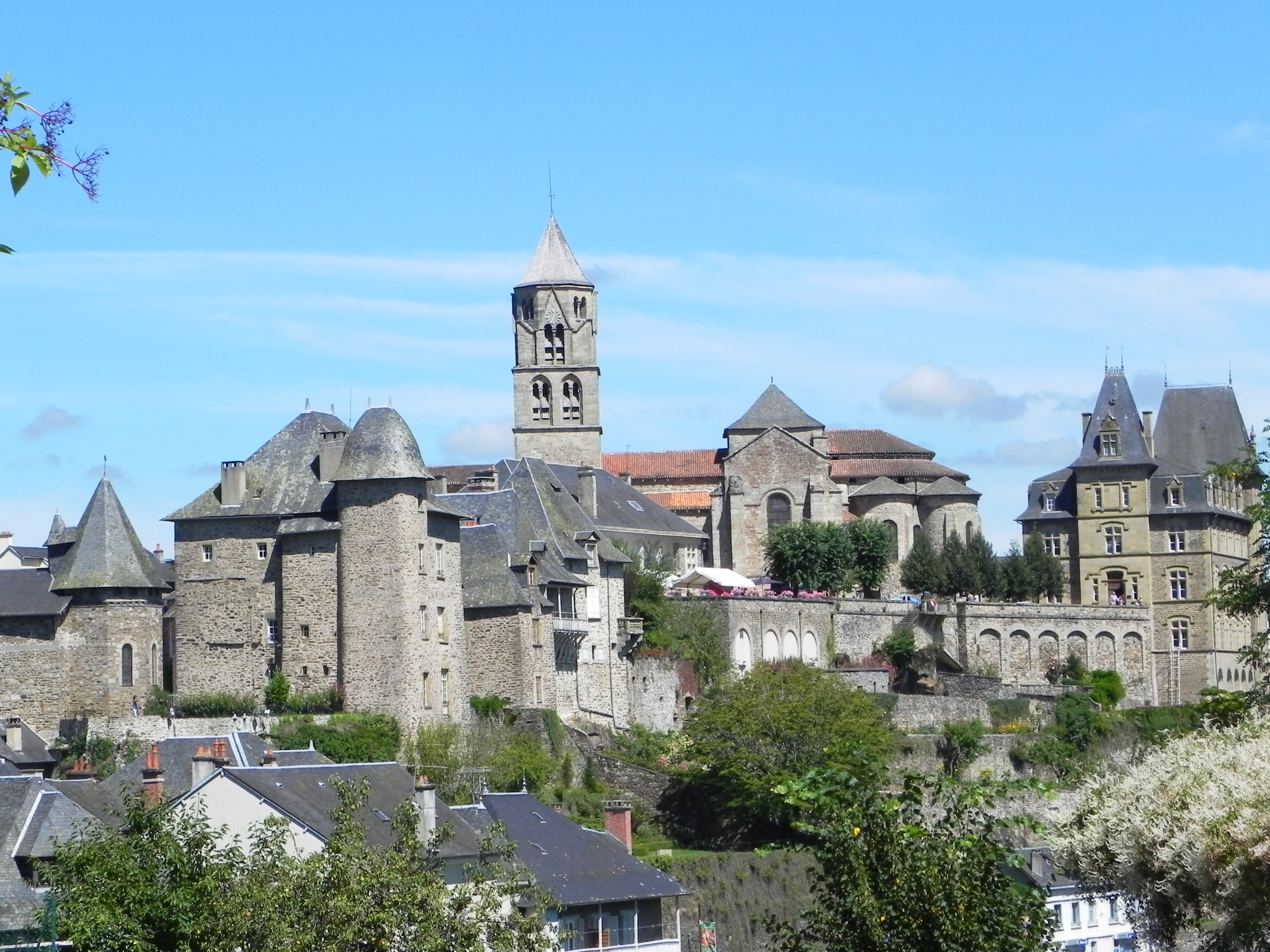
Uzerche

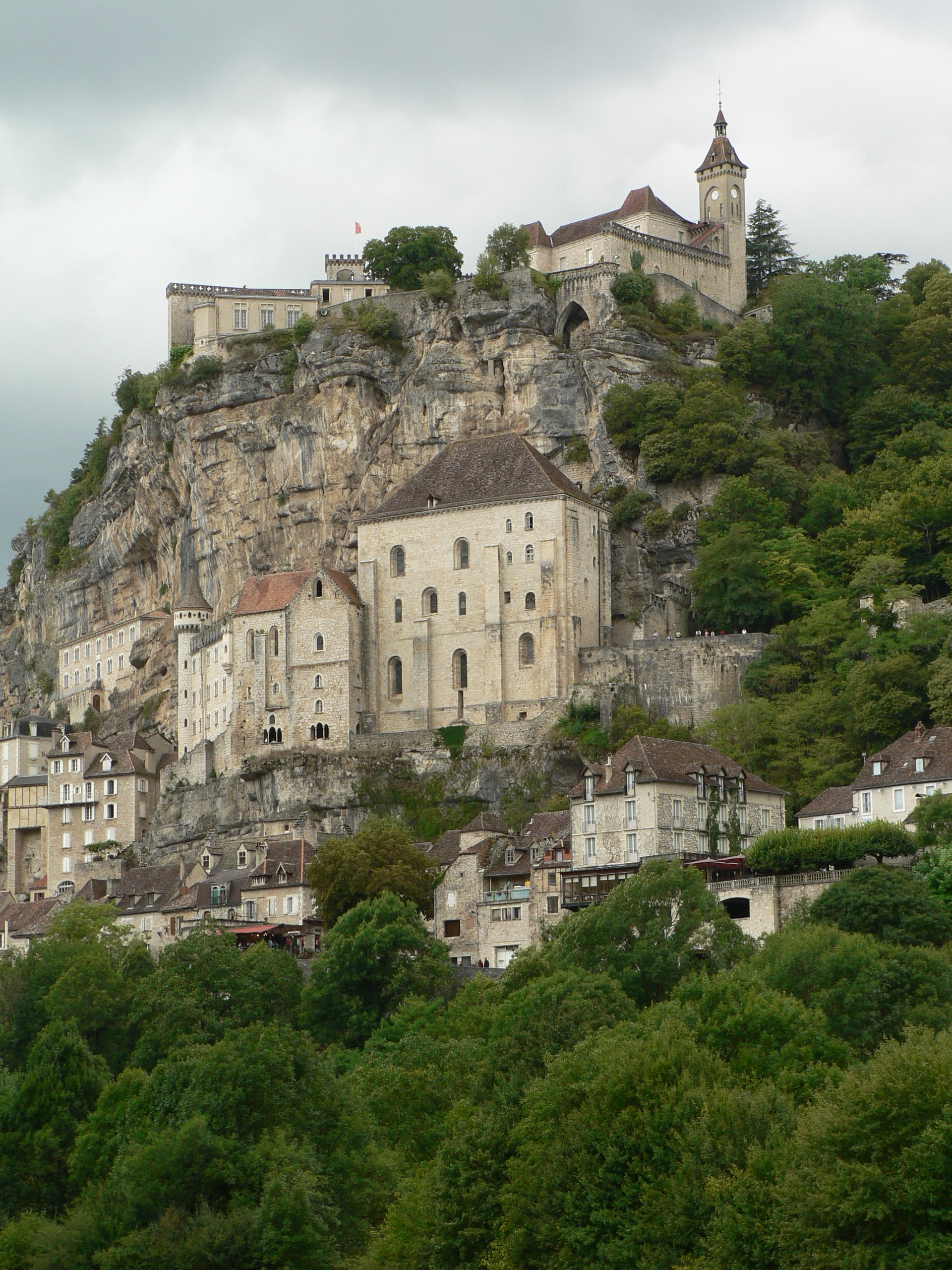
Rocamadour

== England ==
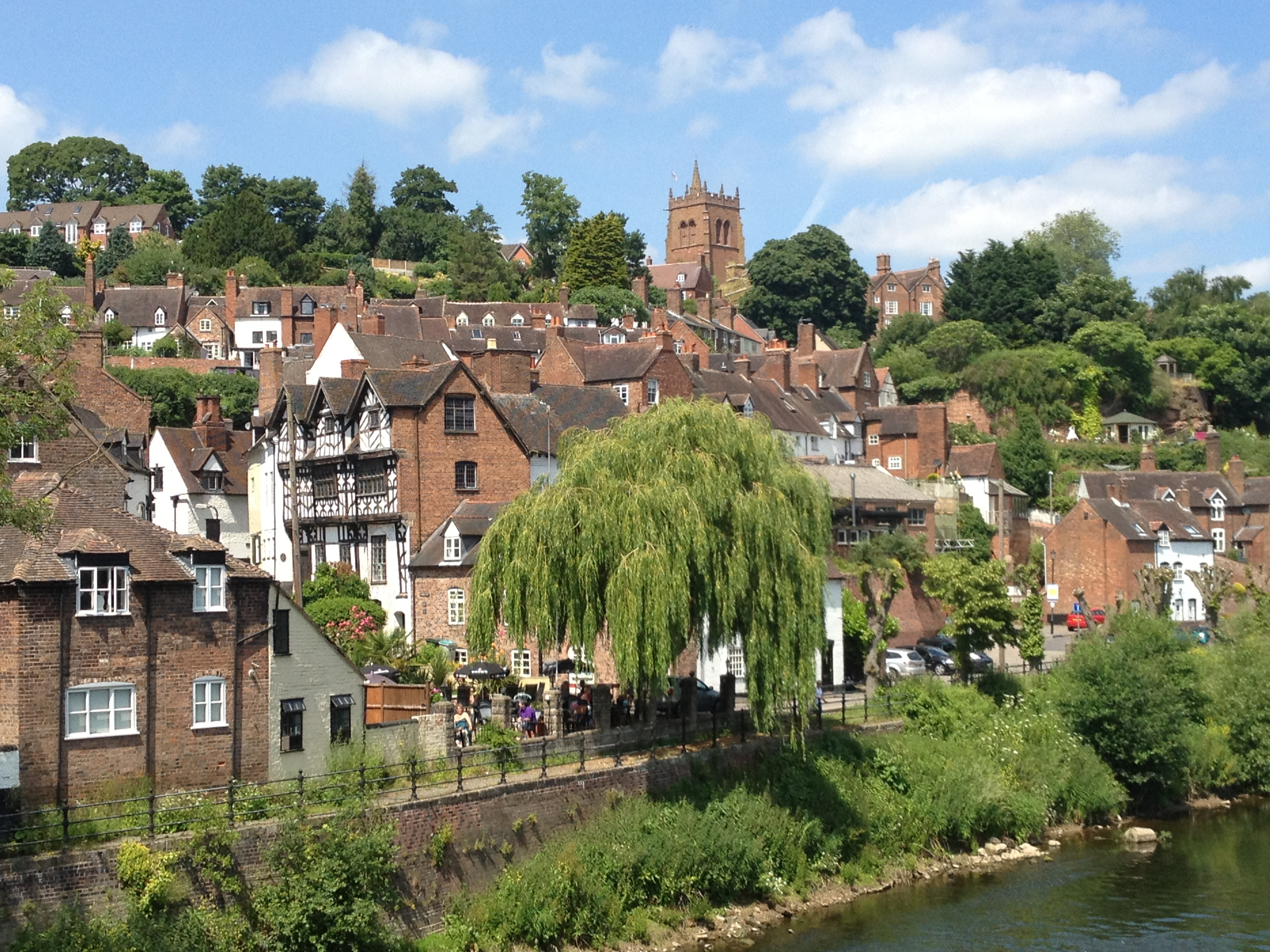
Bridgnorth, Shropshire

Hill towns can be found in any upland area of England, with a major concentration in Pennines, followed by Shropshire, Gloucestershire, Wiltshire, and Dorset. Unlike their Italian counterparts, the English hill towns are not always recognized as a distinct type of settlement. Stephen Owen concentrates on the towns' appearance and proposes a narrow definition for the type: "free-standing small towns set in English upland landscapes where, because of their siting on predominantly convex land shapes, the whole settlement [...] is visible from viewpoints and routes in the surrounding landscape" (this excludes villages with fewer than 2000 occupants that lack complexity and cities with more than 10 000 occupants that cannot be experienced as a whole).

The oldest English precursors to hill towns were Iron Age hill forts and, later, Roman forts. They were located, like many Italian hill towns, on the hilltops. The surviving English hill towns, primarily dating back to the Saxon era, however, are typically placed on hill slopes, mostly along the rivers. Researchers attribute this difference to the political situation of England where the typical power arrangement involved a strong central government, in contrast with Mediterranean politics with its warlord-like intercity rivalry. The slope orientation varies, but just two towns (Allendale Town and Chipping Norton) use a slope oriented to the northwest; naturally there are none using the coldest north-facing slopes. Other siting considerations often overruled the slope orientation, and there are hill towns in England facing the (wettest) west or (windiest) northeast directions.

Some of the English hill towns started as a supply source for a hilltop castle, some have a mining or manufacturing pedigree (mostly wool or textiles due to abundance of water and proximity to the sheep pastures); most evolved to become the centers of trade. There was historically a significant divide in prosperity between the northern (Pennine) hill towns, which often experienced large swings in their fortunes with long periods of downturn, and their southern counterparts (like Shaftesbury), which fared better. In the 21st century most hill towns associate their financial future with the tourist industry.

=== Hill villages ===
Dorothy Sylvester studied smaller hill towns ("hill villages"), excluding larger places like Denbigh or Launceston. As of time of her writing (1947), there were more than a thousand hill villages in England and two hundred in Wales, including the mining towns and church/parsonage combinations. Sylvester selected seven types of terrain used by hill villages: hill-top, ridge-top, ridge, spur, hillside, plateau, marsh-island sites, as well as two catchall categories for hard-to-classify locations (one for high elevations, one for low elevations). All but the few of hill villages are located below the elevation of 1000 feet, almost all are below 800 feet.

== Western colonies ==
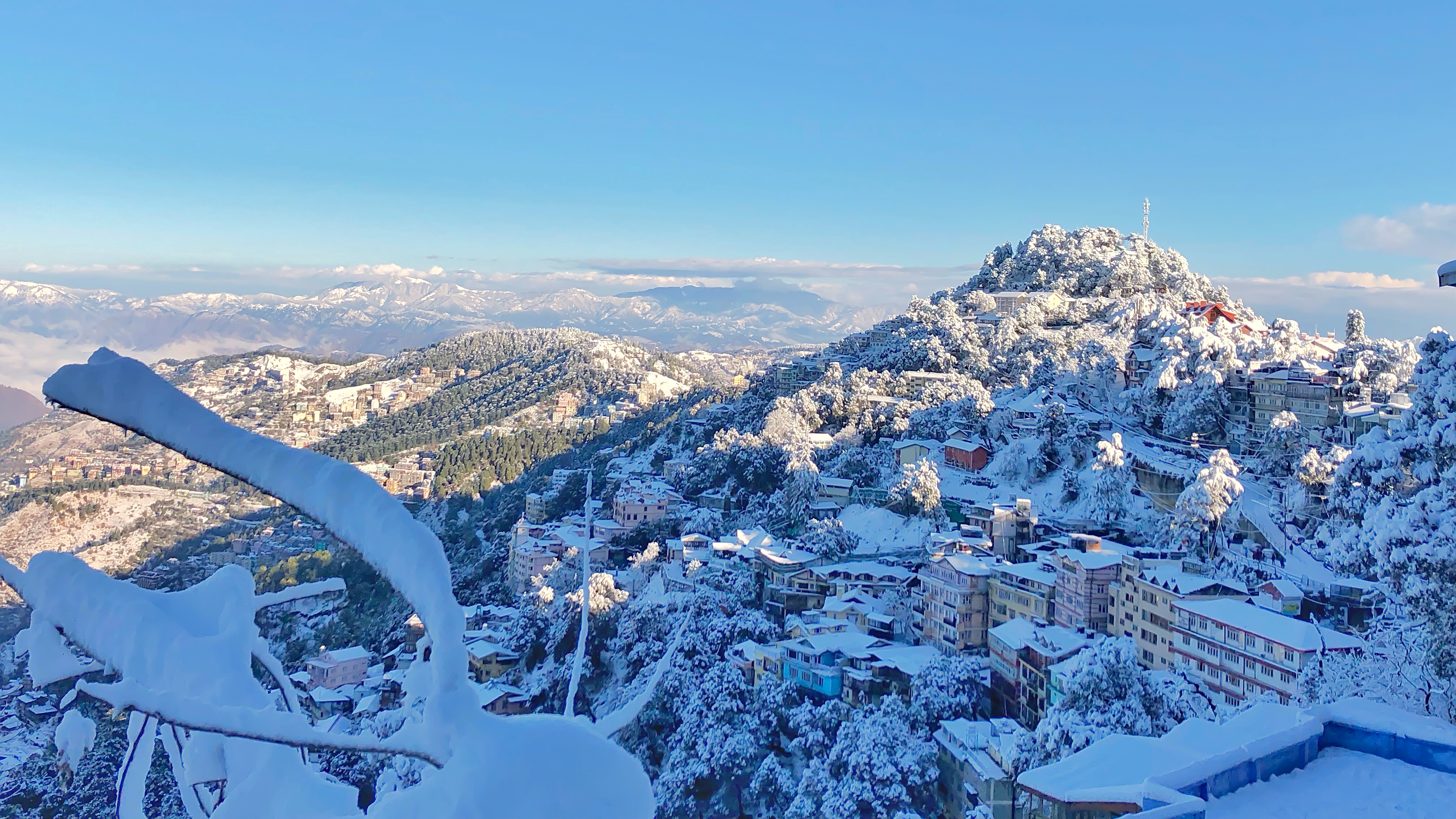
Shimla, a city founded as a hill station, served as the summer capital of British India. The city's urban planning and architecture were designed to foster a European experience for homesick colonial officials and executives.

A hill station is a type of hill town, mostly in colonial Asia, but also in colonial Africa (albeit rarely), founded by European colonists as a refuge from the summer heat. As historian Dane Kennedy observes about the Indian context, "the hill station (...) was seen as an exclusive British preserve: here it was possible to render the Indian into an outsider". The term is still used in present day, particularly in India, which has the largest number of hill stations; most are situated at an altitude of approximately 1,000 to 2,500 metres (3,300 to 8,200 ft).

== Hill town model ==
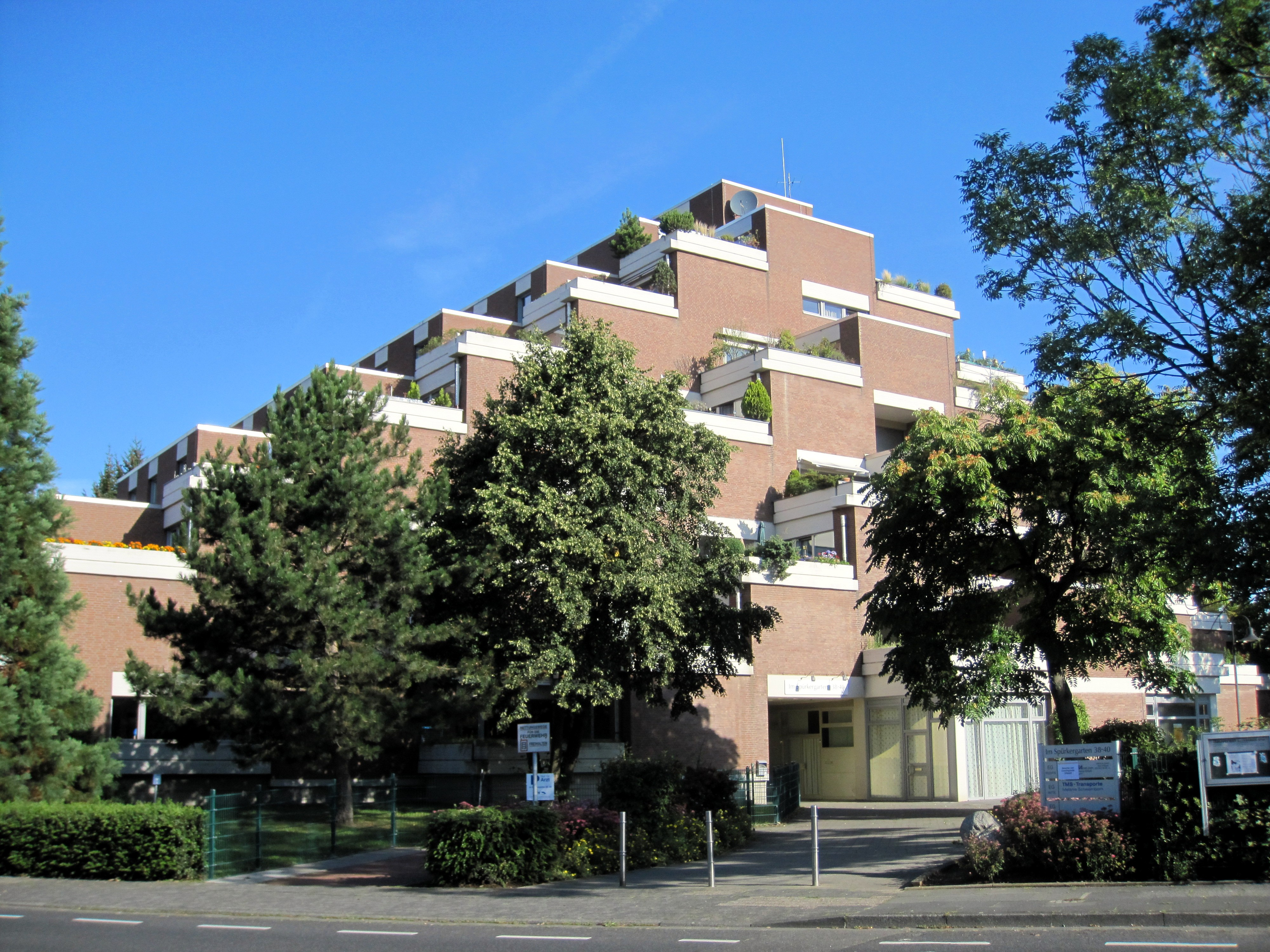
Terrassenhaus

Vernacular architecture of hill towns attracted major interest from architects in the 1950s–1970s as an urban model that would include "hill-town experience". Bernard Rudofsky used hill towns as a model of urban planning that did not match the then-standard "Western" principles established by the Congrès Internationaux d'Architecture Moderne (CIAM) and declared inadequate by Rudofsky.

In Germany, Terrassenhaus buildings by Claus Schmidt, Peter Faller, and Hermann Schröder were erected that combined the idea of a haphazard hill-town with the Teutonic discipline.

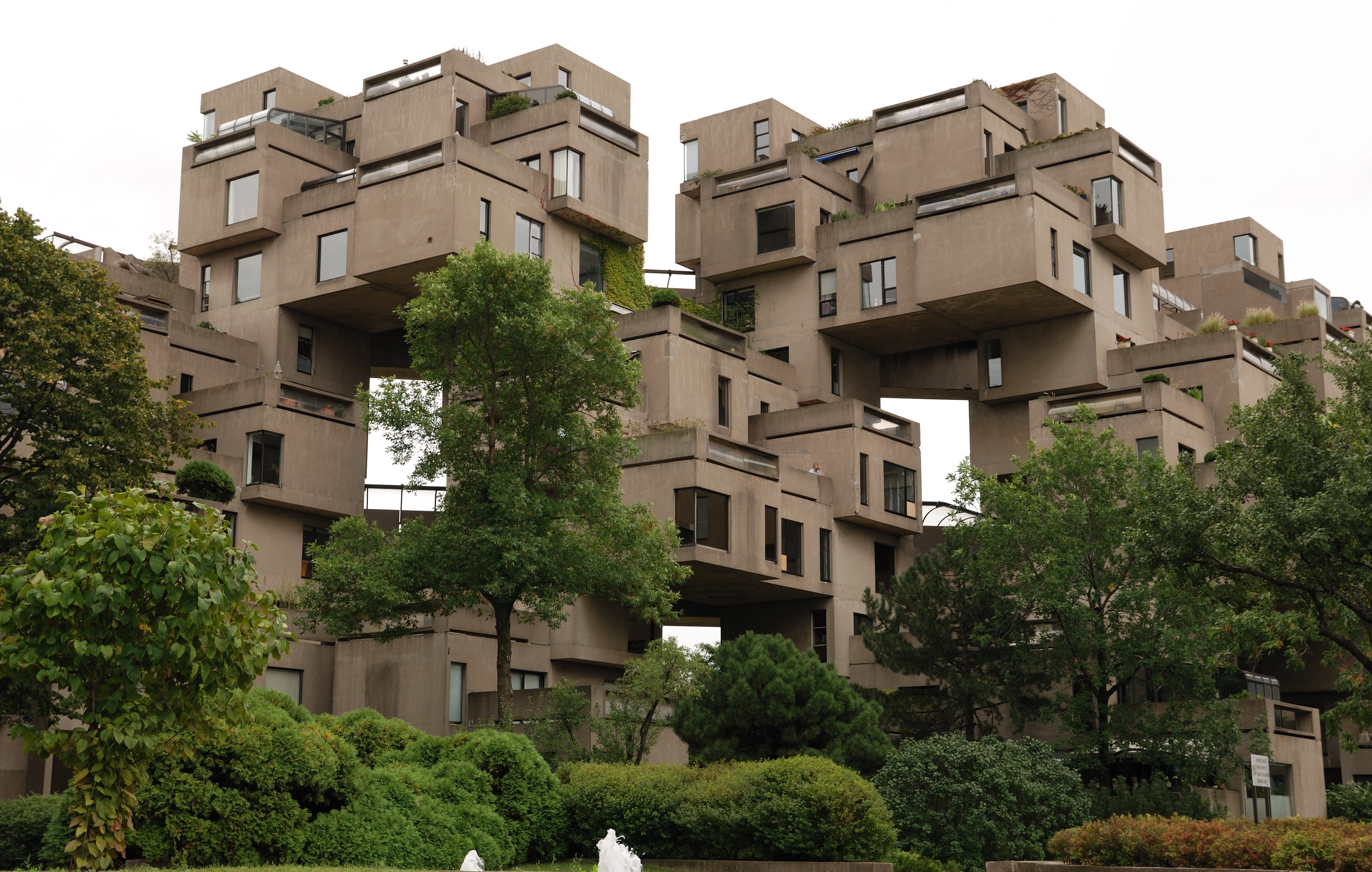
Habitat 67

Jonas Lehrman drew upon hillside houses of Santorini when in 1966 he suggested a low-rise high-density alternative to both sprawling suburbs and city high-rises. Moshe Safdie in 1967 constructed an "absolutely modern hill town", Habitat 67, in Montreal, Canada.

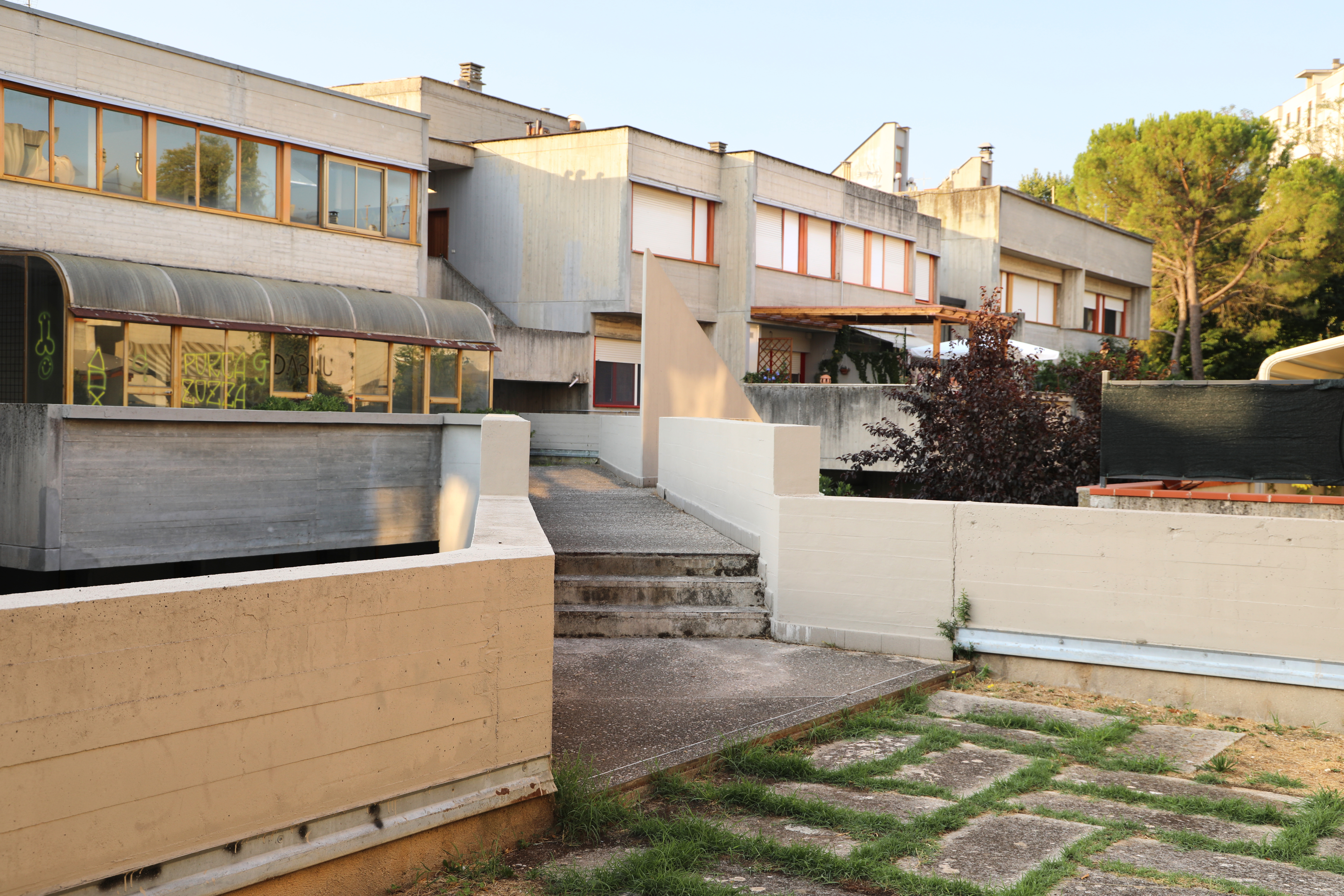
Villaggio Matteotti

Giancarlo De Carlo made major contribution to the hill town model, including the Villaggio Matteotti housing development in Terni (Italy). Drawing on the principles suggested by Lehrman, De Carlo tried to build an environment that resembled neither a city block, nor the low-density housing. Trying to replicate a result of ribbon development, he ended up with housing units of six apartments each, with the latter interconnected by the open-air stairs.

== See also ==
- Hill station, a summer retreat in the British colonies
- List of hilltowns in Northern Italy
- List of hilltowns in Central Italy
- List of hilltowns in Southern Italy
- Hill people

== Sources ==
- Schlimme, Hermann (2016). "The Mediterranean Hill Town: A Travel Paradigm". In Mitrasinovic, Miodrag; Traganou, Jilly (eds.). Travel, Space, Architecture. Burlington: Ashgate. pp. 148–166. ISBN 9781315549712.
- Marshall, Stephen (2005). "Urban Form". Encyclopedia of the City. Routledge. pp. 474–475. ISBN 978-0-415-25225-6.
- Potter, Timothy (1972). "Excavations in the Medieval Centre of Mazzano Romano". Papers of the British School at Rome. 40. Cambridge University Press (CUP): 135–145. doi:10.1017/s0068246200007959. ISSN 0068-2462.
- Brooke, Christopher (2016-04-15). "Cities and towns". Europe in the Central Middle Ages. Routledge. doi:10.4324/9781315839080-8 (inactive 12 July 2025). ISBN 978-1-317-87881-0.
- Kullmann, Karl (2020). "Landshape Urbanism". In Mehta, Vikas; Palazzo, Danilo (eds.). Companion to Public Space (PDF). London; New York: Routledge. pp. 46–58. ISBN 978-1-138-54972-2.
- Kauffman, Richard; Field, Carol (1997). The Hill Towns of Italy. Chronicle Books. ISBN 978-0-8118-1354-9.
- Sereni, Emilio (2014). "The Hilltop Town in the Pastoral Agricultural Landscape of the Italian Middle Ages". History of the Italian Agricultural Landscape. Translated by Litchfield, R. Burr. Princeton University Press. ISBN 978-1-4008-6445-4.
- Grabinger, S. (2012). Central Tuscany: The Casentino and Valtiberina. CreateSpace Independent Publishing Platform. ISBN 978-1-4700-0150-6.
- Gaggio, Dario (2016). The Shaping of Tuscany: Landscape and Society between Tradition and Modernity. Cambridge University Press. ISBN 978-1-316-79080-9.
- Crist, Raymond E. (1957). "The Latifundium: A Neglected Factor in the Evolution of Hill Towns?". Annals of the Association of American Geographers. Abstracts of Papers Presented at the 53rd Annual Meeting of the Association of American Geographers, Cincinnati, Ohio, April 1–4, 1957. 47 (2). Taylor & Francis: 157–158. ISSN 0004-5608. JSTOR 2561506.
- Owen, Stephen (2003). "The Appearance of English Hill Towns in the Landscape". Journal of Urban Design. 8 (1). Informa UK Limited: 3–25. doi:10.1080/1357480032000064746. ISSN 1357-4809.
- Toynbee, Arnold (1967). "Town-planning in the ancient Greek world". Ekistics. 24 (145). Athens Center of Ekistics: 445–448. ISSN 0013-2942. JSTOR 43614633.
- Fryer, Eugénie Mary (1917). The Hill-towns of France. E.P. Dutton.
- Fogarty, Michael John (August 1997). Experiencing the hill towns of central Italy: towards an aesthetic theory with particular emphasis on the nature of the pleasurable response (Master of Architecture thesis). UNSW Sydney. doi:10.26190/UNSWORKS/8274. hdl:1959.4/62908.
- Sylvester, Dorothy (1947). "The Hill Villages of England and Wales". The Geographical Journal. 110 (1/3). [Wiley, Royal Geographical Society (with the Institute of British Geographers)]: 76–93. Bibcode:1947GeogJ.110...76S. doi:10.2307/1789196. ISSN 0016-7398. JSTOR 1789196.
- Mendieta Eid, L.G. (2017). Pueblos Blancos como paisaje de interés cultural [White Villages as a Landscape of Cultural Interest] (Tesis Doctoral Inédita) (in Spanish). Sevilla: Universidad de Sevilla. hdl:11441/71074.
