= Townhill =

Townhill may refer to:

- Townhill, County Fermanagh, a townland in County Fermanagh, Northern Ireland
- Townhill, Fife, a village in Scotland
- Townhill, Swansea, a hill and community in Wales
  - Townhill (electoral ward), an electoral ward
- An area in the town of Hamilton, South Lanarkshire, Scotland
- Townhill Park, a suburb of Southampton

== See also ==
- Town Hill (disambiguation)
- Hill Town, California
- Hilltown (disambiguation)
