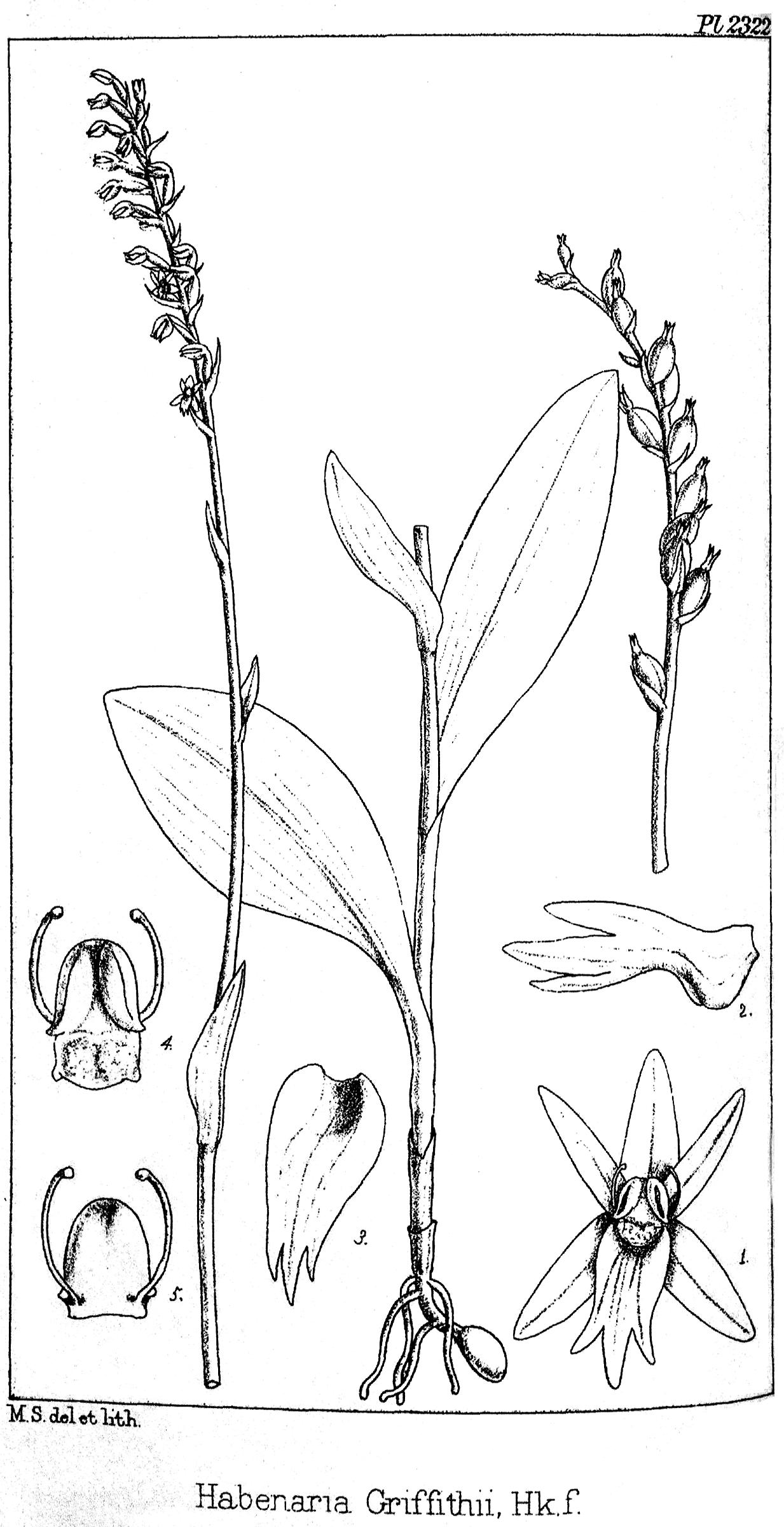

Scientific classification
- Kingdom: Plantae
- Clade: Tracheophytes
- Clade: Angiosperms
- Clade: Monocots
- Order: Asparagales
- Family: Orchidaceae
- Subfamily: Orchidoideae
- Tribe: Orchideae
- Subtribe: Orchidinae
- Genus: Gennaria
- Species: G. griffithii

Binomial name
- Gennaria griffithii (Hook.f.) X.H.Jin & D.Z.Li

Synonyms
- Diphylax griffithii (Hook.f.) Kraenzl.; Dithrix griffithii (Hook.f.) Ormerod & Gandhi; Habenaria griffithii Hook.f.; Nujiangia griffithii (Hook.f.) X.H.Jin & D.Z.Li, genus name superfl. & illegit.; Habenaria decipiens Hook.f., not validly published; Dithrix decipiens Soó, genus name not validly published

= Gennaria griffithii =

Species of plant

Gennaria griffithii is a species of flowering plant in the family Orchidaceae, native from Afghanistan to China. It is a terrestrial species, with a small tuber and small greenish flowers, found in damp places. It has a complicated taxonomic history, having been transferred between genera several times. When placed in a genus on its own it is correctly known as Dithrix griffithii. In 2015, it was transferred to the genus Gennaria.

== Description ==
Gennaria griffithii is a terrestrial orchid, up to 17 cm tall. It has a small underground tuber, 20–30 mm in diameter. There are two or three leaves, 16–18 mm long by 7–14 mm wide. The inflorescence consists of a raceme of 7–12 flowers on a stem (scape) 12–16 cm tall. The flowers which appear in early April in their native habitat are greenish, 5–8 mm long, opening only slightly. The lateral sepals are fused at the base with the labellum, which is tri-lobed, the middle lobe being longer. A small spur is present, 1 mm long.

== Taxonomy ==
=== Nomenclature ===
The nomenclature of this species is complicated, as was explained by Kanchi Gandhi and Paul Omerod in 2012. The species was first described by Joseph Dalton Hooker in 1890. He initially called it "Habenaria decipiens", but later realized that this name had already been published for a different species, and so named it Habenaria griffithii. In 1899, Friedrich Kraenzlin transferred H. griffithii to Diphylax as Diphylax griffithii. In 1929, Károly Soó von Bere attempted to transfer the species to its own separate genus, under the name "Dithrix decipiens". This was doubly invalid, because the genus name "Dithrix" had not been validly published, and griffithii rather than "decipiens" was the published epithet for the species. However, the invalid names were incorrectly included in various sources, including Names in Current Use for Extant Plant Genera published in 1993. This led to the "inadvertent validation" of Dithrix (Hook.f.) Schltr. ex Brummitt, although this was not understood until Gandhi and Omerod's paper in 2012. Unaware that Dithrix had been validated, Xiao-Hua Jin and De-Zhu Li published a new genus name and combination for the species, calling it "Nujiangia griffithii". However, this was a superfluous name. If Hooker's Habenaria griffithii is placed in a separate monotypic genus, then the name that should be used is Dithrix griffithii (Hook.f.) Ormerod & Gandhi.

=== Phylogeny and classification ===
Gennaria griffithii was known for a long time to be isolated within the original genus in which it was placed (Habenaria). In his original description, Hooker had proposed a separate section, Habenaria sect. Dithrix, which later became the genus Dithrix. Kraenzlin placed it in the genus Diphylax (now subsumed into Habenaria). Phylogenetic studies in 2012 and 2014 suggested that it was most closely related to Gennaria, falling outside the main clades containing Habenaria species. This finding was initially used to justify placing H. griffithii in a monospecific genus as Dithrix griffithii. In 2015, an alternative proposal was put forward, namely to move the species into Gennaria. As of March 2018, this proposal has been accepted by sources such as the World Checklist of Selected Plant Families, and Plants of the World Online.

A 2014 cladogram for the subtribe Habenariinae shows the two species now placed in Gennaria to be basal within one of the three main "superclades" (labelled C, D and E) making up the tribe:

- Habenariinae
  - - superclades C and D
  - superclade E
    - - Gennaria diphylla
      - Gennaria griffithii
    - 24 species of Habenaria from Africa, Asia and Southern America, and two species of Botanea from Africa

== Distribution and habitat ==
Gennaria griffithii is native from Afghanistan through Pakistan and the western Himalayas into China (Yunnan). It is also found in south-west India. It typically grows along the banks of rivers.
