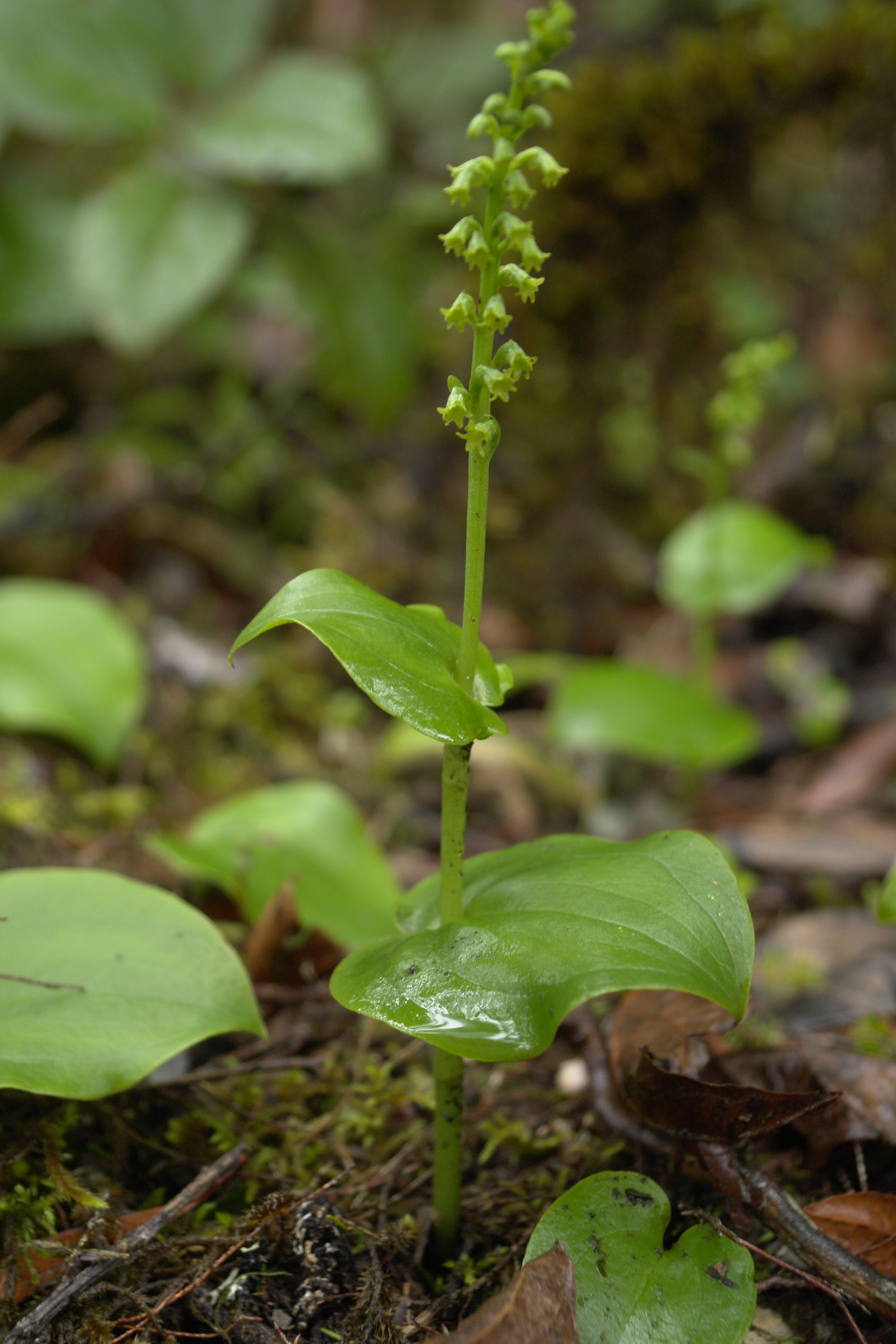
- Gennaria diphylla

Scientific classification
- Kingdom: Plantae
- Clade: Tracheophytes
- Clade: Angiosperms
- Clade: Monocots
- Order: Asparagales
- Family: Orchidaceae
- Subfamily: Orchidoideae
- Subtribe: Orchidinae
- Genus: Gennaria; Parl.

= Gennaria =

Genus of orchids

Gennaria is a genus of flowering plants in the orchid family, Orchidaceae. For many years it contained only one species, Gennaria diphylla. A second species, Gennaria griffithii, was added in 2015. The genus name honours Patrizio Gennari, Italian botanist and patriot.

== Species ==
As of March 2018, two species are accepted:

- Gennaria diphylla Link) Parl. – Macaronesia, north-west Africa, south-west Europe
- Gennaria griffithii (Hook.f.) X.H.Jin & D.Z.Li – Afghanistan to China

== See also ==
- List of Orchidaceae genera
