= Montefiore dell'Aso =

- Comune
- Comune di Montefiore dell'Aso
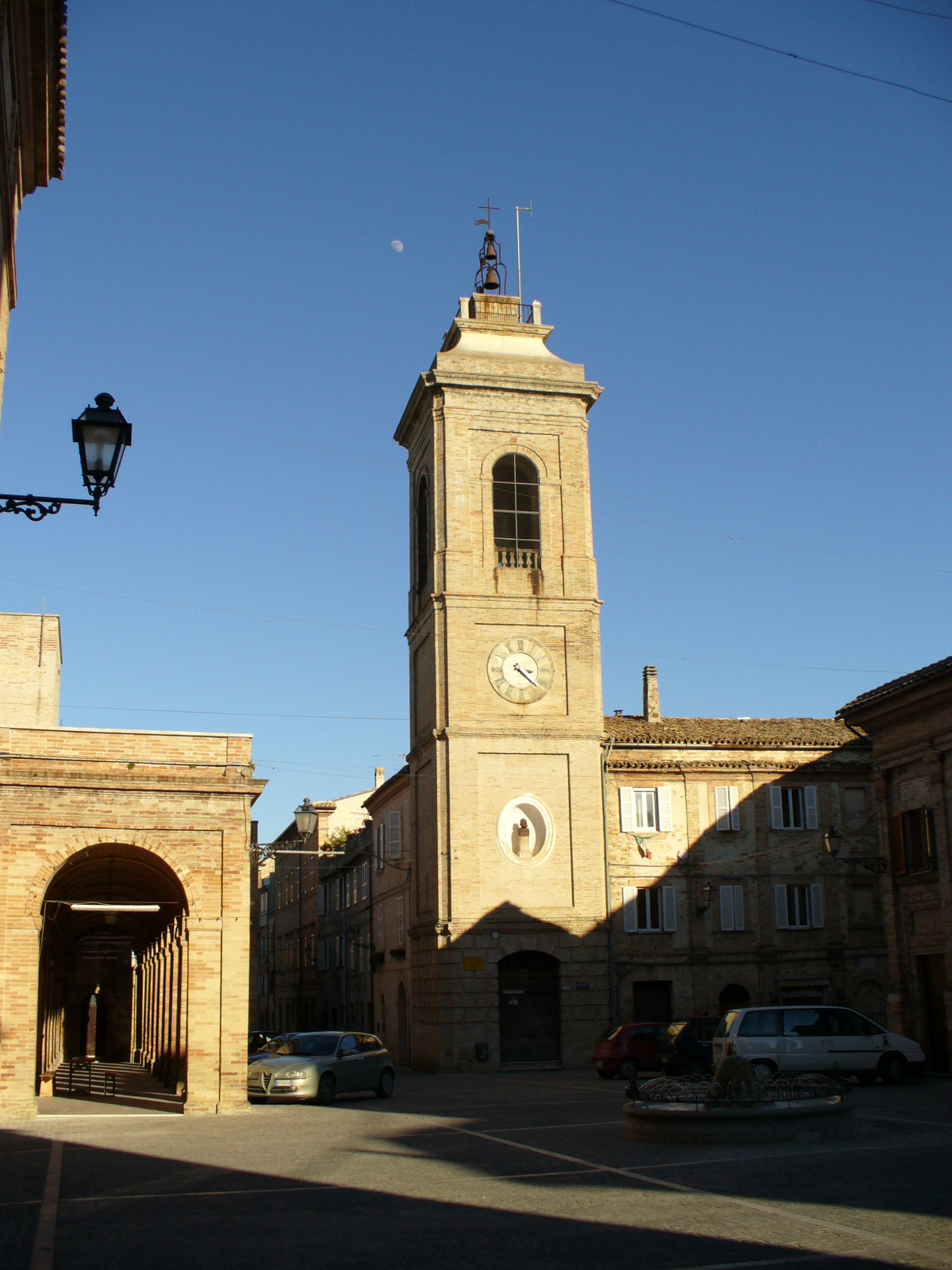
- Square of Montefiore with bell tower, fountain and loggia

- Coat of arms

- Location within Italy Location within Marche
- Coordinates: 43°3′N 13°45′E
- Country: Italy
- Region: Marche
- Province: Ascoli Piceno (AP)

Government
  - Mayor: Achille Castelli

Area
  - Total: 28.1 km^{2} (10.8 sq mi)
- Elevation: 412 m (1,352 ft)

Population (28 February 2010)
  - Total: 2,220
  - Density: 79.0/km^{2} (205/sq mi)
- Demonym: Montefiorani
- Time zone: UTC+1 (CET)
  - Summer (DST): UTC+2 (CEST)
- Postal code: 63010
- Dialing code: 0734
- Patron saint: Saint Lucy
- Saint day: December 13
- Website: Official website

Montefiore dell'Aso is a comune (municipality) in the Province of Ascoli Piceno in the Italian region Marche, located about 70 kilometres (43 mi) southeast of Ancona and about 25 kilometres (16 mi) northeast of Ascoli Piceno.

One of several Hilltowns in Central Italy, Montefiore dell'Aso borders the following municipalities: Campofilone, Carassai, Lapedona, Massignano, Monterubbiano, Moresco, Petritoli, Ripatransone. It is one of I Borghi più belli d'Italia ("The most beautiful villages of Italy").

Historical sights include the Romanesque-Gothic church of St. Francis, housing the sepulchres of Cardinal Gentile Partino (1310) and painter Adolfo de Carolis, while the apses has frescoes by the Master of Offida.
