= Castrovalva (M. C. Escher) =

Lithograph print by M. C. Escher

- Artist: M. C. Escher
- Year: 1930
- Type: Lithograph
- Dimensions: 53 cm × 42.1 cm (21 in × 16.6 in)

Castrovalva is a lithograph print by the Dutch artist M. C. Escher, first printed in February 1930. Like many of Escher's early works, it depicts a place that he visited on a tour of Italy.

It depicts the Abruzzo village of Castrovalva, which lies at the top of a sheer slope. The perspective is toward the northwest, from the narrow trail on the left which, at the point from which this view is seen, makes a hairpin turn to the right, descending to the valley. In the foreground at the side of the trail, there are several flowering plants, grasses, ferns, a beetle and a snail. In the expansive valley below there are cultivated fields and two more towns, the nearest of which is Anversa degli Abruzzi, with Casale in the distance.

== In popular culture ==
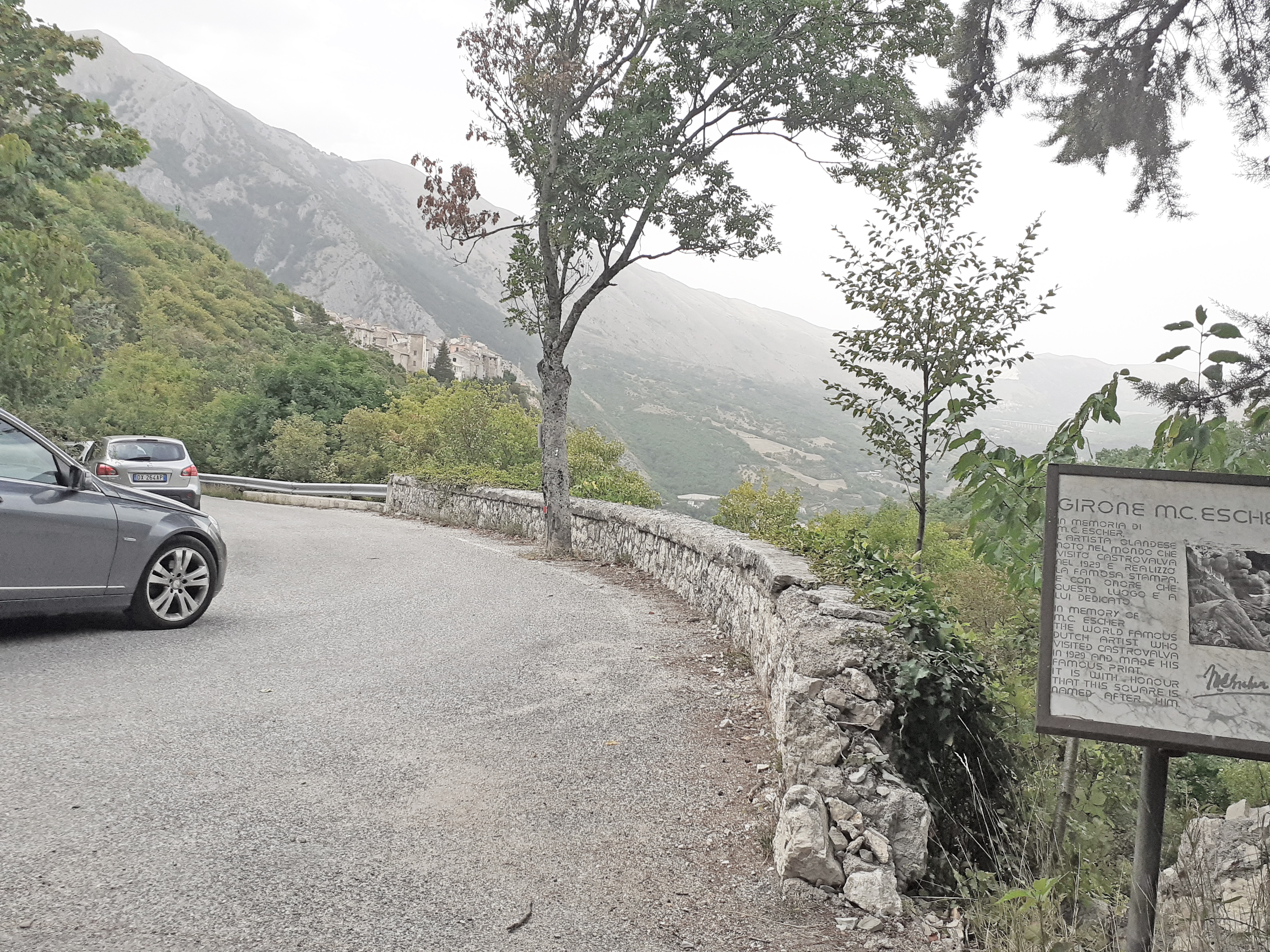
Seen from the bend where Escher made the lithograph

- In 1982 the name "Castrovalva" was used in a story in the BBC television series Doctor Who. The storyline also relied heavily on recursion, a favorite theme in Escher's later and more famous works, and used ideas taken from Belvedere, Ascending and Descending, and Relativity to trap the protagonists in the city of Castrovalva.
- The comic Kingdom of the Wicked is set in an imaginary world named Castrovalva.

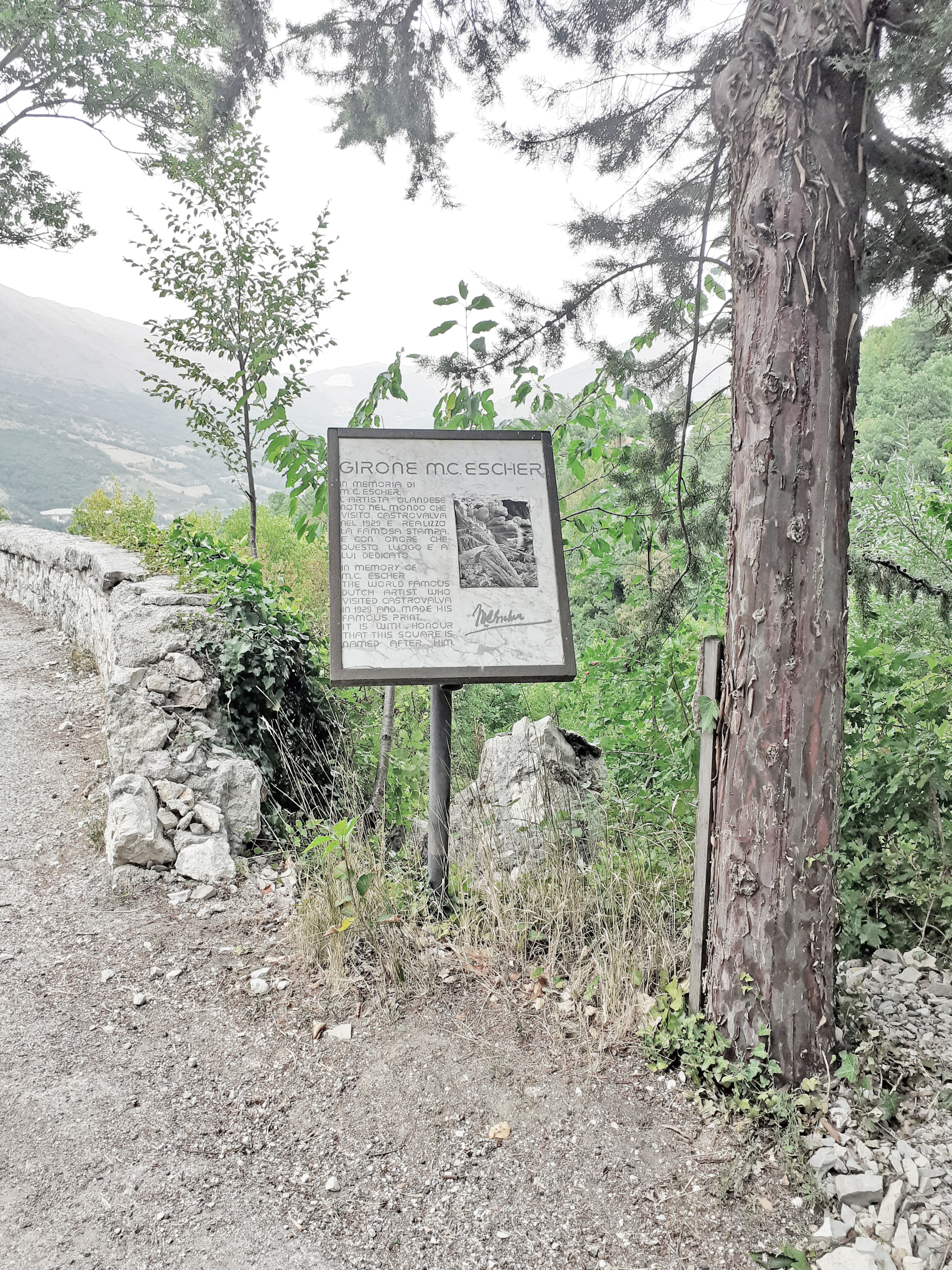
Plaque dedicated to Escher located near the bend where the Dutch artist made the lithograph

== Sources ==
- Locher, J.L. (2000). The Magic of M. C. Escher. Harry N. Abrams, Inc. ISBN 0-8109-6720-0.
