= Norman Castle (Anversa degli Abruzzi) =

Norman castle
- Castello normanno
- Anversa degli Abruzzi
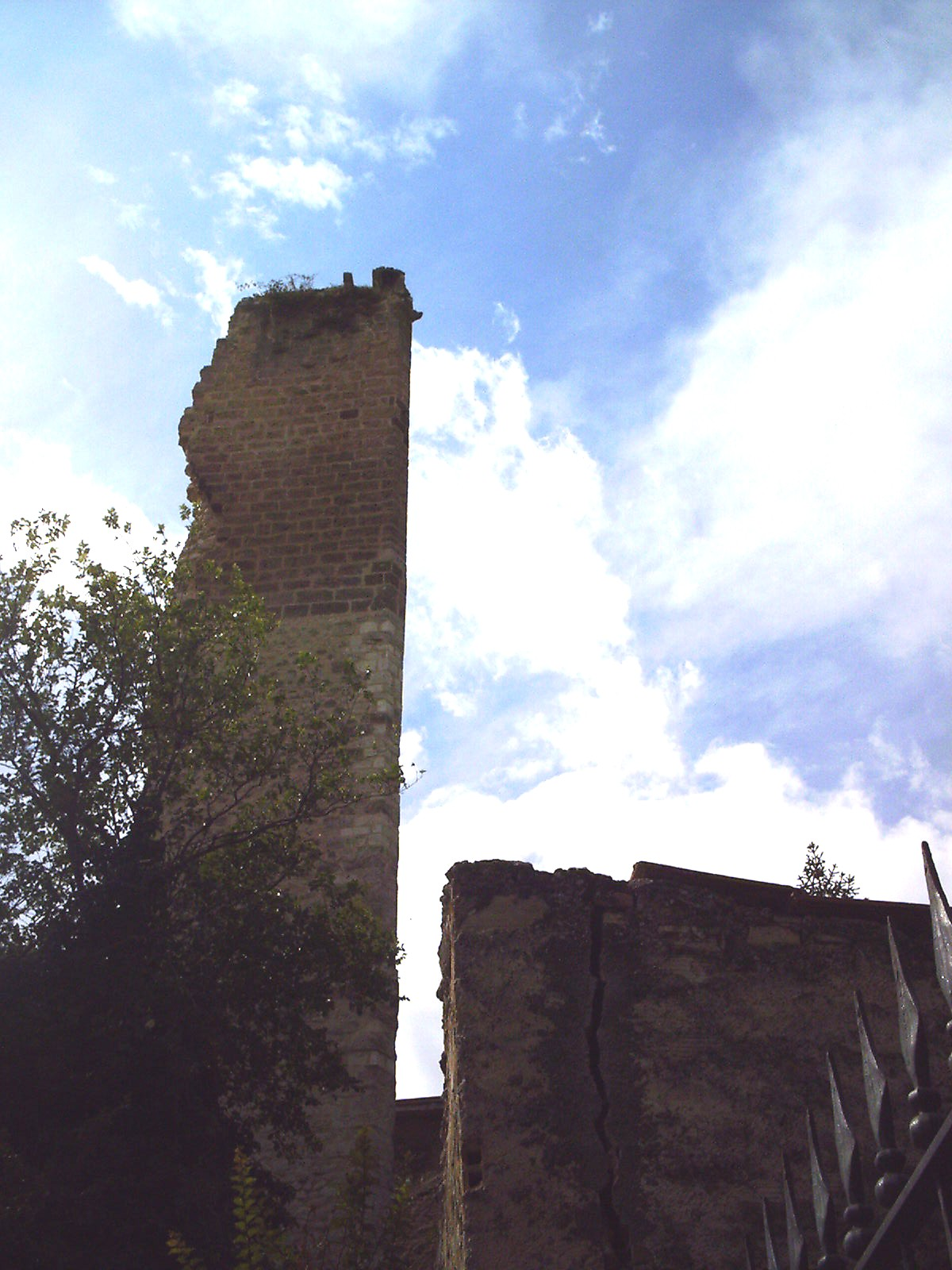
- Norman castle in Anversa degli Abruzzi

Site information
- Type: Castle

Location
- Coordinates: 41.994038°N 13.802572°E

Site history
- Built: 15th century

Castello normanno (Italian for Norman castle) is a Middle Ages-18th century castle in Anversa degli Abruzzi, Province of L'Aquila Abruzzo, central-southern Italy.

== History ==
The castle was built by Antonio di Sangro in 15th century on the ruins of a preexisting tower of 12th-13th century.

Now it is a private property and it has been used by Gabriele D'Annunzio as location for his tragedy La fiaccola sotto il moggio.

== Architecture ==
The castle main body is a parallelepiped built in stone, with the ruins of a tower on a side.

The main body hosts the Chapel of St Michael the Archangel.
