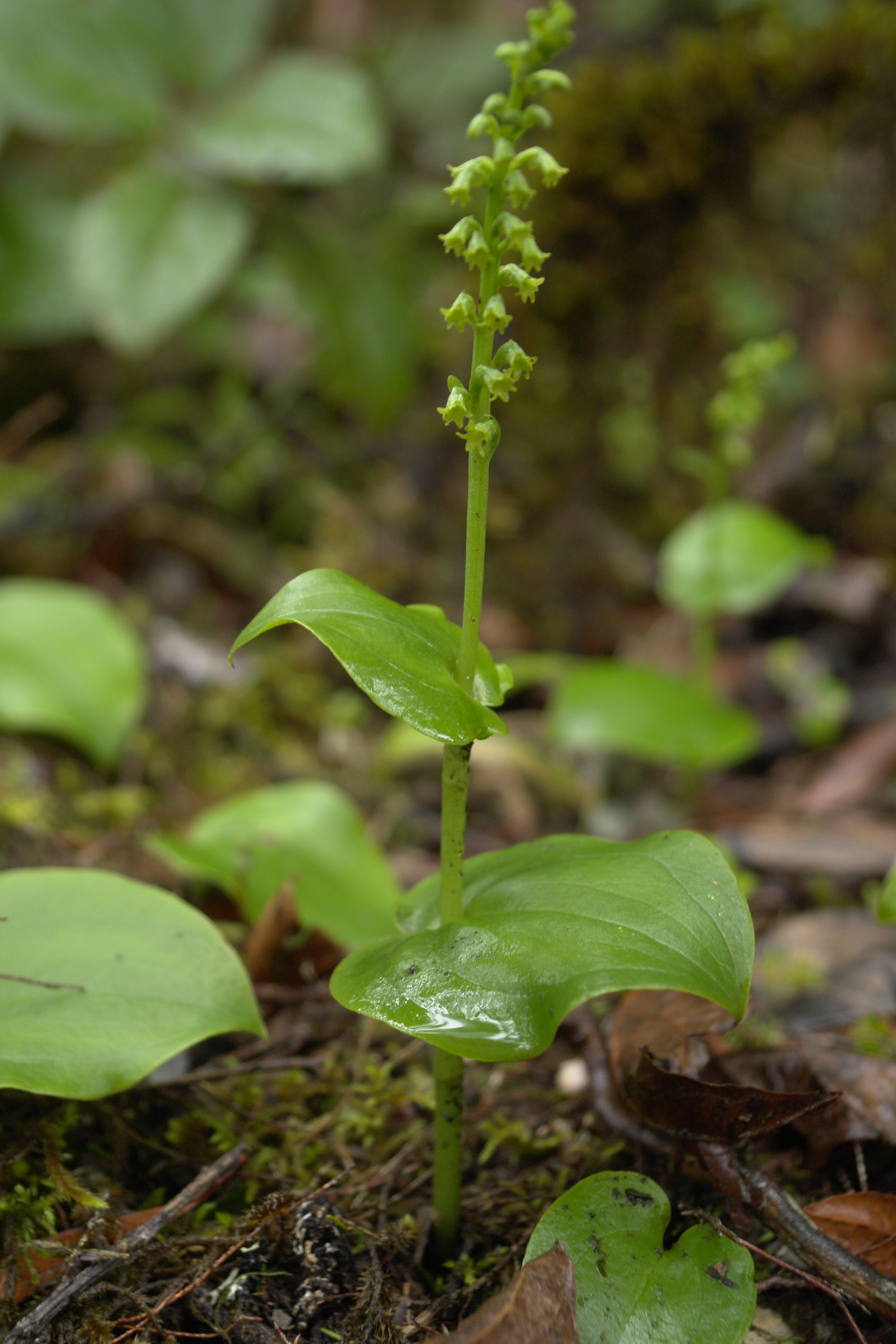

Scientific classification
- Kingdom: Plantae
- Clade: Tracheophytes
- Clade: Angiosperms
- Clade: Monocots
- Order: Asparagales
- Family: Orchidaceae
- Subfamily: Orchidoideae
- Genus: Gennaria
- Species: G. diphylla

Binomial name
- Gennaria diphylla (Link) Parl.

Synonyms
- Satyrium diphyllum Link; Gymnadenia diphylla (Link) Link; Platanthera diphylla (Link) Rchb.f.; Coeloglossum diphyllum (Link) Fiori & Paol.; Orchis diphylla (Link) Samp.; Orchis cordifolia Munby

= Gennaria diphylla =

Species of orchid

Gennaria diphylla is a species of flowering plant from the orchid family, Orchidaceae, native to the region from the western Mediterranean and Macaronesia (Canary Islands, Madeira, Portugal, Spain, the Balearic Islands, Morocco, Algeria, Tunisia, Sardinia, Tuscany). Gennaria diphylla was illustrated (as Habenaria cordata) in plate 3164 of Curtis' Botanical Magazine, 1832.

== Description ==
Gennaria diphylla has a stem about 15–30 cm tall. The stem bears two leaves. The lower leaf is larger, 4–7 cm long and 2.5–7 cm wide. The upper leaf is considerably smaller. Both leaves are elliptical or ovate in shape, with rounded lobes at the base making it heart-shaped. The flowers are borne in a spike up to 10 cm long. They are yellowish-green and form a bell-like shape. The lip (labellum) has three lobes, the middle one being slightly longer. A spur is present.

== Taxonomy ==
Gennaria diphylla was first described, as Satyrium diphyllum, by Johann Link in 1799. Filippo Parlatore transferred the species to his newly created genus Gennaria in 1860. The genus name honours Patrizio Gennari. The specific epithet diphylla means "two-leaved".
