= Patrizio Gennari =

Italian botanist and scientist (1820–1897)

- Born: 24 November 1820; Moresco, Italy
- Died: 1 February 1897 (aged 76); Cagliari, Italy
- Scientific career
- Fields: Botany
- Author abbrev. (botany): Gennari

Patrizio Gennari (24 November 1820, in Moresco – 1 February 1897, in Cagliari) was an Italian botanist and patriot. He served in the Second Italian War of Independence (the Austro-Sardinian War). From 1866 to 1892, he was a professor at the University of Cagliari, Sardinia, and director of the university's botanic garden, the Orto Botanico dell'Università di Cagliari. The orchid genus Gennaria is named after him.
