= List of hilltowns in Southern Italy =

This is a list of hilltowns in southern Italy.

- Abruzzo
  - Anversa degli Abruzzi
  - Castel del Monte
  - Castelli
  - Castrovalva (Abruzzi)
  - Chieti
  - Guardiagrele
  - Introdacqua
  - Pacentro
  - Pescocostanzo
  - Pettorano sul Gizio
  - Pietracamela
  - Roccascalegna
  - Santo Stefano di Sessanio
  - Scanno
  - Tagliacozzo
- Campania
  - Ariano Irpino
  - Cusano Mutri
  - Frigento
  - Gesualdo
  - Greci
  - Guardia Lombardi
  - Lacedonia
  - Montaguto
  - Montecalvo Irpino
  - Montefalcone di Val Fortore
  - Montefusco
  - Montemiletto
  - Trevico
  - Villanova del Battista
- Apulia
  - Bovino
  - Castelnuovo della Daunia
  - Monteleone di Puglia
  - Panni
  - Roseto Valfortore
  - San Marco la Catola
  - Sant'Agata di Puglia
- Basilicata
  - Anzi
  - Ferrandina
  - Forenza
  - Grassano
  - Nemoli
  - Pietrapertosa
  - Rivello
  - Salandra
- Calabria
  - Albidona
  - Alessandria del Carretto
  - Bova
  - Castroregio
  - Montegiordano
  - Santa Severina
- Molise
  - Fornelli
  - Frosolone
  - Oratino
  - Sepino
- Sicily
  - Agira
  - Buccheri
  - Calascibetta
  - Centuripe
  - Enna
  - Erice
  - Floresta
  - Gangi
  - Montalbano Elicona
  - San Mauro Castelverde
  - Savoca
  - Troina
