= Castrovalva, Anversa degli Abruzzi =

Castrovalva
- Frazione
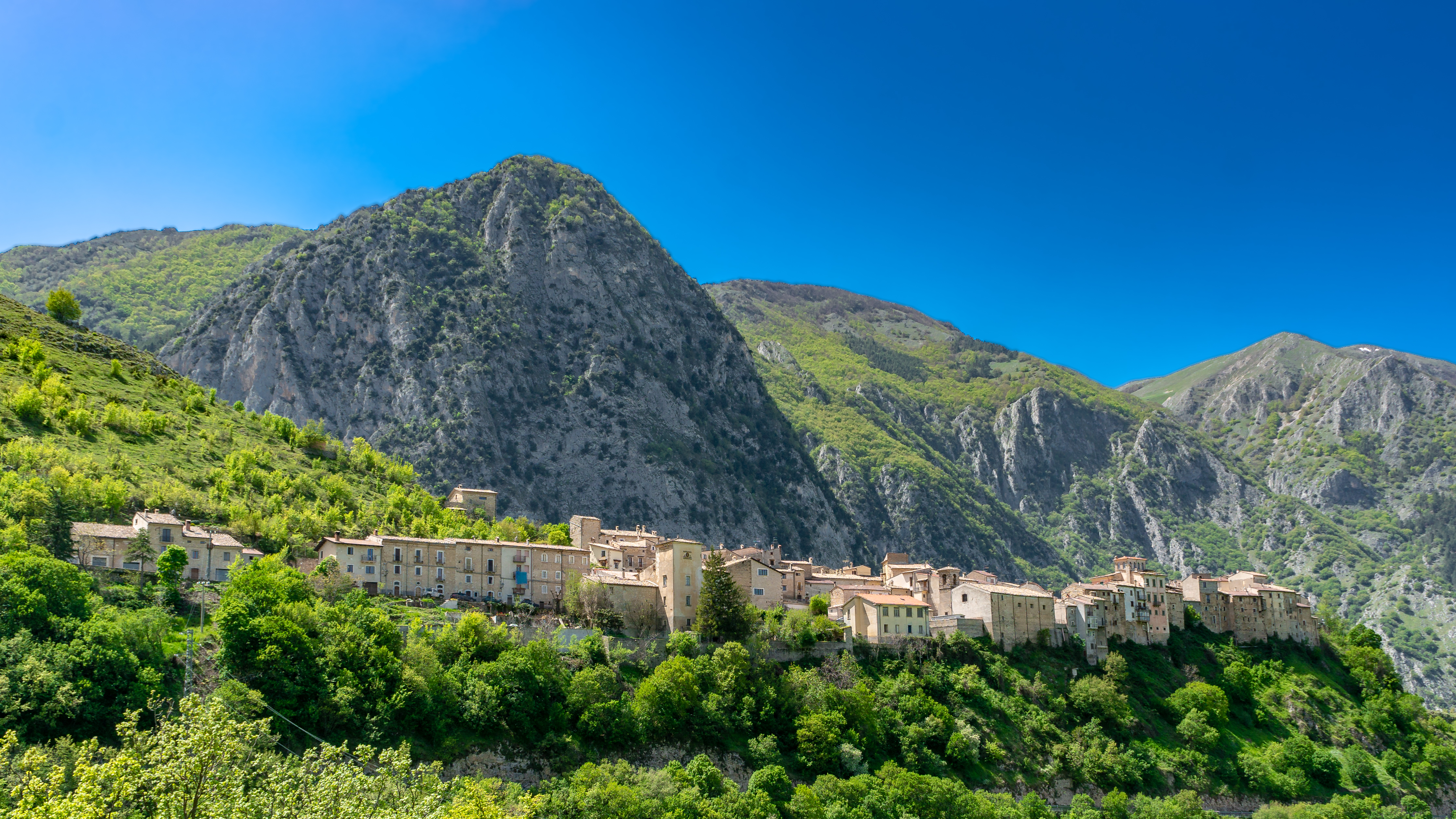
- View of Castrovalva.

- Location within Italy
- Coordinates: 41°59′00″N 13°48′48″E
- Country: Italy
- Region: Abruzzo
- Province: L'Aquila
- Commune: Anversa degli Abruzzi

Population (2001)
  - Total: 56
- Time zone: UTC+1 (CET)
  - Summer (DST): UTC+2 (CEST)

Castrovalva is a frazione of Anversa degli Abruzzi, a comune in the Province of L'Aquila in the Abruzzo, region of Italy. The village, which clings to the top of a steep hill, was depicted in M.C. Escher's 1930 lithograph "Castrovalva". The first serial of the 19th season in the British science fiction television series Doctor Who is entitled Castrovalva, which was first broadcast in 1982, was named after this lithograph.

== Films ==
- Tucci in Italy, Season 1, Episode 4 (2025)

== See also ==
- Hilltowns in Italy
