= Town Hill (Massachusetts) =

- Location within Massachusetts Location within the United States

Highest point
- Elevation: 56 ft (17 m)
- Coordinates: 42°03′16″N 70°11′28″W

Geography
- Location: Cape Cod, Massachusetts
- Topo map: USGS Provincetown

Town Hill is a summit at the northern end of the Outer Cape of Cape Cod in Barnstable County, Massachusetts. It is located in Provincetown. It is the location of the Pilgrim Monument. Oak Head is located north-northeast of Town Hill, and the Race Point Light is on the coast to the north.
