= Moresco =

- Comune
- Comune di Moresco
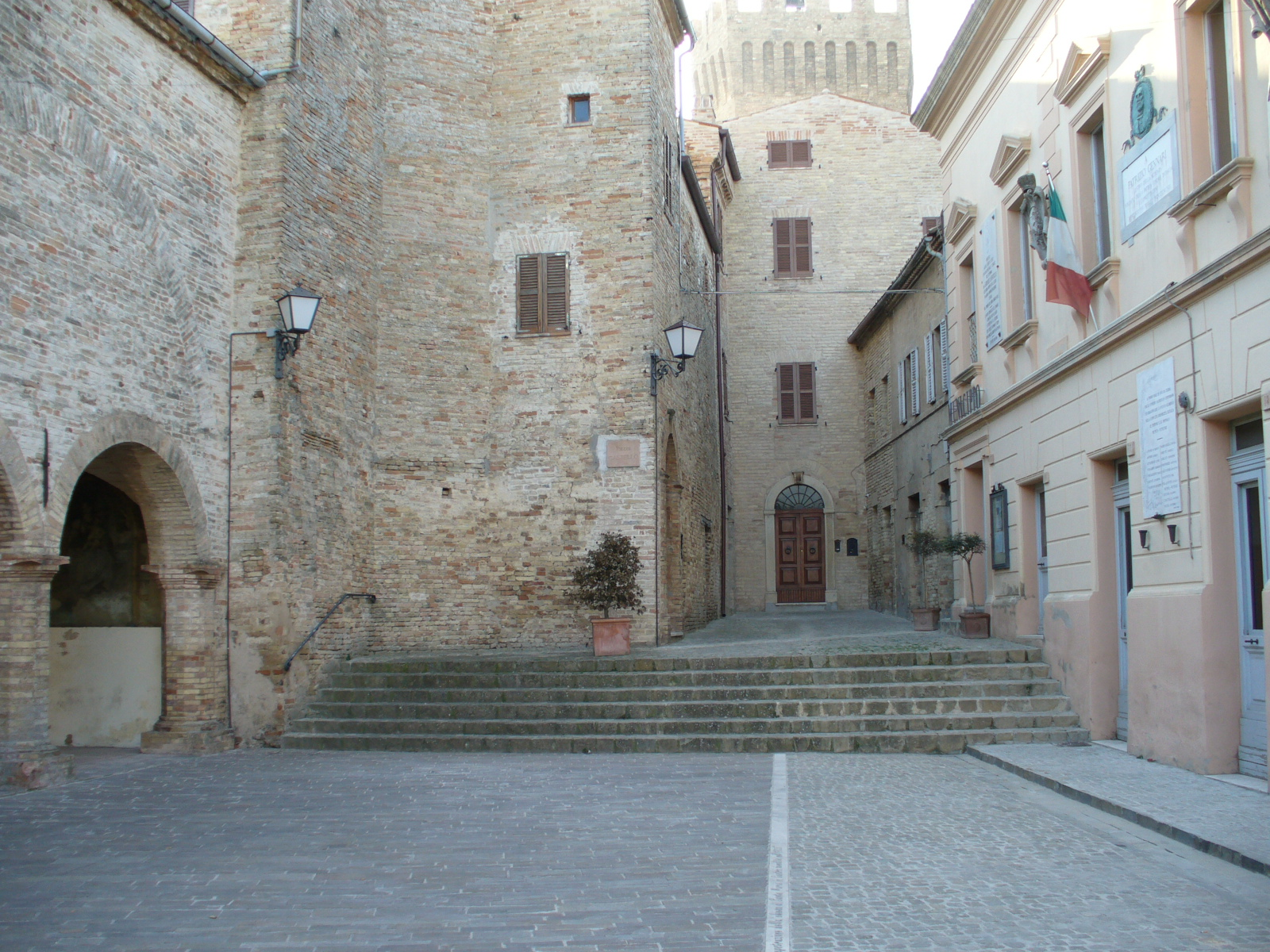
- Piazza di Moresco

- Location within Italy Location within Marche
- Coordinates: 43°5′N 13°44′E
- Country: Italy
- Region: Marche
- Province: Province of Fermo (FM)

Government
  - Mayor: Adv. Amato Mercuri

Area
  - Total: 6.3 km^{2} (2.4 sq mi)
- Elevation: 405 m (1,329 ft)

Population (2011)
  - Total: 606
  - Density: 96/km^{2} (250/sq mi)
- Demonym: Moreschini
- Time zone: UTC+1 (CET)
  - Summer (DST): UTC+2 (CEST)
- Postal code: 63826
- Dialing code: 0039 0734 259983
- Patron saint: St. Lauren
- Saint day: 10 August
- Website: Official website

Moresco is a comune (municipality) in the Province of Fermo in the Italian region Marche, located about 60 kilometres (37 mi) southeast of Ancona and about 30 kilometres (19 mi) northeast of Ascoli Piceno in the valley named Valdaso. As of 2011, it had a population of 606 and an area of 6.3 square kilometres (2.4 mi^{2}).

Moresco borders the following municipalities: Lapedona, Montefiore dell'Aso, Monterubbiano. It is one of I Borghi più belli d'Italia ("The most beautiful villages of Italy").

== Meaning of name ==
Moresco means literary "Moorish". According to legend, at the time of their raids along the Adriatic coast, a group of Moors went further into the interior in order to build a fortress in the heart of Christianity. Others, on the contrary, maintain that the Castrum Morisci was built near the sea to drive back the assaults of the Saracens. Most probably the place name comes either from a noble family named Mori, or from the word in dialect morrecine, which refers to the heap of stones on which the castle rests.

== Sightseeing ==
- The outline on the horizon that immediately identifies Moresco is that of its 12th-century heptagonal tower, standing 25 metres (82 ft) high: why it was built with such an unusual number of seven sides is not at all clear – perhaps merely to distinguish it from the other watch towers in the defence system of Fermo. From the top of the tower on a clear day our gaze wanders from Mount Conero to the Gran Sasso mountain and onwards over to the coast of Albania.
- The large 16th-century bell still chimes every day in alternate succession with the bell on the Clock tower built to guard and defend the old entrance to the castle.
- After walking under the Clock tower, we come to the church of St. Sofia, whose original use has since changed: known as lu teatrì, it became a small theatre after its desecration. According to tradition it was built to commemorate a young lady, Sofia Amati, who had been raped and killed. Others believe that the mother of Saint Sofia was born in the castle. The church holds an interesting fresco by the school of Carlo Crivrelli (1430–95).
- Also worth a visit outside the town walls is the Sanctuary of the Madonna della Salute and the Church of St. Maria dell’Olmo, in particular, which was enlarged in 1521 to include an ancient Gothic shrine, which divides it into two parts with two different altars. Vincenzo Pagani was asked to embellish the altars, which he did by painting the fresco of the Crucifixion and the altar-piece of the Madonna kept in the Council Room.

== History ==
- 1083, the name of Moresco is found for the first time in a parchment kept at Fermo.
- 1146, Tebaldus comes (Count) de Morisco is the lord of the castle who is named in some notarial deeds.
- 1248, the castle of Moresco is returned to the town of Fermo by Cardinal Raniero, the Apostolic Legate, after it had been taken away by the Emperor Frederick 2nd.
- 1266, the lords of Moresco sell the fortress to the Doge of Venice and podestà of Fermo, Lorenzo Tiepolo, for 500 Volterra lira.
- 1433, Count Francesco Sforza occupies the Marches and the entire State of Fermo. He remains in Monterubbiano for five months, and forces the citizens of Moresco to supply his troupes with wine, oil, hay, wood and money.
- 1481, the village is subjected to the rivalry between the towns of Ascoli and Fermo. A nobleman from Fermo, Pellegrino Morroni, is killed in the castle of Moresco by people from Monterubbiano.
- 1586, the Pope from the Marches, Sistus 5th, creates the Garrison of Montalto,
- 1648, a garrison of soldiers from Moresco, led by Giovanni Morelli, reaches Fermo to re-establish order after the killing of the Governor.
- 1848, Moresco is an autonomous commune, but in 1869, under the Reign of Italy, it is united with Monterubbiano.
- 1910, on 25 June Moresco wins back its autonomy by royal decree.

== Demographic evolution ==
Historical population

| Year | Pop. | ±% |
|---|---|---|
| 1861 | 829 | — |
| 1871 | 839 | +1.2% |
| 1881 | 878 | +4.6% |
| 1901 | 966 | +10.0% |
| 1911 | 1,103 | +14.2% |

| Year | Pop. | ±% |
|---|---|---|
| 1921 | 1,002 | −9.2% |
| 1931 | 1,051 | +4.9% |
| 1936 | 1,062 | +1.0% |
| 1951 | 1,100 | +3.6% |
| 1961 | 1,025 | −6.8% |

| Year | Pop. | ±% |
|---|---|---|
| 1971 | 746 | −27.2% |
| 1981 | 604 | −19.0% |
| 1991 | 606 | +0.3% |
| 2001 | 608 | +0.3% |

Source: Data from ISTAT
