= List of hilltowns in Central Italy =

This is a list of hilltowns in central Italy.

- Tuscany
  - Anghiari
  - Barga
  - Buonconvento
  - Castelfranco di Sopra
  - Cetona
  - Coreglia Antelminelli
  - Giglio Castello
  - Pitigliano
  - Poppi
  - San Casciano dei Bagni
  - San Gimignano
  - Scarperia
  - Sovana
  - Suvereto
  - Volterra
- Marche
  - Corinaldo
  - Esanatoglia
  - Gradara
  - Montefiore dell'Aso
  - Montelupone
  - Moresco
  - San Ginesio
  - Visso
- Umbria
  - Bevagna
  - Castiglione del Lago
  - Corciano
  - Montefalco
  - Montone
  - Norcia
  - Orvieto
  - Paciano
  - Todi
  - Trevi
  - Vallo di Nera
- Lazio
  - Campodimele
  - Castel di Tora
  - Castel Gandolfo
  - Ceri
  - Civita di Bagnoregio
  - Collalto Sabino
  - Maenza
  - Priverno
  - Roccagorga
  - San Donato Val di Comino
  - Sperlonga

== Sources ==
- Steves, Rick (2015). Hill Towns of Central Italy: Including Siena & Assisi. Rick Steves Snapshot. Avalon Publishing. ISBN 978-1-63121-204-8.
