= Anversa degli Abruzzi =

- Comune
- Comune di Anversa degli Abruzzi
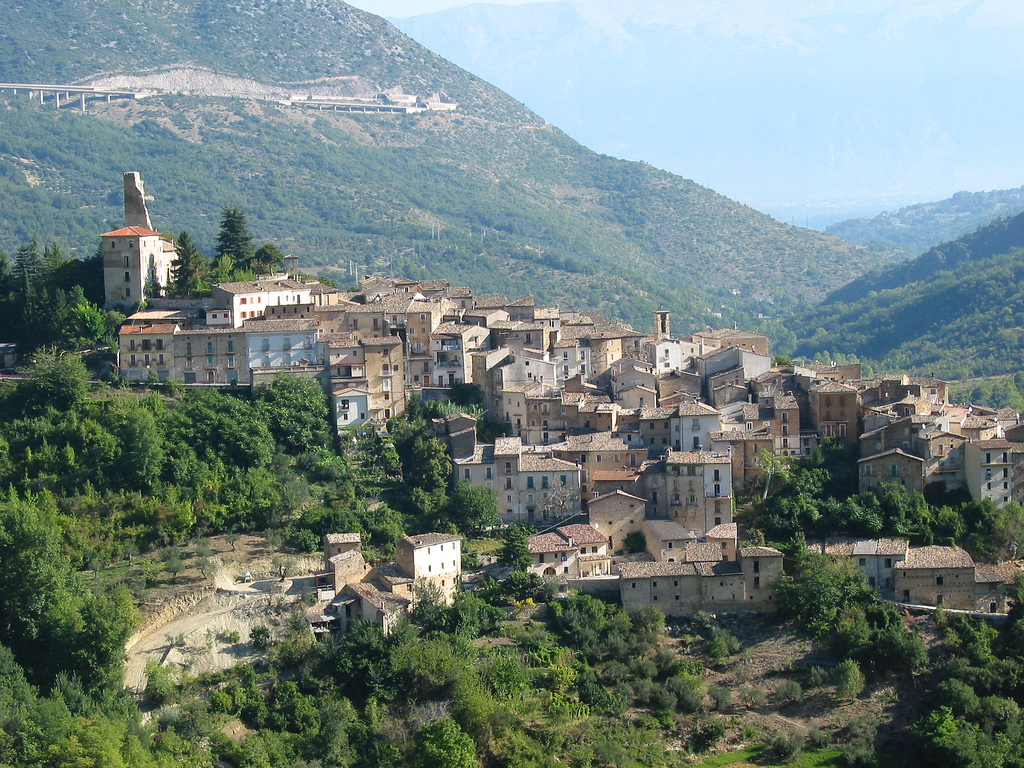
- View of Anversa degli Abruzzi

- Location within Italy Location within Abruzzo
- Coordinates: 41°59′41″N 13°48′17″E
- Country: Italy
- Region: Abruzzo
- Province: L'Aquila (AQ)
- Frazioni: Castrovalva

Government
  - Mayor: Gianni Di Cesare

Area
  - Total: 31.69 km^{2} (12.24 sq mi)
- Elevation: 560 m (1,840 ft)

Population (30 April 2017)
  - Total: 342
  - Density: 10.8/km^{2} (28.0/sq mi)
- Demonym: Anversani
- Time zone: UTC+1 (CET)
  - Summer (DST): UTC+2 (CEST)
- Postal code: 67030
- Dialing code: 0864
- Patron saint: Pope Marcellus I
- Saint day: 16 January
- Website: Official website

Anversa degli Abruzzi (Abruzzese: Anvèrsë) is a comune and town in the province of L'Aquila in the Abruzzo region of southern Italy. It is one of I Borghi più belli d'Italia ("The most beautiful villages of Italy").

== History ==
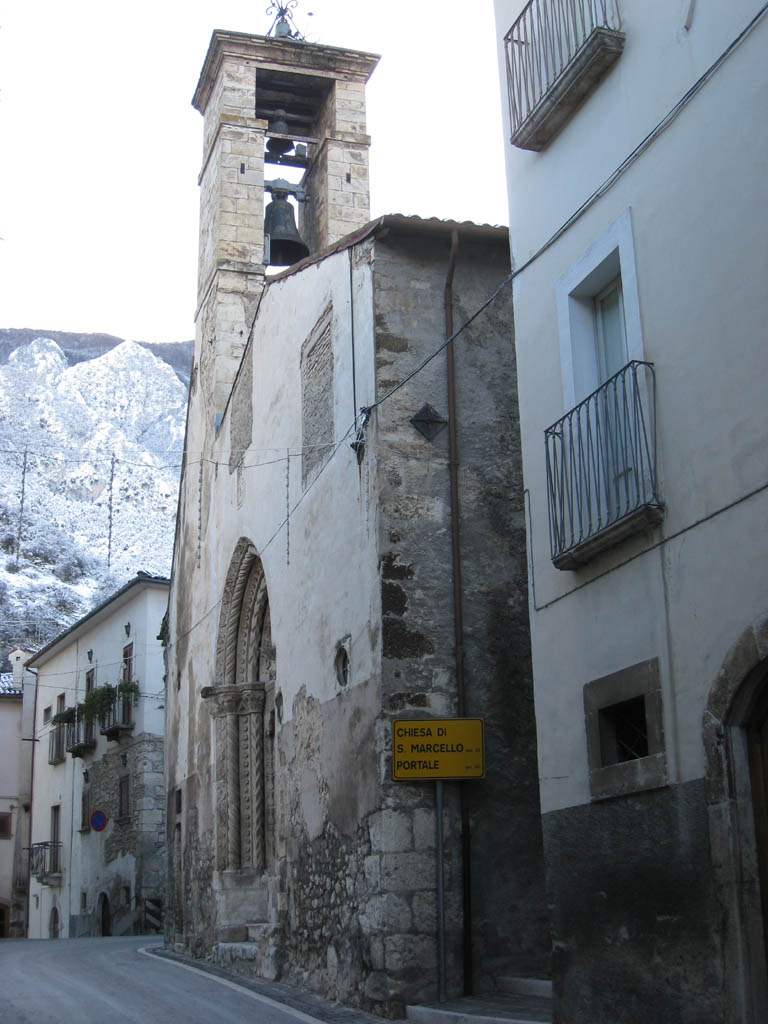
Church of San Marcello

In the surrounding areas between the Cenozoic and Mesozoic there was a carbonate sedimentation (the rocks near contain various carbonates, mainly including calcium carbonate in the form of compact limestone).

In the 20th century the population underwent a significant population decline (especially for places that offer better job opportunities, including Sulmona). The population fell from 1,934 inhabitants in 1901, to the current just over 300 inhabitants.

== Main sights ==
- Giardino Botanico Gole del Sagittario
- Norman Castle
- Church of San Marcello
