= Old Hilltown, California =

Unincorporated community in California, United States

Old Hilltown
- Unincorporated community
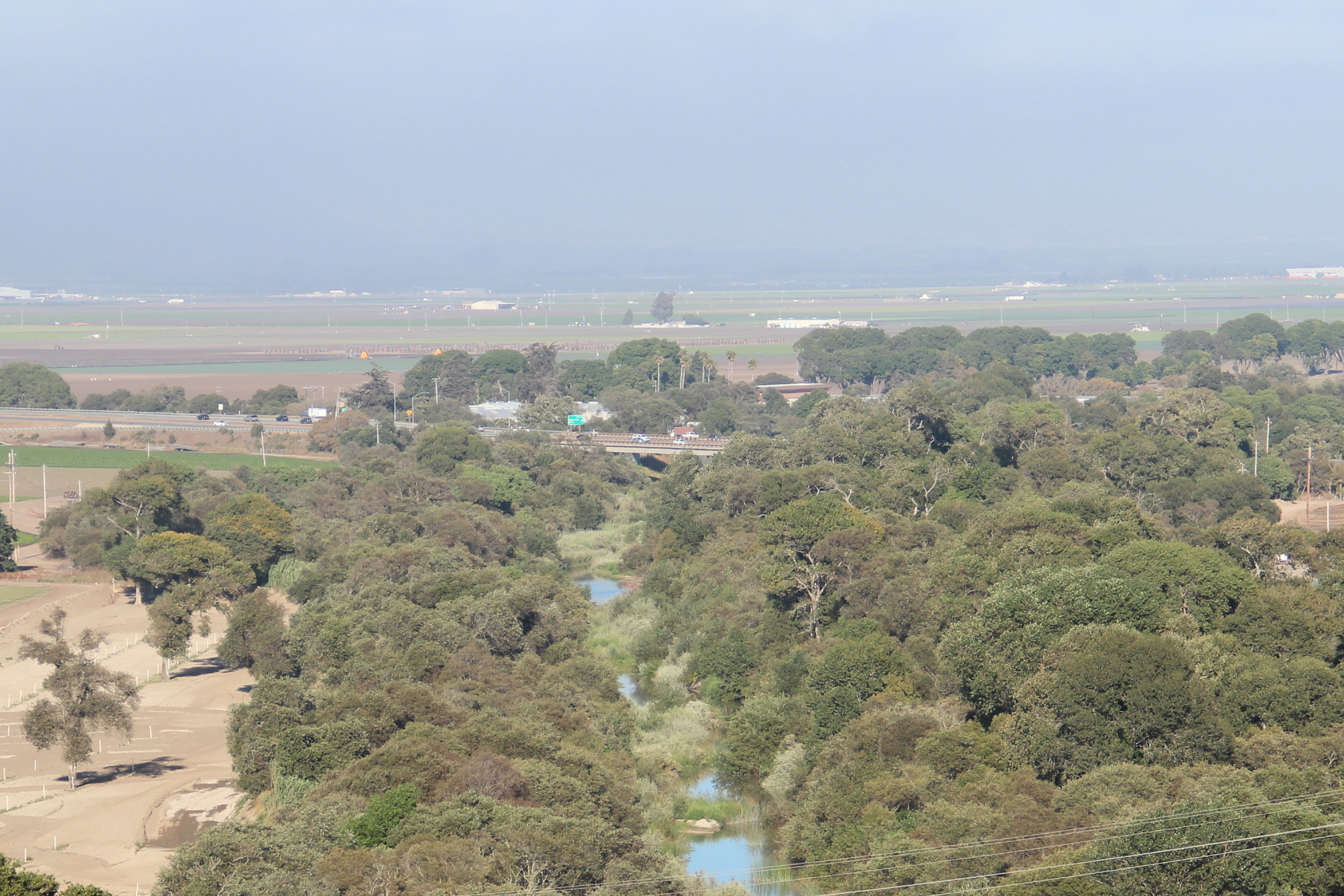
- Old Hilltown viewed from Fort Ord National Monument

- Location in California
- Coordinates: 36°37′53″N 121°40′10″W
- Country: United States
- State: California
- County: Monterey
- Elevation: 46 ft (14 m)

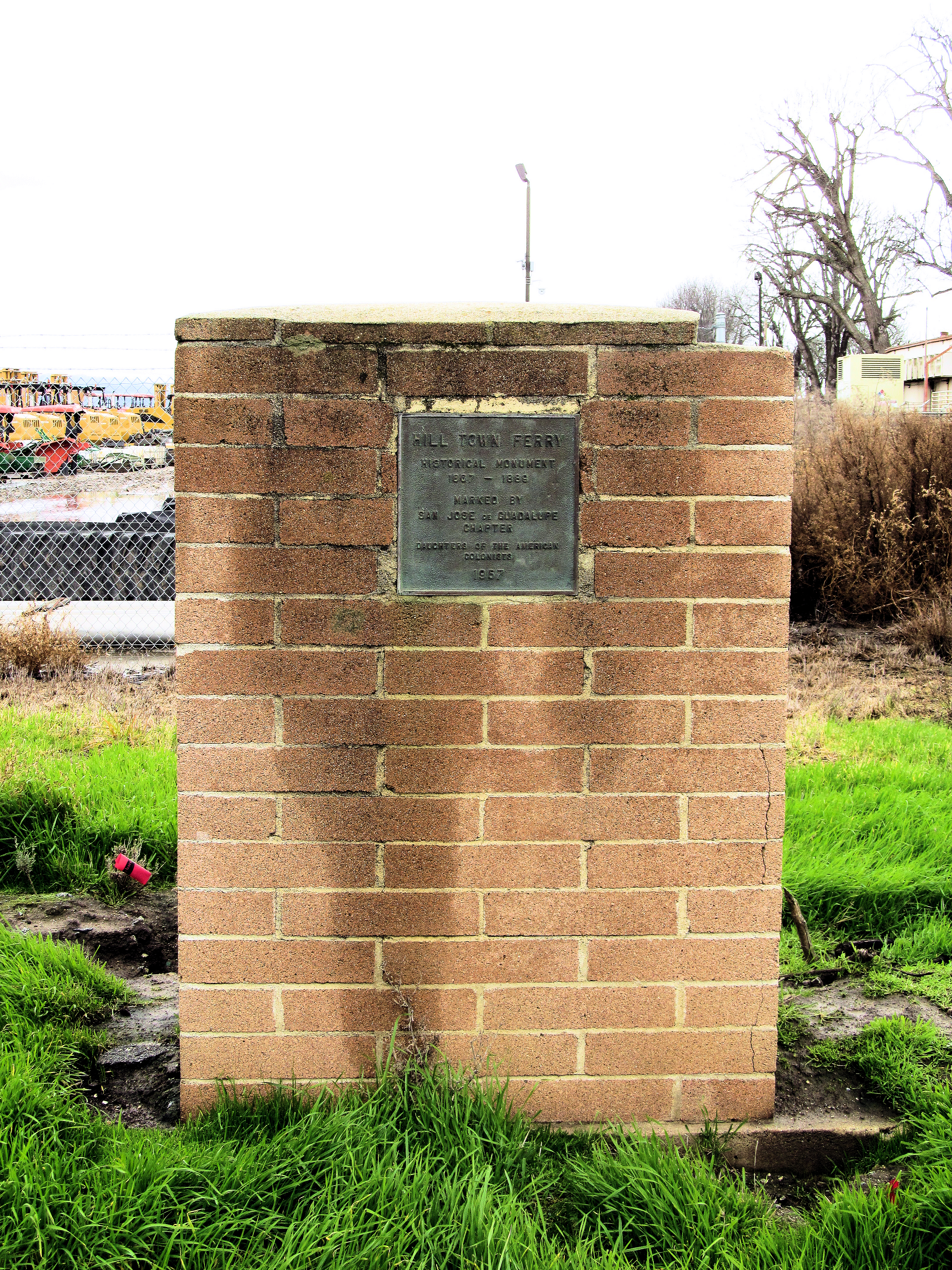
Hill Town Ferry historical monument

Old Hilltown, formerly Hill Town, is an unincorporated community in Monterey County, California, United States. It is located on the north side of the Salinas River, 3 miles (4.8 km) south-southwest of Salinas on California State Route 68, at an elevation of 46 feet (14 m), approximately two miles from Spreckels. The name is from James Bryant Hill, one of the first settlers in the area. The first European land exploration of Alta California, the Spanish Portolá expedition, camped on the Salinas River in this vicinity on September 30, 1769, having followed the river from the south for several days. From this camp, the scouts went out to survey the route ahead and saw Monterey Bay for the first time. Unsure whether the point they could see at the southern end of the bay was the "Point of Pines" described by Sebastian Vizcaino in 1602, Portola decided that the party should investigate.

Hill Town was established at a ford of the Salinas River called Paso del Quinto. Hill Town was the site of one of the first ferries on the Salinas River. The ferry operated until 1889 when a bridge was built across the river. The site is now registered as California Historical Landmark #560.

== Government ==
At the county level, Old Hilltown is represented on the Monterey County Board of Supervisors by Supervisor Dave Potter.

In the California State Senate, Old Hilltown is split between the 19th senatorial district, represented by Republican Rosilicie Ochoa Bogh, and the 20th senatorial district, represented by Democrat Caroline Menjivar. In the California State Assembly, it is split between the 29th Assembly district, represented by Democrat Robert Rivas, and the 30th Assembly district, represented by Democrat Dawn Addis.

In the United States House of Representatives, Hilltown is in California's 20th congressional district, represented by Republican Vince Fong.
