= List of hilltowns in Northern Italy =

Hilltowns in Northern Italy

- Aosta Valley
  - Antagnod
  - Bard
- Piedmont
  - Mombaldone
  - Neive
  - Orta San Giulio
  - Ricetto di Candelo
  - Vogogna
  - Volpedo
- Liguria
  - Ameglia
  - Apricale
  - Arcola
  - Castelnuvo Magra
  - Castelvecchio
  - Cervo
  - Cornice
  - Corniglia
  - Millesimo
  - Nicola
  - Ortonovo
  - Pigna
  - Trebbiano
  - Triora
  - Vezzano Ligure
- Lombardia
  - Bienno
  - Castellaro Lagusello
  - Cornello dei Tasso
  - Fortunago
  - Gradella
  - Lovere
  - Monte Isola
  - Oramala
  - Zavattarello
- Trentino-Alto Adige/Südtirol
  - Rango
- Veneto
  - Arquà Petrarca
  - Asolo
  - Borghetto
  - Portobuffolé
- Friuli-Venezia Giulia
  - Clauiano
  - Cordovado
  - Fagagna
  - Gradisca d'Isonzo
  - Poffabro
- Emilia-Romagna
  - Brisighella
  - Castell'Arquato
  - Compiano
  - Dozza
  - Montefiore Conca
  - Montegridolfo
  - Vigoleno
