= 2017 Saint-Laurent federal by-election =

← 2015	April 3, 2017	2019 →

Seat of Saint-Laurent
- Registered: 69,302
- Turnout: 28.33% (▼30.65pp)
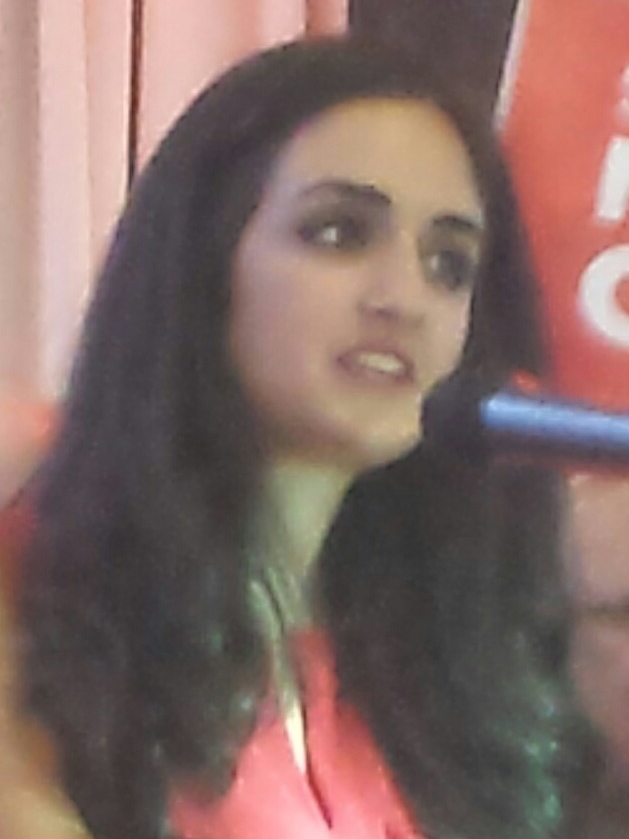

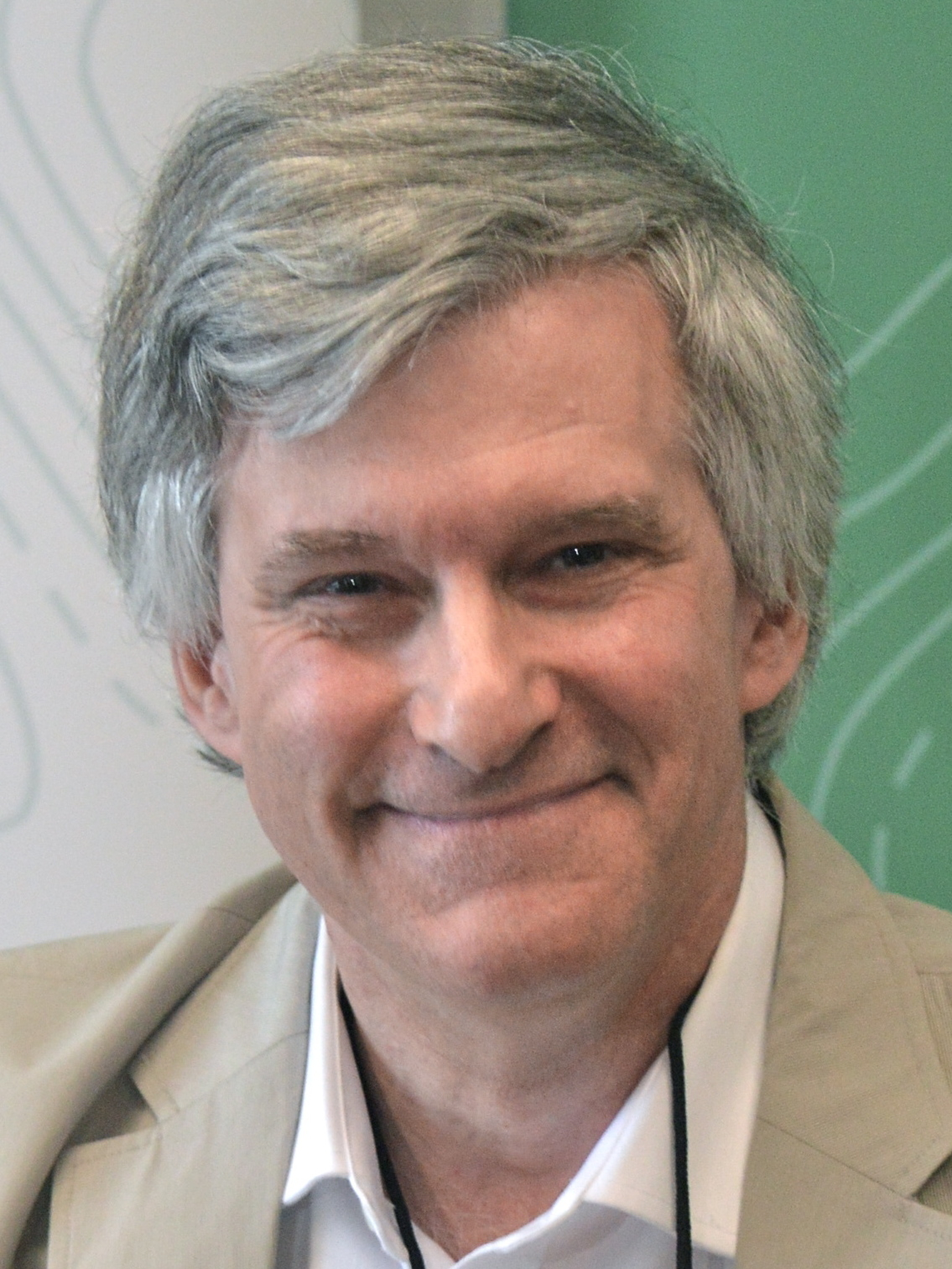
	First party	Second party
		CPC
Candidate	Emmanuella Lambropoulos	Jimmy Yu
Party	Liberal	Conservative
Popular vote	11,461	3,784
Percentage	59.13%	19.52%
Swing	▼2.44pp	▲0.01pp
	Third party	Fourth party
		NDP
Candidate	Daniel Green	Mathieu Auclair
Party	Green	New Democratic
Popular vote	1,548	1,511
Percentage	7.99%	7.80%
Swing	▲5.57pp	▼3.72pp
MP before election
Stéphane Dion
Liberal
Elected MP
Emmanuella Lambropoulos
Liberal

A by-election was held in the federal riding of Saint-Laurent in Quebec, Canada on 3 April 2017 following the resignation of Liberal MP and Minister of Foreign Affairs Stéphane Dion, who was appointed to a diplomatic post. The seat was held by the Liberal candidate Emmanuella Lambropoulos on a reduced majority.

The by-election was scheduled to coincide with four others across the country; Calgary Heritage, Calgary Midnapore, Markham—Thornhill and Ottawa—Vanier.

== Background ==
=== Constituency ===
The district corresponds exactly to the borough of Saint-Laurent in the city of Montreal.

=== Representation ===
The riding (previously called Saint-Laurent—Cartierville) has been represented by Stéphane Dion since 1996, and has been held by the Liberals since its creation in 1988. It has long been regarded as one of the safest Liberal ridings in the nation.

== Campaign ==
The riding of Saint-Laurent was vacated on February 6, 2017, following the appointment of Liberal MP and former Minister of Foreign Affairs Stéphane Dion as Canada's Ambassador to the European Union and Germany.

The by-election, held on April 3, 2017, was announced on February 22, 2017. The Speaker's warrant regarding the vacancy was received on February 8, 2017; under the Parliament of Canada Act the writ for the by-election had to be issued no earlier than February 19, 2017, and no later than August 7, 2017. The election date must be set to be a Monday at least 36 days after the writ is issued.

== Candidates ==
Candidates for the Liberal nomination included former Nelligan MNA and provincial cabinet minister Yolande James, and tax law professor Marwah Rizqy, the 2015 Liberal candidate in Hochelaga. Saint-Laurent Borough Mayor and Montreal City Councillor Alan DeSousa intended to run for the nomination but was rejected by the party's nomination committee. In what was seen as a surprising result, both James and Rizqy were defeated for the Liberal nomination by local educator Emmanuella Lambropoulos.

Jimmy Yu, a Conservative Party national councillor, was named the Conservative candidate on March 8. Yu previously ran for the party in the same riding in 2015. Conservative leadership candidate and venture capitalist Rick Peterson had expressed interest in running for the nomination, but declined on March 7.

Mathieu Auclair was named the New Democratic Party's candidate.

William Fayad was named the Bloc Québécois candidate.

Deputy Leader Daniel Green was named the Green Party candidate.

== Results ==
Canadian federal by-election, April 3, 2017: Saint-Laurent Resignation of Stéphane Dion
Party	Candidate	Votes	%	±%
Liberal	Emmanuella Lambropoulos	11,461	59.13	−2.44
Conservative	Jimmy Yu	3,784	19.52	+0.01
Green	Daniel Green	1,548	7.99	+5.57
New Democratic	Mathieu Auclair	1,511	7.80	−3.72
Bloc Québécois	William Fayad	951	4.91	+0.25
Rhinoceros	Chinook Blais-Leduc	129	0.67	–
Total valid votes/expense limit		19,384	100.0	–
Total rejected ballots		255	1.30	+0.30
Turnout		19,639	28.33	−30.65
Eligible voters		69,302		
Liberal hold		Swing		−1.24
Source: lop.parl.ca

== 2015 results ==
2015 Canadian federal election: Saint-Laurent
Party	Candidate	Votes	%	±%	Expenditures
Liberal	Stéphane Dion	24,832	61.57	+18.71	$80,361.33
Conservative	Jimmy Yu	7,867	19.51	+0.4	$126,201.23
New Democratic	Alain Ackad	4,646	11.52	-17.55	$12,858.35
Bloc Québécois	Pascal-Olivier Dumas-Dubreuil	1,879	4.66	-1.77	$11,919.73
Green	John Tromp	977	2.42	+0.33	$1,965.89
Marxist–Leninist	Fernand Deschamps	129	0.32	–	-
Total valid votes/		40,330	100.0		$202,992.54
Total rejected ballots		409	0.59	–	
Turnout		40,739	58.98	–	
Eligible voters		69,078			
Source: Elections Canada
