= 2019 Outremont federal by-election =

| ← 2015 | February 25, 2019 | Oct. 2019 → |

Riding of Outremont
- Turnout: 21.57% (▼40.35pp)
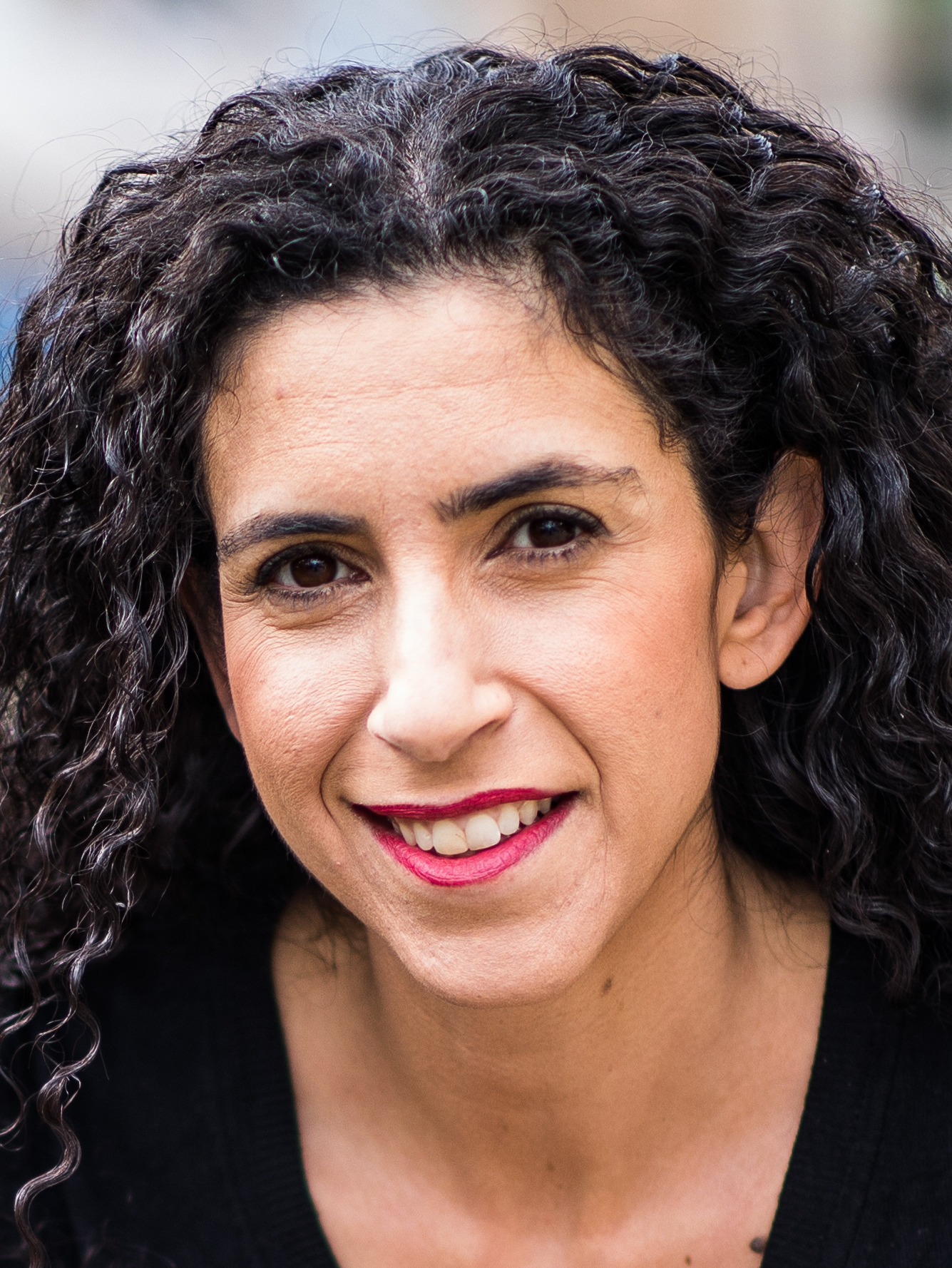

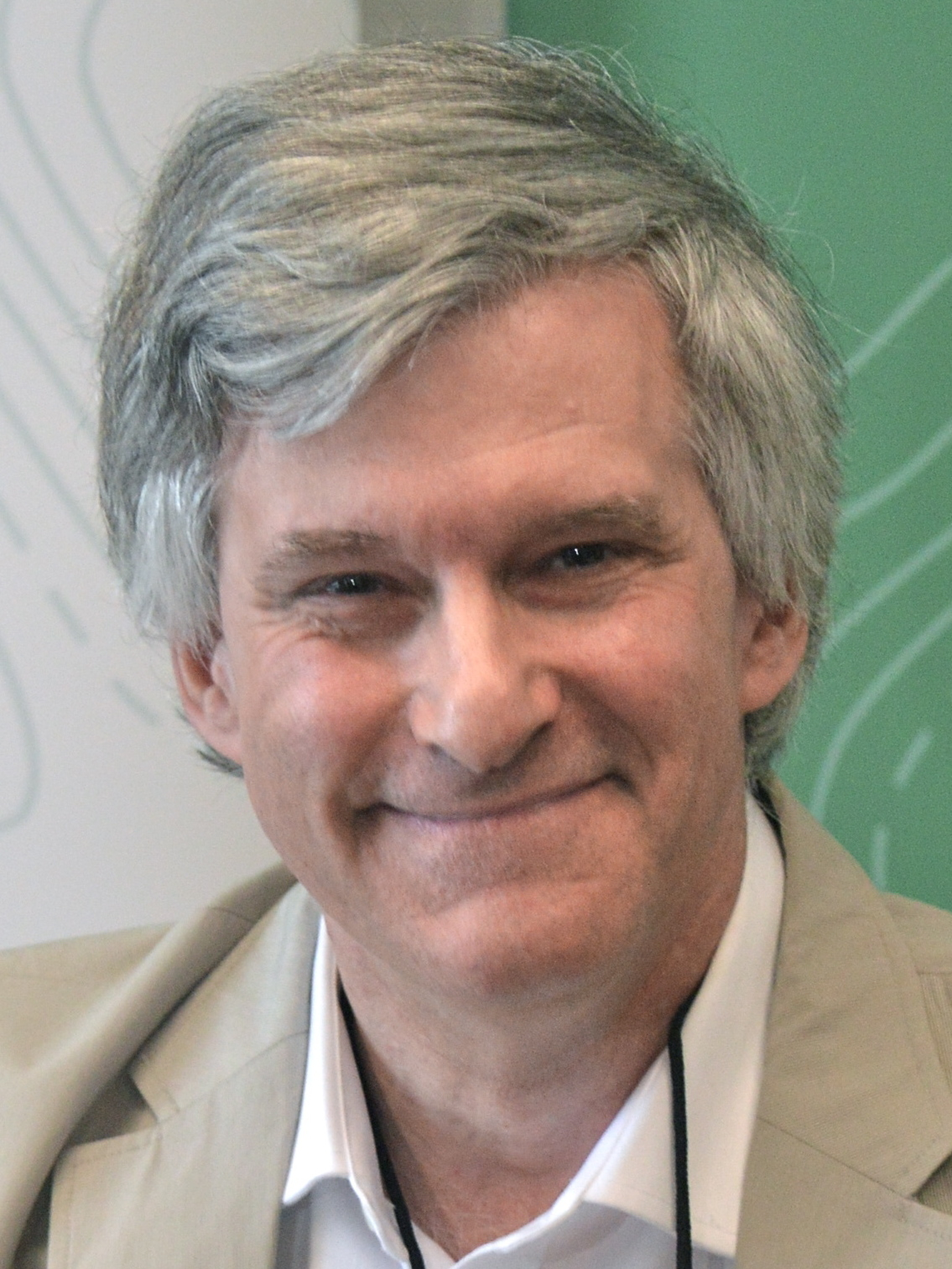

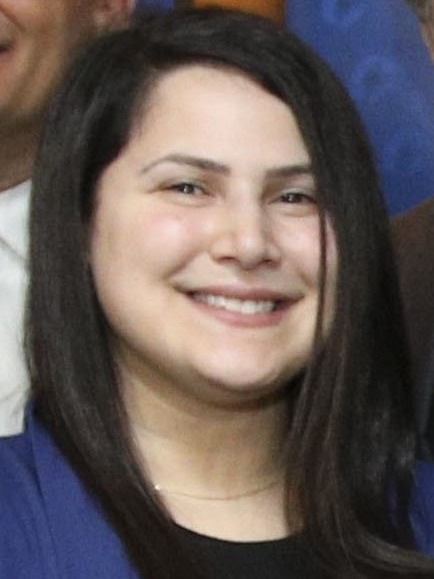
| | First party | Second party | Third party |
|---|---|---|---|
| | | NDP |
| Candidate | Rachel Bendayan | Julia Sánchez | Daniel Green |
| Party | Liberal | New Democratic | Green |
| Popular vote | 6,086 | 4,142 | 1,946 |
| Percentage | 40.43% | 27.52% | 12.93% |
| Swing | ▲6.97pp | ▼16.60pp | ▲9.32pp |
| | Fourth party | Fifth party |
| | BQ |
| Candidate | Michel Duchesne | Jasmine Louras |
| Party | Bloc Québécois | Conservative |
| Popular vote | 1,674 | 925 |
| Percentage | 11.12% | 6.14% |
| Swing | ▲2.71pp | ▼3.39pp |
MP before election
Tom Mulcair
New Democratic
Elected MP
Rachel Bendayan
Liberal

A by-election was held in the federal riding of Outremont in Quebec on February 25, 2019 following the resignation of incumbent New Democratic MP Tom Mulcair. After 12 years in Parliament, the former Leader of the Official Opposition announced that he would resign his seat.

The seat was gained by the Liberal Party of Canada, with Rachel Bendayan winning and becoming the new MP.

== Background ==
=== Constituency ===
Outremont in relation to other electoral districts in Montreal and Laval.

Outremont is an urban constituency in Montreal; the second-most populous city in Canada and most populous city in the Canadian province of Quebec.

The district includes the borough of Outremont, the eastern part of Côte-des-Neiges in the borough of Côte-des-Neiges—Notre-Dame-de-Grâce, and the western part of Mile End in the borough of Le Plateau-Mont-Royal, plus bits of upper Downtown Montreal in the borough of Ville-Marie, La Petite-Patrie in the borough of Rosemont–La Petite-Patrie, and Parc Extension in the borough of Villeray–Saint-Michel–Parc-Extension.

In 2011, Western Montreal was a New Democratic Party stronghold but at the 2015 federal election, the Liberals wiped the NDP out in many seats in the Greater Montreal area.

=== Representation ===
Tom Mulcair, the former Leader of the Opposition as Leader of the New Democratic Party had represented the Montreal riding of Outremont since 2007.

Mulcair announced on December 18, 2017, that he would be resigning his seat of Outremont, after the House of Commons rises for its summer break, to accept an appointment at an undisclosed university, later revealed to be the Université de Montréal. Mulcair's resignation took effect on August 3, 2018. Mulcair's resignation came after the rise of internal leadership and ideological differences within the NDP, following the release of the Leap Manifesto. Following these issues, Mulcair announced his intention to resign as party leader once a new leader had been chosen.

== Campaign ==
On July 25, 2018, humanitarian worker Julia Sánchez was effectively declared the NDP's candidate for the Outremont by-election. Mulcair's constituency office manager Graham Carpenter was a rumoured candidate for the nomination, but did not contest it. Carpenter ran unsuccessfully in 2017 to unseat Lionel Perez as the Montreal City Councillor for the borough of Côte-des-Neiges–Notre-Dame-de-Grâce in Darlington district. Federal NDP leader and former Ontario MPP Jagmeet Singh said in the press in April 2018 that "It's not a 'no'" about running in Outremont, he ultimately did not run. Singh later announced his intention to run in Burnaby South.

Lawyer Rachel Bendayan won the Liberal nomination; Bendayan was the party's nominee in Outremont in the 2015 federal election and then worked as chief of staff of the federal Minister of Small Business and Tourism Bardish Chagger. Principal of Concordia University's Simone de Beauvoir Institute Kimberley Manning had declared her intention to seek the Liberal nomination. Former Notre-Dame-de-Grâce MNA and Côte-des-Neiges–Notre-Dame-de-Grâce borough Mayor Russell Copeman and federal Liberal riding president David Marshall were rumoured candidates for the nomination. Former MP Martin Cauchon, who represented Outremont from 1993 to 2004 and sought the Liberal leadership in 2013, declined to seek the nomination.

Lawyer Jasmine Louras was named the Conservative candidate on August 6.

Deputy Leader Daniel Green is the Green Party candidate. Green previously ran in the Saint-Laurent April 3, 2017 by-election.

Laurent Aglat was announced as the candidate of the Rhinoceros Party, but he did not register.

Michel Duchesne was named the candidate of the Bloc Québécois on January 24.

James Seale was named the People's Party candidate on January 27, 2019.

The Speaker's warrant regarding the vacancy was received on August 3, 2018; under the Parliament of Canada Act the writ for a by-election had to be dropped no later than January 30, 2019, 180 days after the Chief Electoral Officer was officially notified of the vacancy via a warrant issued by the Speaker. The by-election was called on January 9, 2019 to be held on February 25, 2019.

== Results ==
Canadian federal by-election, February 25, 2019: Outremont Resignation of Tom Mulcair
| Party | Candidate | Votes | % | ±% |
|---|---|---|---|---|
| Liberal | Rachel Bendayan | 6,086 | 40.4 | ▲6.94 |
| New Democratic | Julia Sánchez | 4,142 | 27.5 | ▼18.01 |
| Green | Daniel Green | 1,946 | 12.9 | ▲8.89 |
| Bloc Québécois | Michel Duchesne | 1,674 | 11.1 | ▲2.79 |
| Conservative | Jasmine Louras | 925 | 6.1 | ▼2.23 |
| People's | James Seale | 232 | 1.5 | New |
| Independent | William Barrett | 48 | 0.3 | New |
| Total valid votes | | 15,053 | 100.00 | |
| Total rejected ballots | | 135 | 0.90 | |
| Turnout | | 15,188 | 21.57 | |
| Eligible voters | | 70,414 | | |
| Liberal gain from New Democratic | | Swing | | |
Source: Elections Canada

== 2015 result ==
2015 Canadian federal election
| Party | Candidate | Votes | % | ±% | Expenditures |
|---|---|---|---|---|---|
| New Democratic | Tom Mulcair | 19,242 | 44.11 | −11.57 | $101,332.88 |
| Liberal | Rachel Bendayan | 14,597 | 33.46 | +11.84 | $101,506.39 |
| Conservative | Rodolphe Husny | 4,159 | 9.53 | +1.55 | $7,828.89 |
| Bloc Québécois | Roger Galland Barou | 3,668 | 8.41 | −3.20 | $6,959.30 |
| Green | Amara Diallo | 1,575 | 3.61 | +1.37 | – |
| Libertarian | Francis Pouliot | 216 | 0.50 | – | – |
| Communist | Adrien Welsh | 162 | 0.37 | – | – |
| Total valid votes/Expense limit | | 43,619 | 100.00 | – | $204,392.07 |
| Total rejected ballots | | 426 | 0.97 | – | – |
| Turnout | | 44,045 | 62.42 | – | – |
| Eligible voters | | 70,559 | – | – | – |
Source: Elections Canada
