= Maurice Lamontagne =

Canadian politician (1917–1983)

The Honourable Maurice Lamontagne PC FRSC FRSA

Secretary of State for Canada
- In office February 3, 1964 – December 17, 1965
- Prime Minister: Lester B. Pearson
- Preceded by: Jack Pickersgill
- Succeeded by: Judy LaMarsh

President of the Privy Council
- In office April 22, 1963 – February 2, 1964
- Prime Minister: Lester B. Pearson
- Preceded by: John Diefenbaker
- Succeeded by: George McIlraith

Senator for Inkerman, Quebec
- In office April 6, 1967 – June 12, 1983
- Appointed by: Lester B. Pearson
- Preceded by: Adrian Knatchbull-Hugessen
- Succeeded by: Charlie Watt

Member of Parliament for Outremont—St-Jean
- In office April 8, 1963 – April 5, 1967
- Preceded by: Romuald Bourque
- Succeeded by: Aurélien Noël

Personal details
- Born: September 7, 1917 Mont-Joli, Quebec, Canada
- Died: June 12, 1983 (aged 65) Ottawa, Ontario, Canada
- Party: Liberal
- Spouse: Jeannette Morin (m. 1943)
- Children: 3
- Education: Université Laval; Harvard University
- Profession: Economist; professor

Maurice Lamontagne PC FRSC FRSA (September 7, 1917 – June 12, 1983) was a Canadian economist and politician.

Born in Mont-Joli, Quebec, he graduated from Université Laval with a master's degree in social science and Harvard University with a master's in economics. He was a professor of economics at Université Laval. In 1954, he became an assistant deputy minister in the Department of Northern Affairs and National Resources headed by Jean Lesage. In 1957, he joined the faculty of the University of Ottawa as a professor of economics. From 1958 to 1963, he served as an adviser to Lester B. Pearson.

In 1958, he ran unsuccessfully as the Liberal candidate for the House of Commons of Canada in the riding of Quebec East. He was defeated again in 1962. He was elected in 1963 in the riding of Outremont—St-Jean and re-elected in 1965. From 1963 to 1964, he was the President of the Privy Council. From 1964 to 1965, he was the Secretary of State of Canada.

He was a member of the Club of Rome.

In 1967, he was called to the Senate of Canada representing the senatorial division of Inkerman, Quebec. He served until his death in 1983.

The Maurice Lamontagne Institute is named in his honour.

There is a Maurice Lamontagne fonds at Library and Archives Canada.
