= Outremont (electoral district) =

Federal electoral district in Quebec, Canada

Coordinates: 45°30′30″N 73°36′30″W

Quebec electoral district
- Interactive map of riding boundaries from the 2025 federal election

Federal electoral district
- Legislature: House of Commons
MP
Rachel Bendayan
Liberal
- District created: 1933
- First contested: 1935
- Last contested: 2025
- District webpage: profile, map

Demographics
- Population (2016): 102,088
- Electors (2019): 67,842
- Area (km²): 11.95
- Pop. density (per km²): 8,542.9
- Census division: Montreal
- Census subdivision: Montreal (part)

Outremont (French pronunciation: [utʁəmɔ̃]) is a federal electoral district in Montreal, Quebec, Canada, that has been represented in the House of Commons of Canada since 1935. It was known as Outremont—Saint-Jean from 1949 to 1968. Its population in 2016 was 102,088. Its current Member of Parliament is Rachel Bendayan of the Liberal Party of Canada.

== Demographics ==
According to the 2011 Canadian census

Ethnic groups: 69.5% White, 6.9% Black, 6.7% Arab, 3.8% Latino, 2.8% Filipino, 2.4% South Asian, 2.1% Southeast Asian, 2.0% Chinese, 1.7% Indigenous, 2.1% Other
Languages: 47.9% French, 16.5% English, 5.4% Arabic, 4.8% Yiddish, 4.6% Spanish, 1.9% Portuguese, 1.8% Greek, 1.5% Romanian, 1.4% Tagalog, 1.3% Russian, 12.9% Other
Religions: 50.7% Christian, 11.0% Jewish, 9.5% Muslim, 1.3% Buddhist, 1.2% Hindu, 0.3% Other, 26.0% None
Median income: $22,551 (2010)
Average income: $39,486 (2010)

According to the 2016 Canadian census

- Languages: (2016) 54.9% French, 23.5% English, 4.9% Yiddish, 2.7% Spanish, 2.4% Arabic, 1.5% Farsi, 1.1% Portuguese, 0.9% Greek, 0.9% Romanian, 0.8% Tagalog, 0.8% Russian, 0.8% Mandarin, 0.6% Vietnamese

== Geography ==
The district includes the borough of Outremont, the eastern part of Côte-des-Neiges in the borough of Côte-des-Neiges—Notre-Dame-de-Grâce, and the western part of Mile End in the borough of Le Plateau-Mont-Royal, plus bits of upper Downtown Montreal in the borough of Ville-Marie, La Petite-Patrie in the borough of Rosemont–La Petite-Patrie, and Parc Extension in the borough of Villeray–Saint-Michel–Parc-Extension.

== Political geography ==
In the 2006 election, the Liberals had their strongest support in Côte-des-Neiges, on the eastern slopes of Mont-Royal and in the small part of the riding in the Parc-Extension neighbourhood. The Bloc had its support concentrated in the borough of Outremont, and around the Université de Montréal. The New Democratic Party (NDP) won all of its polls in Mile-End. The Conservatives won just three polls in the riding all of which were around the western part of the Outremont border.

In the 2007 by-election, the NDP almost swept the riding. Their strongest areas were in Mile-End, Jeanne-Mance, and around the Université de Montréal. It was not uncommon for the NDP to win more than 70% of the vote in these polls. The Bloc Québécois vote had collapsed, most of which went to the NDP. They did not win a single poll. Liberal support was relegated to the small part of Parc-Extension in the riding, the area around Rue Jean-Talon and the area on the opposite side of Mount Royal along Avenue des Pins. The Conservatives held on to one of their three polls.

In the 2008 election, the NDP held on to Outremont, albeit with a lower percentage of overall support.

Until the 2011 election, this riding was the only riding in Quebec to be held by the NDP. Mulcair held it since winning a by-election in 2007, earning a Quebec seat for the party for only the second time in history. He was challenged in 2011 by Liberal Martin Cauchon, who held this riding from 1993 to 2004 and was a former cabinet minister.

== History ==
The electoral district was created in 1933 from parts of Laurier—Outremont and Mount Royal ridings.

This riding lost territory to Papineau, Notre-Dame-de-Grâce—Westmount, Laurier—Sainte-Marie, Ville-Marie—Le Sud-Ouest—Île-des-Sœurs and Rosemont—La Petite-Patrie, and gained territory from Laurier—Sainte-Marie, Westmount—Ville-Marie and Mount Royal during the 2012 electoral redistribution.

Following the 2022 Canadian federal electoral redistribution, the riding gained the territory south of Av. Christophe-Colombe and west of Rue Rachel from Laurier—Sainte-Marie.

=== 2007 by-election ===
After the resignation of Jean Lapierre on 28 January 2007, a by-election was called for 17 September 2007. In the by-election, this riding was won by the NDP candidate Thomas Mulcair.

Mulcair retained the riding for the NDP in the 2008 federal election, marking the NDP's first re-election and first general election victory in Quebec.

=== Former boundaries ===
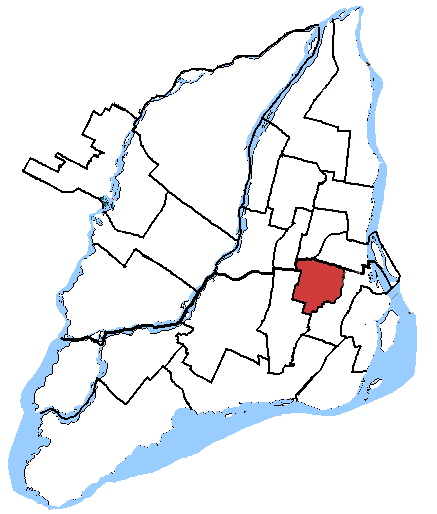
2004 to 2011 election

=== Members of Parliament ===
This riding has elected the following members of Parliament:

Parliament	Years	Member	Party
Outremont; Riding created from Laurier—Outremont, Mount Royal and Saint-Denis
18th	1935–1940	Thomas Vien	Liberal
19th	1940–1942	Thomas Vien	Liberal
19th	1942–1945	Léo Richer Laflèche	Liberal
20th	1945–1949	Édouard Rinfret	Liberal
Outremont—Saint-Jean
21st	1949–1952	Édouard Rinfret	Liberal
21st	1952–1953	Romuald Bourque	Liberal
22nd	1953–1957	Romuald Bourque	Liberal
23rd	1957–1958	Romuald Bourque	Liberal
24th	1958–1962	Romuald Bourque	Liberal
25th	1962–1963	Romuald Bourque	Liberal
26th	1963–1965	Maurice Lamontagne	Liberal
27th	1965–1967	Maurice Lamontagne	Liberal
27th	1967–1968	Aurélien Noël	Liberal
Outremont
28th	1968–1972	Aurélien Noël	Liberal
29th	1972–1974	Marc Lalonde	Liberal
30th	1974–1979	Marc Lalonde	Liberal
31st	1979–1980	Marc Lalonde	Liberal
32nd	1980–1984	Marc Lalonde	Liberal
33rd	1984–1988	Lucie Pépin	Liberal
34th	1988–1993	Jean-Pierre Hogue	Progressive Conservative
35th	1993–1997	Martin Cauchon	Liberal
36th	1997–2000	Martin Cauchon	Liberal
37th	2000–2004	Martin Cauchon	Liberal
38th	2004–2006	Jean Lapierre	Liberal
39th	2006–2007	Jean Lapierre	Liberal
39th	2007–2008	Tom Mulcair	New Democratic
40th	2008–2011	Tom Mulcair	New Democratic
41st	2011–2015	Tom Mulcair	New Democratic
42nd	2015–2018	Tom Mulcair	New Democratic
42nd	2019–2019	Rachel Bendayan	Liberal
43rd	2019–2021	Rachel Bendayan	Liberal
44th	2021–2025	Rachel Bendayan	Liberal
45th	2025–present	Rachel Bendayan	Liberal

== Election results ==
Graph of election results in Outremont 1935-present (minor parties that never got 2% of the vote or didn't run consistently are omitted) View source data.

=== Outremont, 1968–present ===
2025 Canadian federal election
Party	Candidate	Votes	%	±%	Expenditures
Liberal	Rachel Bendayan	26,024	55.20	+10.84	$98,796.10
Conservative	Ronan Reich	5,911	12.54	+5.23	$24,711.42
Bloc Québécois	Rémi Lebeuf	5,644	11.97	−3.47	$3,085.53
New Democratic	Ève Péclet	5,024	10.66	−16.64	$29,001.06
Green	Jonathan Pedneault	4,539	9.63	+6.51	$76,595.41
Total valid votes		47,142	98.73	–0.08	$125,931.56
Total rejected ballots		606	1.27	+0.08	
Turnout		47,748	62.34	+5.46	
Eligible voters		76,592			
Liberal notional hold		Swing		+2.81	
Source: Elections Canada

2021 federal election redistributed results
Party	Vote	%
Liberal	18,229	44.36
New Democratic	11,218	27.30
Bloc Québécois	6,346	15.44
Conservative	3,005	7.31
Green	1,283	3.12
People's	877	2.13
Independent	98	0.24
Animal Protection	18	0.04
Free	9	0.02
Communist	8	0.02
Marxist-Leninist	3	0.01
Total valid votes	41,094	99.33
Rejected ballots	493	0.67
Registered voters/ estimated turnout	73,112	56.88

2021 Canadian federal election: Outremont
Party	Candidate	Votes	%	±%	Expenditures
Liberal	Rachel Bendayan	16,714	45.39	-0.80	$74,361.58
New Democratic	Ève Péclet	9,579	26.02	+5.95	$25,871.29
Bloc Québécois	Célia Grimard	5,535	15.03	+1.18	$10,443.22
Conservative	Jasmine Louras	2,882	7.83	+1.30	none listed
Green	Grace Tarabey	1,198	3.25	-8.58	$1,719.40
People's	Yehuda Pinto	819	2.22	+1.33	1,871.20
Independent	Angela-Angie Joshi	93	0.25	N/A	$3,516.54
Total valid votes/expense limit		36,820	98.8	–	$104,612.20
Total rejected ballots		456	1.2		
Turnout		37,276	57.2	-5.0	
Eligible voters		65,143			
Liberal hold		Swing		-3.38	
Source: Elections Canada

2019 Canadian federal election
Party	Candidate	Votes	%	±%	Expenditures
Liberal	Rachel Bendayan	19,148	46.19	+5.76	$47,498.81
New Democratic	Andrea Clarke	8,319	20.07	-7.45	none listed
Bloc Québécois	Célia Grimard	5,741	13.85	+2.63	$9,862.60
Green	Daniel Green	5,018	12.1	-0.83	none listed
Conservative	Jasmine Louras	2,707	6.53	+0.39	$4,912.03
People's	Sabin Levesque	369	0.89	-0.65	none listed
Rhinoceros	Mark John Hiemstra	155	0.37		none listed
Total valid votes/expense limit		41,457	100.0	$102,446.50	
Total rejected ballots		455			
Turnout		41,912	62.2		
Eligible voters		67,842			
Liberal hold		Swing		+6.61	
Source: Elections Canada

Canadian federal by-election, February 25, 2019 Resignation of Tom Mulcair
Party	Candidate	Votes	%	±%
Liberal	Rachel Bendayan	6,086	40.43	+6.97
New Democratic	Julia Sánchez	4,142	27.52	-16.60
Green	Daniel Green	1,946	12.93	+9.32
Bloc Québécois	Michel Duchesne	1,674	11.12	+2.71
Conservative	Jasmine Louras	925	6.14	-3.39
People's	James Seale	232	1.54	-
Independent	William Barrett	48	0.32	-
Total valid votes		15,053	99.11	
Total rejected ballots		135	0.89	-0.08
Turnout		15,188	21.57	-40.35
Eligible voters		70,414		
Liberal gain from New Democratic		Swing		+11.78
Source: Elections Canada

2015 Canadian federal election
Party	Candidate	Votes	%	±%	Expenditures
New Democratic	Tom Mulcair	19,242	44.11	−11.57	$101,332.88
Liberal	Rachel Bendayan	14,597	33.46	+11.84	$101,506.39
Conservative	Rodolphe Husny	4,159	9.53	+1.55	$7,828.89
Bloc Québécois	Roger Galland Barou	3,668	8.41	−3.20	$6,959.30
Green	Amara Diallo	1,575	3.61	+1.37	–
Libertarian	Francis Pouliot	216	0.50	–	–
Communist	Adrien Welsh	162	0.37	–	–
Total valid votes/Expense limit		43,619	100.00	–	$204,392.07
Total rejected ballots		426	0.97	–	–
Turnout		44,045	62.42	–	–
Eligible voters		70,559	–	–	–
Source: Elections Canada

2011 federal election redistributed results
Party	Vote	%
New Democratic	23,317	55.68
Liberal	9,055	21.62
Bloc Québécois	4,860	11.61
Conservative	3,343	7.98
Green	937	2.24
Others	362	0.86

2011 Canadian federal election
Party	Candidate	Votes	%	±%	Expenditures
New Democratic	Tom Mulcair	21,906	56.37	+16.84	$80,457
Liberal	Martin Cauchon	9,204	23.69	−9.39	$51,130
Conservative	Rodolphe Husny	3,408	8.77	−1.76	$18,319
Bloc Québécois	Élise Daoust	3,199	8.23	−4.32	$10,456
Green	François Pilon	838	2.16	−2.15	$4,578
Rhinoceros	Tommy Gaudet	160	0.41	–	
Communist	Johan Boyden	143	0.37	–	
Total valid votes		38,858	100.00		
Total rejected ballots		291	0.74	+0.05	
Turnout		39,149	60.46	+4.35	
Electors on the lists		65,573			
Source: Official Voting Results, 41st General Election 2011, Elections Canada

2008 Canadian federal election
Party	Candidate	Votes	%	±%	Expenditures
New Democratic	Tom Mulcair	14,348	39.53	−7.97	$69,072
Liberal	Sébastien Dhavernas	12,005	33.08	+4.12	$45,118
Bloc Québécois	Marcela Valdivia	4,554	12.55	+1.62	$48,279
Conservative	Lulzim Laloshi	3,820	10.53	+1.96	$25,770
Green	François Pilon	1,566	4.31	+2.10	not listed
Total valid votes		36,293	100.00		
Total rejected ballots		253	0.69		
Turnout		36,546	56.11	+18.68	
Electors on the lists		64,556			
New Democratic hold		Swing		−6.05	
Source: Official Voting Results, 40th General Election 2008, Elections Canada. Percentage change totals are in relation to a 2007 by-election, not to the previous general election.

Canadian federal by-election, September 17, 2007 Resignation of Jean Lapierre
Party	Candidate	Votes	%	±%	Expenditures
New Democratic	Thomas Mulcair	11,374	47.50	+30.03	$76,194
Liberal	Jocelyn Coulon	6,933	28.96	−6.22	$72,539
Bloc Québécois	Jean-Paul Gilson	2,618	10.93	−18.08	$57,717
Conservative	Gilles Duguay	2,052	8.57	−4.16	$66,401
Green	François Pilon	529	2.21	−2.61	$169
neorhino.ca	François Yo Gourd	145	0.61	–	$1,774
Independent	Mahmood Raza Baig	78	0.33	–	$45
Independent	Jocelyne Leduc	61	0.25	–	$6
Independent	Romain Angeles	46	0.19	–	$157
Canadian Action	Alexandre Amirizian	45	0.19	–	$0
Independent	Régent Millette	32	0.13	+0.08	none listed
Independent	John Turmel	30	0.13	–	none listed
Total valid votes		23,943	100.00		
Total rejected ballots		175	0.73	+0.03	
Turnout		24,118	37.43	−23.35	
Electors on the lists		64,438			
New Democratic gain from Liberal		Swing		−18.3	

2006 Canadian federal election
Party	Candidate	Votes	%	±%	Expenditures
Liberal	Jean Lapierre	14,282	35.18	−5.76	$69,816
Bloc Québécois	Jacques Léonard	11,778	29.01	−4.24	$63,590
New Democratic	Léo-Paul Lauzon	6,984	17.20	+3.14	$26,625
Conservative	Daniel Fournier	5,168	12.73	+6.76	$73,991
Green	François Pilon	1,957	4.82	+0.53	$425
Independent	Eric Roach Denis	101	0.25		$431
Progressive Canadian	Philip Paynter	94	0.23		none listed
Marxist–Leninist	Linda Sullivan	88	0.22	−0.09	none listed
Independent	Yan Lacombe	85	0.21		none listed
Independent	Xavier Rochon	34	0.08		$572
Independent	Régent Millette	22	0.05		none listed
Total valid votes		40,593	100.00		
Total rejected ballots		282	0.69		
Turnout		40,875	60.78	−4.65	
Electors on the lists		67,253			

Source: Official Results, Elections Canada and Financial Returns, Elections Canada.

2004 Canadian federal election
Party	Candidate	Votes	%	±%	Expenditures
Liberal	Jean Lapierre	15,675	40.94	−6.74	$58,392
Bloc Québécois	François Rebello	12,730	33.25	+4.96	$63,640
New Democratic	Omar Aktouf	5,382	14.06	+8.48	$11,371
Conservative	Marc Rousseau	2,284	5.97	−5.37	$38,835
Green	Shaun Perceval-Maxwell	1,643	4.29	+0.54	$475
Marijuana	Yan Lacombe	452	1.18	-1.39	
Marxist–Leninist	Linda Sullivan	120	0.31	−0.18	
Total valid votes/Expense limit		38,286	100.00	–	$73,313

2000 Canadian federal election
Party	Candidate	Votes	%	±%	Expenditures
Liberal	Martin Cauchon	18,796	47.68	−2.47	$52,920
Bloc Québécois	Amir Khadir	11,151	28.29	−0.10	$50,207
Progressive Conservative	Robert Archambault	3,190	8.09	−4.12	$3,360
New Democratic	Peter Graefe	2,199	5.58	−0.86	$590
Green	Jan Schotte	1,478	3.75	–	$260
Alliance	Josée Duchesneau	1,283	3.25	–	$1,425
Marijuana	Huguette Plourde	1,013	2.57	–	none listed
Marxist–Leninist	Louise Charron	194	0.49	−0.36	$10
Communist	Pierre Smith	118	0.30	–	$187
Total		39,422	100.00		

1997 Canadian federal election
Party	Candidate	Votes	%	±%
Liberal	Martin Cauchon	22,271	50.15	+3.34
Bloc Québécois	Michel Sarra-Bournet	12,608	28.39	−8.98
Progressive Conservative	Marguerite Sicard	5,424	12.21	+3.30
New Democratic	Tooker Gomberg	2,862	6.44	+1.89
Natural Law	Denis Cauchon	868	1.95	+0.45
Marxist–Leninist	Louise Charron	378	0.85	+0.46
Total		44,411	100.00	–

1993 Canadian federal election
Party	Candidate	Votes	%	±%
Liberal	Martin Cauchon	21,638	46.81	+12.10
Bloc Québécois	Jean-Louis Hérivault	17,274	37.37	–
Progressive Conservative	Jean Pierre Hogue	4,119	8.91	−29.52
New Democratic	Catherine Kallos	2,104	4.55	−15.93
Natural Law	Daniel Bergeron	694	1.50	–
Marxist–Leninist	Michel Rocheleau	179	0.39	–
Abolitionist	Sylvain M. Coulombe	131	0.28	–
Commonwealth of Canada	Mamunor Rashid	89	0.19	−0.07
Total		46,228	100.00	–

1988 Canadian federal election
Party	Candidate	Votes	%	±%
Progressive Conservative	Jean-Pierre Hogue	17,597	38.43	+9.15
Liberal	Lucie Pépin	15,895	34.71	−6.21
New Democratic	Louise O'Neill	9,379	20.48	+1.82
Green	Harriett Fels	1,342	2.93	+0.42
Rhinoceros	Milenko P. Miljévic	1,077	2.35	−1.84
Communist	Monique Marcotte	200	0.44	−0.07
Independent	Fernand Deschamps	183	0.40	–
Commonwealth of Canada	Guy Huard	117	0.26	−0.13
Total		45,790	100.00	–

1984 Canadian federal election
Party	Candidate	Votes	%	±%
Liberal	Lucie Pépin	14,508	40.92	−30.57
Progressive Conservative	Anne-Marie Sylvestre	10,383	29.28	+21.96
New Democratic	Johanne Beaudin	6,687	18.86	+6.44
Rhinoceros	Claude V.U. Hamel	1,484	4.19	−2.235
Parti nationaliste	Roger Lebeuf	1,185	3.34	–
Green	François Lubrina	890	2.51	–
Communist	Jocelyne Rioux	182	0.51	+0.04
Commonwealth of Canada	Christiane Deland-Gervais	139	0.39	–
Total		35,458	100.00	–

1980 Canadian federal election
Party	Candidate	Votes	%	±%
Liberal	Marc Lalonde	23,004	71.49	−0.66
New Democratic	Claire A. Brisson	3,996	12.42	+2.09
Progressive Conservative	Diane Chevrette	2,355	7.32	+1.96
Rhinoceros	Philippe Langlois	2,065	6.42	−0.02
Independent	Danielle Trudel	277	0.86	–
Communist	Jocelyne Rioux	150	0.47	+0.01
Independent	H.-Georges Grenier	140	0.44	–
Union populaire	Colette Picard-Desjardins	128	0.40	+0.13
Marxist–Leninist	Robert Wallace	64	0.20	−0.03
Total		32,179	100.00	–

1979 Canadian federal election
Party	Candidate	Votes	%	±%
Liberal	Marc Lalonde	28,710	72.15	−0.15
New Democratic	Claire A. Brisson	4,112	10.33	−1.91
Rhinoceros	Serge Beauchemin	2,564	6.44	–
Progressive Conservative	Henriette Guérin	2,134	5.36	−5.30
Social Credit	Philippe Chartrand	1,765	4.44	+2.09
Communist	Jocelyne Rioux	185	0.46	–
Independent	Fred Haight	122	0.31	–
Union populaire	G. Spooner	108	0.27	–
Marxist–Leninist	Robert Wallace	91	0.23	−0.86
Total		39,791	100.00	–

1974 Canadian federal election
Party	Candidate	Votes	%	±%
Liberal	Marc Lalonde	20,400	72.30	+6.82
New Democratic	Georges Louis Valois	3,453	12.24	−3.74
Progressive Conservative	Symone Beaudin	3,007	10.66	+2.06
Social Credit	Joseph-Endré De Csavossy	663	2.35	−1.95
Independent	Vera Jackson	399	1.41	–
Marxist–Leninist	Micheline Mélanson	292	1.03	–
Total		28,214	100.00	–

1972 Canadian federal election
Party	Candidate	Votes	%	±%
Liberal	Marc Lalonde	21,399	65.48	−13.18
New Democratic	Henri-François Gautrin	5,223	15.98	+4.58
Progressive Conservative	André Poitras	2,811	8.60	−1.34
Rhinoceros	Réginald Martel	1,565	4.79	–
Social Credit	Maurice Benoit	1,404	4.30	–
Independent	Harold J. Glick	168	0.51	–
Independent	H.-Georges Grenier	109	0.33	–
Total		32,679	100.00	–

1968 Canadian federal election
Party	Candidate	Votes	%	±%
Liberal	Aurélien Noël	24,219	78.66	+23.99
New Democratic	Saul Handelman	3,511	11.40	−31.03
Progressive Conservative	Neil Morrison	3,059	9.94	–
Total		30,789	100.00	–

=== Outremont—Saint-Jean, 1949–1968 ===
Canadian federal by-election, 29 May 1967
Party	Candidate	Votes	%	±%
On Mr. Lamontagne's resignation, 4 June 1967
Liberal	Aurélien Noël	6,262	54.67%	+2.10%
New Democratic	Denis Lazure	4,860	42.43%	+25.89%
Esprit social	Henri-Georges Grenier	214	1.87%	−0.19%
Rhinoceros	F.-L.-M. Bonnier	118	1.03%	
Total valid votes		11,454	100.00%	

1965 Canadian federal election
Party	Candidate	Votes	%	±%	
Liberal	Maurice Lamontagne	11,855	52.57%	−4.06%	
New Democratic	Monique Ferron	3,730	16.54%	−1.45%	
Progressive Conservative	Albert Guilbeault	3,241	14.37%	−5.56%	
Ralliement créditiste	André Poitras	3,259	14.45%	+9.01%	2.06%
Droit vital personnel	Henri-Georges Grenier	465	2.06%		
Total valid votes		22,550	100.00%		

Note: Ralliement créditiste vote is compared to Social Credit vote in the 1963 election.

1963 Canadian federal election
Party	Candidate	Votes	%	±%
Liberal	Maurice Lamontagne	13,305	56.63%	+9.55%
Progressive Conservative	Marc Lacoste	4,684	19.94%	−10.28%
New Democratic	Thérèse Casgrain	4,227	17.99%	−2.02%
Social Credit	Léopold Savard	1,278	5.44%	+2.76%
Total valid votes		23,494	100.00%	

1962 Canadian federal election
Party	Candidate	Votes	%	±%
Liberal	Romuald Bourque	10,134	47.08%	−8.51%
Progressive Conservative	Marc Lacoste	6,504	30.22%	−8.72%
New Democratic	Thérèse Casgrain	4,308	20.02%	+14.55%
Social Credit	Jean-Guy Laprise	577	2.68%	
Total valid votes		21,523	100.00%	

Note: NDP vote is compared to CCF vote in 1958 election.

1958 Canadian federal election
Party	Candidate	Votes	%	±%
Liberal	Romuald Bourque	12,715	55.60%	−17.10%
Progressive Conservative	Conrad Archambault	8,906	38.94%	+18.46%
Co-operative Commonwealth	Gaston Miron	1,249	5.46%	−1.36%
Total valid votes		22,870	100.00%	

1957 Canadian federal election
Party	Candidate	Votes	%	±%
Liberal	Romuald Bourque	13,840	72.70%	+3.92%
Progressive Conservative	René Dostaler	3,899	20.48%	−4.65%
Co-operative Commonwealth	Gaston Miron	1,299	6.82%	+4.22%
Total valid votes		19,038	100.00%	

1953 Canadian federal election
Party	Candidate	Votes	%	±%
Liberal	Romuald Bourque	11,536	68.77%	+12.75%
Progressive Conservative	Gaston Sylvestre	4,216	25.13%	−3.37%
Co-operative Commonwealth	Pierre-D. Gagnon	436	2.60%	−7.50%
Labor–Progressive	Anne Eizner	406	2.42%	
Independent Progressive Conservative	Homère Louiselle	180	1.07%	
Total valid votes		16,774	100.00%	

Canadian federal by-election, 6 October 1952
Party	Candidate	Votes	%	±%
On Mr. Rinfret being appointed Puisne Judge, Court of Queen's Bench, Quebec, 12 February 1952
Liberal	Romuald Bourque	6,294	56.02%	−20.30%
Progressive Conservative	Claude Nolin	3,203	28.51%	+4.83%
Co-operative Commonwealth	Thérèse Casgrain	1,135	10.10%	
Independent Liberal	Raymond Bourque	442	3.93%	
Independent	Ben Ash	161	1.43%	
Total valid votes		11,235	100.00%	

1949 Canadian federal election
Party	Candidate	Votes	%	±%
Liberal	Édouard Rinfret	16,215	76.32%	+20.28%
Progressive Conservative	Alphonse Bélanger	5,030	23.68%	+9.51%
Total valid votes		21,245	100.00%	

=== Outremont, 1935–1949 ===
1945 Canadian federal election
Party	Candidate	Votes	%	±%
Liberal	Édouard-Gabriel Rinfret	14,836	56.04%	−8.01%
Progressive Conservative	Joseph Hector Bender	3,750	14.17%	
Bloc populaire	Joseph-Alfred Goyer	3,259	12.31%	
Independent Liberal	John P. Callaghan	1,762	6.66%	
Co-operative Commonwealth	Abraham Jacob Rosenstein	1,639	6.19%	
Labor–Progressive	Gertrude Partridge	1,227	4.63%	
Total valid votes		26,473	100.00%	

Canadian federal by-election, 30 November 1942
Party	Candidate	Votes	%	±%
On Mr. Vien's resignation, 5 October 1942
Liberal	Léo Richer Laflèche	12,378	64.05%	−2.35%
Bloc populaire	Jean Drapeau	6,948	35.95%	
Total valid votes		19,326	100.00%	

1940 Canadian federal election
Party	Candidate	Votes	%	±%
Liberal	Thomas Vien	14,511	66.40%	10.50%
National Government	Joseph-Hector Bender	4,556	20.85%	−14.10%
Independent Liberal	Ernest Poulin	2,787	12.75%	
Total valid votes		21,854	100.00%	

Note: "National Government" vote is compared to Conservative vote in 1935 election.

1935 Canadian federal election
Party	Candidate	Votes	%
Liberal	Thomas Vien	11,260	55.90%
Conservative	Jean-Joseph Penverne	7,040	34.95%
Reconstruction	Hervé Roch	1,844	9.15%
Total valid votes		20,144	100.00%

== See also ==
- List of Canadian electoral districts
- Historical federal electoral districts of Canada
