= Léo Richer Laflèche =

Canadian politician (1888–1956)

Léo Richer LaFlèche PC DSO
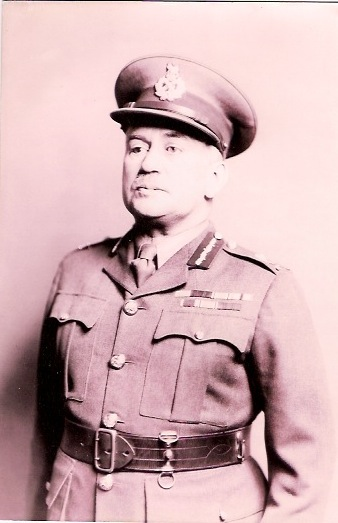

Member of Parliament for Outremont
- In office November 30, 1942 – June 10, 1945
- Preceded by: Thomas Vien
- Succeeded by: Édouard Rinfret

Personal details
- Born: April 16, 1888 Concordia, Kansas, U.S.
- Died: March 7, 1956 (aged 67) Montreal, Quebec, Canada
- Party: Liberal
- Spouse: Jane Brady (m. 1920)
- Children: 5
- Occupation: Major General, Civil Servant, Diplomat, Politician
- Cabinet: Minister of National War Services (1942-1945)

Military service
- Allegiance: Canada
- Branch/service: Canadian Army
- Years of service: 1914−1940
- Rank: Major General
- Unit: 22nd Battalion, CEF
- Battles/wars: World War I World War II

Major General Léo Richer LaFlèche, PC DSO (April 16, 1888 – March 7, 1956) was a Canadian general, civil servant, diplomat, and politician.

Léo Richer La Flèche was born in Concordia, Kansas, on April 16, 1888. The same year, with his parents, Léo moved to Sorel, Quebec, because of his father's work in Ottawa as a civil servant. Leo managed the Molson Bank in Ville St-Pierre until the outbreak of the First World War. He served with the Royal 22nd Battalion, CEF, during World War I, as an infantry officer, where he was severely wounded. On June 17, 1916, a soldier in Léo's battalion noticed him lying in a field, left for dead. He and four other soldiers transported the dying officer on a stretcher as they crossed a battlefield under German artillery fire. The General in charge spotted the heroic act and as a result, the five soldiers were each awarded a Military Medal. In 1917, Léo was awarded the Distinguished Service Order and the Légion d'honneur of France for his service. He later became a lieutenant-colonel commanding the District Depot No. 4, Montreal which consisted of roughly 70,000 men.

He would later achieve the rank of major general. He co-founded the Canadian Legion in 1925 and became dominion president of the Canadian Legion in 1929. From 1932 to 1939, he was Deputy Minister of National Defence, Vice-Chairman Defence Council and briefly served as military attaché to Paris before the German invasion.

From 1940 to 1942, he was the associate deputy minister of War Services and was chairman of the National Film Board from 1941 to 1943. In 1941, he received an honorary LL.D. from the University of Ottawa.

He was elected as the Liberal candidate to the House of Commons of Canada for the Quebec electoral district of Outremont in a by-election on November 30, 1942, called after the MP at the time, Thomas Vien, resigned. He defeated future mayor of Montreal Jean Drapeau who was running for the Bloc Populaire. Later that year, Prime minister Mackenzie King named him Minister of National War Services. He remained in this role until he became the first Canadian ambassador to Greece on April 17, 1945, a post he kept until 1949.

On October 20, 1949, he presented his credentials to the governor general of Australia as the new high commissioner of Canada. On August 19, 1952, he also held this position in Buenos Aires, Argentina, as he officially took his post as the Canadian ambassador extraordinary and plenipotentiary in charge of the diplomatic relations with neighbouring Uruguay. He returned to Canada in 1955. He died the next year at the age of 67. His grave is in the Notre Dame des Neiges Cemetery of Montreal.

Non-profit organization positions
Preceded by Arthur Currie	President of the Royal Canadian Legion; 1929–1931	Succeeded by John Roper
Diplomatic posts
Preceded by John Kennett Starnes	Canadian Ambassador Extraordinary and Plenipotentiary to Greece; 1945–1949	Succeeded by George Loranger Magann
Preceded by Kenneth Alfred Greene	Canadian High Commissioner to Australia; 1949–1950	Succeeded by Carman Millward Croft
Preceded by Lionel Victor Joseph Roy	Canadian Ambassador Extraordinary and Plenipotentiary to Argentina; 1952–1955	Succeeded by Louis Phillippe Picard
New office	Canadian Envoy Extraordinary and Minister Plenipotentiary to Uruguay; 1952–1955	Succeeded by Fulgence Charpentier
