= Rachel Bendayan =

Canadian politician (born 1980)

The Honourable Rachel Bendayan PC MP

Parliamentary Secretary to the Prime Minister
- Incumbent
- Assumed office June 5, 2025 Serving with Kody Blois
- Prime Minister: Mark Carney

Minister of Immigration, Refugees and Citizenship
- In office March 14, 2025 – May 13, 2025
- Prime Minister: Mark Carney
- Preceded by: Marc Miller
- Succeeded by: Lena Diab

Minister of Official Languages
- In office December 20, 2024 – March 14, 2025
- Prime Minister: Justin Trudeau
- Preceded by: Ginette Petitpas Taylor
- Succeeded by: Position abolished

Associate Minister of Public Safety
- In office December 20, 2024 – March 14, 2025
- Prime Minister: Justin Trudeau
- Minister: David McGuinty
- Preceded by: Position established
- Succeeded by: Position abolished

Member of Parliament for Outremont
- Incumbent
- Assumed office February 25, 2019
- Preceded by: Tom Mulcair

Personal details
- Born: Montreal, Quebec, Canada
- Party: Liberal
- Education: McGill University
- Profession: Lawyer

Rachel Bendayan is a Canadian politician who served as the minister of immigration, refugees and citizenship from March to May 2025. A member of the Liberal Party, Bendayan was elected to the House of Commons following a by-election on February 25, 2019, serving as the member of Parliament (MP) for Outremont.

Bendayan worked as a lawyer before entering politics. She ran in Outremont during the 2015 federal election, where she placed second to Thomas Mulcair, the leader of the Official Opposition and New Democratic Party (NDP). Following Mulcair's resignation as MP, a by-election was held in February 2019, where Bendayan flipped the seat for the Liberal Party. She was subsequently re-elected in the October general election, and in 2021.

== Early life ==
Bendayan was born and raised in a Moroccan-Jewish family. She studied law at McGill University and obtained her degree in 2007, specializing in commercial litigation and international arbitration.

After graduating, Bendayan was employed by the Norton Rose Fulbright law firm and also teaches at the Faculty of Law of the Université de Montréal.

== Political career ==
A member of the Liberal Party of Canada, she was a candidate for the first time in Outremont in the 2015 federal election, against Thomas Mulcair, the leader of the official opposition. She finished second with 33.4% of the vote. After the elections, she then became chief of staff to Bardish Chagger, Minister of Small Business and Tourism.

Following Thomas Mulcair's departure from political life in June 2018, Bendayan announced her intention to once again be a candidate for the Liberal Party in the next election. She was nominated as a candidate against the teacher and activist Kim Manning in December 2018, after a vote by members of the constituency. The elections were finally called to take place on February 25. She was elected after winning with 40.4% of votes, 2,161 votes more than her nearest opponent, the NDP's Julia Sánchez with 26.1%.

Bendayan was re-elected in the 2019 federal election, obtaining 46.2% of the votes and beating her closest opponent by 10,829 votes. She was then appointed Parliamentary Secretary to the Minister of Small Business, Export Promotion and International Trade, Mary Ng, by Prime Minister Justin Trudeau.

Bendayan was elected for a third time in the 2021 federal election with 45.4% of the votes.

On December 20, 2024, she became the minister of Official Languages and associate minister of public safety. On March 14, 2025, she was sworn in as Minister of Immigration, Refugees and Citizenship under the new Liberal government led by Mark Carney. Bendayan was reelected in the 2025 federal election on April 28, 2025 and dropped from the 30th Canadian Ministry on May 13, 2025.

== Antisemitic attacks ==
Along with other Jewish Liberal Party candidates, Bendayan was a victim of anti-Semitic attacks during the campaign for the 2021 Canadian federal election.

== Controversies ==
In the election year of 2025, Rachel Bendayan's campaign team sent Ramadan calendars to Muslim constituents. She was criticized for her data collection practices, using a loophole in the Canadian Privacy Act to collect data without the constituents consent and for sending the calendars to non-Muslims. The electoral strategy was also criticized by former Parti Quebecois leader Jean-Francois Lisee.

== Electoral record ==
2025 Canadian federal election: Outremont
| Party | Candidate | Votes | % | ±% | Expenditures |
|---|---|---|---|---|---|
| Liberal | Rachel Bendayan | 26,024 | 55.20 | +10.84 | $98,796.10 |
| Conservative | Ronan Reich | 5,911 | 12.54 | +5.23 | $24,711.42 |
| Bloc Québécois | Rémi Lebeuf | 5,644 | 11.97 | −3.47 | $3,085.53 |
| New Democratic | Ève Péclet | 5,024 | 10.66 | −16.64 | $29,001.06 |
| Green | Jonathan Pedneault | 4,539 | 9.63 | +6.51 | $76,595.41 |
| Total valid votes | | 47,142 | 98.73 | –0.08 | $125,931.56 |
| Total rejected ballots | | 606 | 1.27 | +0.08 | |
| Turnout | | 47,748 | 62.34 | +5.46 | |
| Eligible voters | | 76,592 | | | |
| Liberal notional hold | | Swing | | +2.81 | |
Source: Elections Canada

2021 Canadian federal election: Outremont
| Party | Candidate | Votes | % | ±% | Expenditures |
|---|---|---|---|---|---|
| Liberal | Rachel Bendayan | 16,714 | 45.39 | -0.80 | $74,361.58 |
| New Democratic | Ève Péclet | 9,579 | 26.02 | +5.95 | $25,871.29 |
| Bloc Québécois | Célia Grimard | 5,535 | 15.03 | +1.18 | $10,443.22 |
| Conservative | Jasmine Louras | 2,882 | 7.83 | +1.30 | none listed |
| Green | Grace Tarabey | 1,198 | 3.25 | -8.58 | $1,719.40 |
| People's | Yehuda Pinto | 819 | 2.22 | +1.33 | 1,871.20 |
| Independent | Angela-Angie Joshi | 93 | 0.25 | N/A | $3,516.54 |
| Total valid votes/expense limit | | 36,820 | 98.8 | – | $104,612.20 |
| Total rejected ballots | | 456 | 1.2 | | |
| Turnout | | 37,276 | 57.2 | -5.0 | |
| Eligible voters | | 65,143 | | | |
| Liberal hold | | Swing | | -3.38 | |
Source: Elections Canada

2019 Canadian federal election: Outremont
| Party | Candidate | Votes | % | ±% | Expenditures |
|---|---|---|---|---|---|
| Liberal | Rachel Bendayan | 19,148 | 46.19 | +5.76 | $47,498.81 |
| New Democratic | Andrea Clarke | 8,319 | 20.07 | -7.45 | none listed |
| Bloc Québécois | Célia Grimard | 5,741 | 13.85 | +2.63 | $9,862.60 |
| Green | Daniel Green | 5,018 | 12.1 | -0.83 | none listed |
| Conservative | Jasmine Louras | 2,707 | 6.53 | +0.39 | $4,912.03 |
| People's | Sabin Levesque | 369 | 0.89 | -0.65 | none listed |
| Rhinoceros | Mark John Hiemstra | 155 | 0.37 | | none listed |
| Total valid votes/expense limit | | 41,457 | 100.0 | $102,446.50 | |
| Total rejected ballots | | 455 | | | |
| Turnout | | 41,912 | 62.2 | | |
| Eligible voters | | 67,842 | | | |
| Liberal hold | | Swing | | +6.61 | |
Source: Elections Canada

Canadian federal by-election, February 25, 2019: Outremont Resignation of Tom Mulcair
| Party | Candidate | Votes | % | ±% |
|---|---|---|---|---|
| Liberal | Rachel Bendayan | 6,086 | 40.4 | ▲6.9 |
| New Democratic | Julia Sánchez | 3,925 | 26.1 | ▼18 |
| Green | Daniel Green | 1,889 | 12.5 | ▲8.9 |
| Bloc Québécois | Michel Duchesne | 1,683 | 11.2 | ▲2.8 |
| Conservative | Jasmine Louras | 1,098 | 7.3 | ▼2.2 |
| People's | James Seale | 322 | 2.1 | New |
| Independent | William Barrett | 52 | 0.3 | New |
| Total valid votes | | 15,053 | 100.0 | |
| Total rejected ballots | | 135 | – | |
| Turnout | | 15,188 | 21.6 | |
| Eligible voters | | 70,414 | | |
| Liberal gain from New Democratic | | Swing | | ▲25 |
Source: Elections Canada

2015 Canadian federal election: Outremont
| Party | Candidate | Votes | % | ±% | Expenditures |
|---|---|---|---|---|---|
| New Democratic | Tom Mulcair | 19,242 | 44.11 | −11.57 | $101,332.88 |
| Liberal | Rachel Bendayan | 14,597 | 33.46 | +11.84 | $101,506.39 |
| Conservative | Rodolphe Husny | 4,159 | 9.53 | +1.55 | $7,828.89 |
| Bloc Québécois | Roger Galland Barou | 3,668 | 8.41 | −3.20 | $6,959.30 |
| Green | Amara Diallo | 1,575 | 3.61 | +1.37 | – |
| Libertarian | Francis Pouliot | 216 | 0.50 | – | – |
| Communist | Adrien Welsh | 162 | 0.37 | – | – |
| Total valid votes/Expense limit | | 43,619 | 100.00 | – | $204,392.07 |
| Total rejected ballots | | 426 | 0.97 | – | – |
| Turnout | | 44,045 | 62.42 | – | – |
| Eligible voters | | 70,559 | – | – | – |
| New Democratic hold | | Swing | | | |
Source: Elections Canada
