= Aurélien Noël =

Canadian politician

- Official 1968 portrait

Member of Parliament for Outremont—Saint-Jean
- In office May 1967 – June 1968

Member of Parliament for Outremont
- In office June 1968 – September 1972

Personal details
- Born: 16 September 1904 Saint-Ferdinand, Quebec, Canada
- Died: 16 December 1991 (aged 87)
- Party: Liberal
- Profession: chartered accountant, lawyer, lecturer, professor

Aurélien Noël (16 September 1904 – 16 December 1991) was a Canadian chartered accountant, lawyer, lecturer, professor and politician. Noël served as a Liberal party member of the House of Commons of Canada. He was born in Saint-Ferdinand, Quebec.

He was first elected at the Outremont—Saint-Jean riding in a 29 May 1967 by-election, called when the previous Member of Parliament, Maurice Lamontagne, was appointed to the Senate.

As the 1968 federal election approached, Noël faced some pressure to step aside so that Maurice Sauvé, an area resident, could become the Liberal candidate for the riding, which was then renamed Outremont. However, Noël did not give way to Sauvé and was re-elected to a full term in the 28th Canadian Parliament. Noël's career in Parliament ended when he was replaced as Outremont's Liberal party candidate by Marc Lalonde for the 1972 election. Noël did not participate in another federal election thereafter. He died on 16 December 1991.
