= Romuald Bourque =

Canadian politician

The Hon. Romuald Bourque
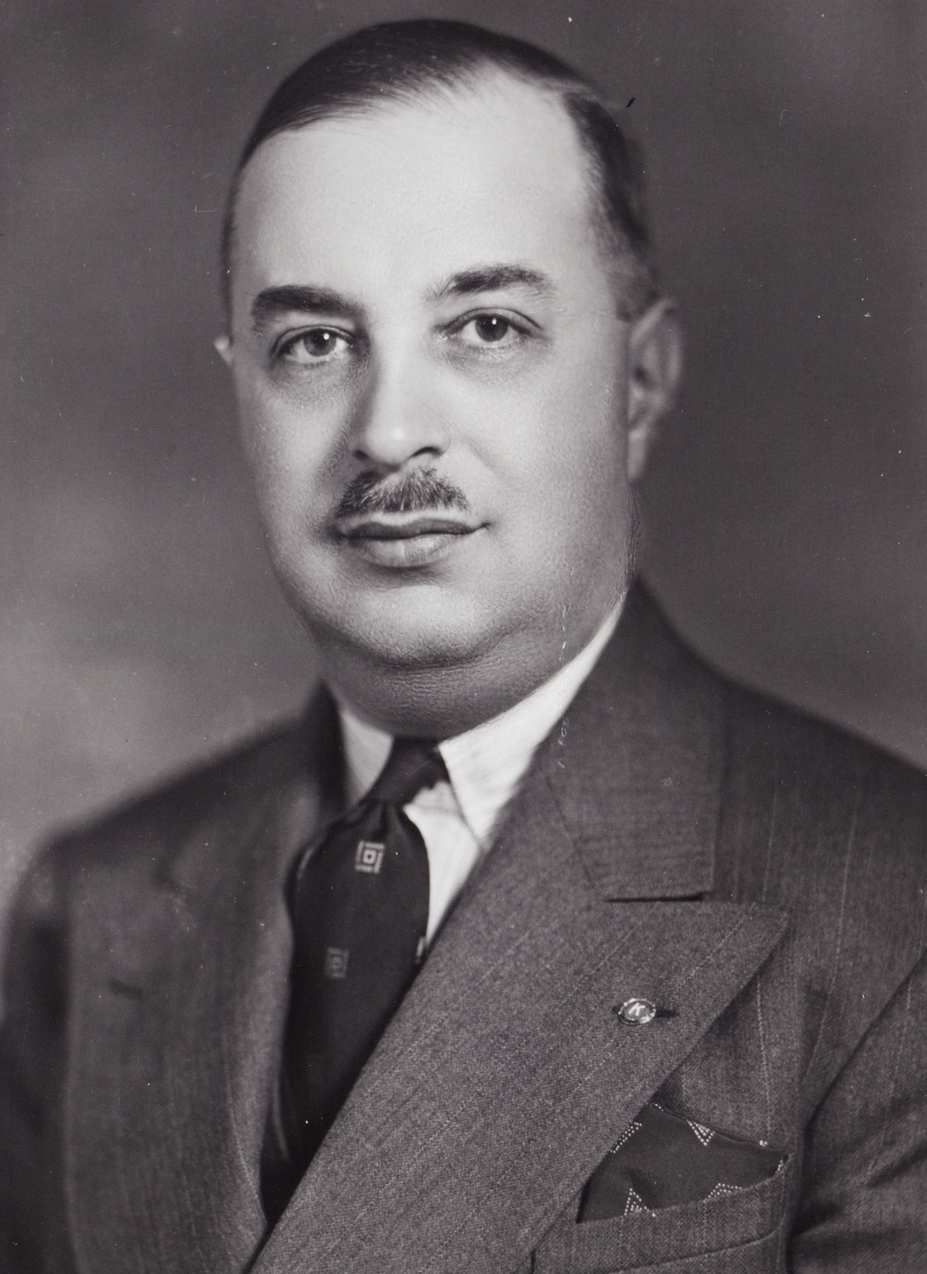

Member of the Canadian Parliament for Outremont—Saint-Jean
- In office 1952–1963
- Preceded by: Édouard Rinfret
- Succeeded by: Maurice Lamontagne

Senator for De la Vallière, Quebec
- In office 1963–1974
- Appointed by: Lester B. Pearson
- Preceded by: Donat Raymond
- Succeeded by: Jean Marchand

Personal details
- Born: 6 December 1889 Ottawa, Ontario
- Died: 14 August 1974 (aged 84)
- Resting place: Notre Dame des Neiges Cemetery
- Party: Liberal

Romuald Bourque (6 December 1889 – 14 August 1974) was a Quebec businessman and political figure. He represented Outremont—Saint-Jean in the House of Commons of Canada as a Liberal member from 1952 to 1963. Bourque was a member of the Senate of Canada for De la Vallière division from 1963 to 1974.

He was born in Ottawa, Ontario in 1889, the son of François Bourque. He apprenticed as a printer there and then went to Montreal where he worked for the Montreal Herald. In 1920, he founded the newspaper Le Nouvelliste at Trois-Rivières. In 1926, he became sales manager for the Cie Mercury Press Limited at Montreal, becoming vice-president in 1930. Bourque was also mayor of Outremont from 1949 to 1964. He was named to the Senate in 1963, died in office in 1974 and was buried in the Notre Dame des Neiges Cemetery.

In 1963 until his death in 1974, Senator Romuald Bourque took over the position of National President of the Last Post Fund.

His brother, E. A. Bourque, was mayor of Ottawa in 1949 and 1950.

His great-nephew Pierre Bourque was Alderman, City of Ottawa, and Councillor, Regional Municipality of Ottawa-Carleton in 1991.
