= Emmanuella Lambropoulos =

Canadian politician (born 1990)

Emmanuella Lambropoulos MP
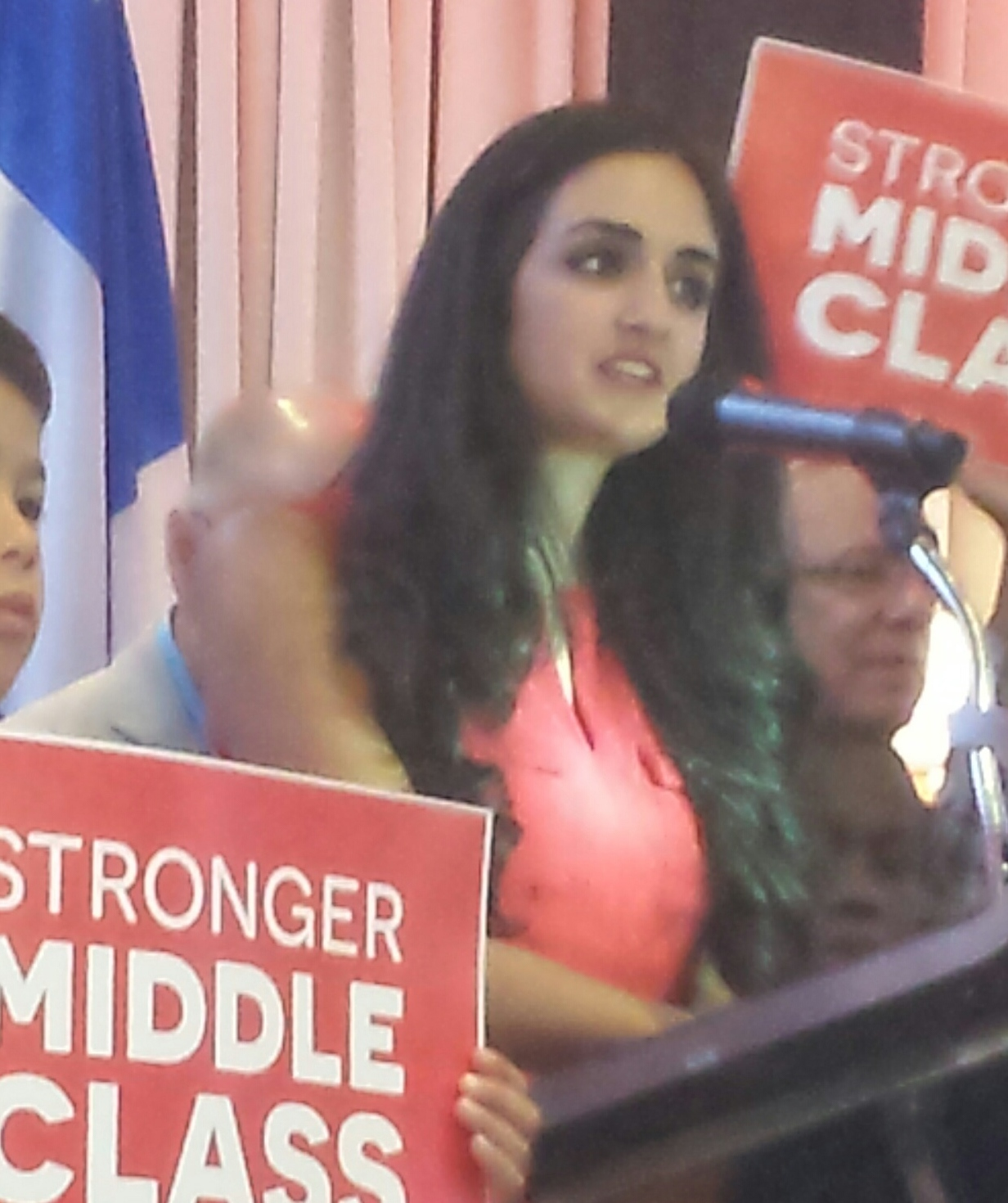

Member of Parliament for Saint-Laurent
- Incumbent
- Assumed office April 3, 2017
- Preceded by: Stéphane Dion

Personal details
- Born: 1991 Saint-Laurent, Quebec, Canada
- Party: Liberal
- Parent(s): Athanasios Lambropoulos (father); Matina Aerikos (mother)
- Education: McGill University
- Profession: Teacher, Politician

Emmanuella Lambropoulos (born 1991) is a Canadian politician serving as the Member of Parliament (MP) for Saint-Laurent since 2017. A member of the Liberal Party of Canada, she was elected to the House of Commons in a by-election, succeeding Stéphane Dion.

A 26-year-old teacher from Rosemount High School at the time of her election, she won the Liberal nomination in an upset, defeating former provincial immigration minister Yolande James and future Liberal MNA Marwah Rizqy.

== Early life ==
Lambropoulos was born in 1991, and was raised in Saint-Laurent, Quebec, now a borough of Montreal. She attended Gardenview elementary school, LaurenHill Academy high school and Vanier College, where she received the Program Award upon graduation, awarded in recognition of outstanding achievement in the Social Science (Psychology Major) Program. During her time at Vanier, Emmanuella was a member of the Vanier Key Society, a group composed of a talented group of students chosen for their high academic standing, strong communication skills and demonstrated leadership abilities. She then graduated from McGill University with a Bachelor of Education in 2013, where she was the president of the McGill Hellenic Students Association. She then became a teacher at Rosemount High School, where she taught French and history. Most recently, Lambropoulos completed her Master of Arts in Educational Leadership from McGill University.

== Political career ==
Born and raised in Saint-Laurent, Emmanuella Lambropoulos has been representing the riding in the House of Commons since she was elected in the 2017 by-election. The seat in Saint-Laurent became available after the incumbent MP, Stéphane Dion, announced he would be leaving politics in January 2017, following a cabinet shuffle in which he lost his portfolio as foreign affairs minister. Lambropoulos had previously volunteered on Dion's team.

Lambropoulos won the Liberal nomination on March 8, 2017, against the favoured candidate, Yolande James. James had previously been a provincial cabinet minister with strong ties to the Liberal party. However, she came in third place. Another likely candidate, Alan DeSousa, was not included on the ballot at all after being turned down by the Liberal Party. Lambropoulos's campaign received strong support from the Greek community.

She was officially elected as an MP in the Saint-Laurent by-election on April 3, 2017, with 59.1% of votes. Ms. Lambropoulos has served on the parliamentary committees for Veterans Affairs (May 2017-Sept 2018), Status of Women (Sept 2017-Sept 2019), and Official Languages (Sept 2018-Sept 2019). Her most frequently-discussed topics in Parliament are disabilities and the status of women. As part of her work for the Status of Women committee, she has studied such issues as shelters and transition homes for women who are seeking to escape domestic violence, and barriers to women entering politics. On the Official Languages committee, she advocates for anglophones as the minority language group in Québec.

On October 21, 2019, she was elected with 58.9% of the popular vote.

On September 20, 2021, she was elected with 59% of the votes.

== Personal life ==
Lambropoulos speaks English, French, and Greek.

== Committees ==
- Veterans Affair from May 1, 2017, to September 19, 2018
- Status of Women from September 18, 2017, to September 11, 2019
- Official Languages from September 19, 2018, to November 19, 2020
- Industry, Science and Technology from February 5, 2020, to Present
- Public Safety from November 30, 2020, to Present
- COVID-19 Pandemic from April 20, 2020, to June 18, 2020

On November 30, 2020, Emmanuella Lambropoulos became a member of the standing committee on Public Safety and National Security. During one of her first meetings at the Public Safety and National Security committee, she asked the chair of the Centre for Cyber Security how Canadian companies who deal directly with state-owned enterprises can protect themselves from cyber threats.

Lambropoulos is said to have helped many organizations in her riding, one of them is Centre communauté Bon courage, an organization that offers services to the riding's neediest families, obtain a total grant of $37,000 from the Canada Summer Jobs program. This organization succeeded in hiring 12 people, including five animation positions at Painter Park, following a joint job offer by Lambropoulos' Youth Council.

== Electoral record ==
2025 Canadian federal election: Saint-Laurent
Party	Candidate	Votes	%	±%	Expenditures
Liberal	Emmanuella Lambropoulos	26,021	58.89	−0.45	$62,879.51
Conservative	Richard Serour	12,477	28.24	+9.92	$12,447.31
Bloc Québécois	Marielle Gendron	2,523	5.71	−2.24	$3,409.13
New Democratic	Ryan Byrne	1,985	4.49	−6.27	$0.00
Green	Richard Chambers	693	1.57	+1.46	$0.00
People's	Manon Chevalier	349	0.79	−2.36	$4,352.84
Marxist–Leninist	Fernand Deschamps	137	0.31	−0.06	$0.00
Total valid votes		44,185	98.52	+0.23	$125,093.83
Total rejected ballots		663	1.48	-0.23	
Turnout		44,848	60.40	+3.52	
Eligible voters		74,250			
Liberal notional hold		Swing		−5.19	
Source: Elections Canada

2021 Canadian federal election: Saint-Laurent
Party	Candidate	Votes	%	±%	Expenditures
Liberal	Emmanuella Lambropoulos	22,056	59.1	+0.5	$50,070.07
Conservative	Richard Serour	6,902	18.5	+1.1	$5,185.93
New Democratic	Nathan Devereaux	4,059	10.9	+0.8	$2,501.88
Bloc Québécois	Florence Racicot	2,972	8.0	+0.9	$1,649.89
People's	Gregory Yablunovsky	1,182	3.2	+2.0	$1,947.63
Marxist–Leninist	Ginette Boutet	146	0.4	+0.2	$0.00
Total valid votes/expense limit		37,317	98.3	–	$104,997.64
Total rejected ballots		642	1.7		
Turnout		37,959	57.4		
Eligible voters		66,181			
Liberal hold		Swing		-0.3	
Source: Elections Canada

2019 Canadian federal election: Saint-Laurent
Party	Candidate	Votes	%	±%	Expenditures
Liberal	Emmanuella Lambropoulos	23,527	58.6	-0.56	none listed
Conservative	Richard Serour	7,005	17.4	-2.12	$27,597.55
New Democratic	Miranda Gallo	4,065	10.1	+2.3	$1,615.70
Bloc Québécois	Thérèse Miljours	2,845	7.1	+2.19	none listed
Green	Georgia Kokotsis	2,150	5.4	-2.59	$2,581.91
People's	Christopher Mikus	484	1.2	-	none listed
Marxist–Leninist	Ginette Boutet	71	0.2	-	$0.00
Total valid votes/expense limit		40,147	100.0		
Total rejected ballots		618			
Turnout		40,765	59.96		
Eligible voters		67,991			
Liberal hold		Swing		+0.78	
Source: Elections Canada

Canadian federal by-election, April 3, 2017: Saint-Laurent Resignation of Stéphane Dion
Party	Candidate	Votes	%	±%
Liberal	Emmanuella Lambropoulos	11,461	59.13	−2.44
Conservative	Jimmy Yu	3,784	19.52	+0.01
Green	Daniel Green	1,548	7.99	+5.57
New Democratic	Mathieu Auclair	1,511	7.80	−3.72
Bloc Québécois	William Fayad	951	4.91	+0.25
Rhinoceros	Chinook Blais-Leduc	129	0.67	–
Total valid votes/expense limit		19,384	100.0	–
Total rejected ballots		255	1.30	+0.30
Turnout		19,639	28.33	−30.65
Eligible voters		69,302		
Liberal hold		Swing		−1.24
Source: lop.parl.ca
