= Marc Lalonde =

Canadian politician (1929–2023)

The Honourable Marc Lalonde PC OC KC

Minister of Finance
- In office September 10, 1982 – September 16, 1984
- Prime Minister: Pierre Trudeau; John Turner
- Preceded by: Allan MacEachen
- Succeeded by: Michael Wilson

Minister of Energy, Mines and Resources
- In office March 3, 1980 – September 9, 1982
- Prime Minister: Pierre Trudeau
- Preceded by: Ray Hnatyshyn
- Succeeded by: Jean Chrétien

Minister of Justice and Attorney General of Canada
- In office November 24, 1978 – June 3, 1979
- Prime Minister: Pierre Trudeau
- Preceded by: Otto Lang
- Succeeded by: Jacques Flynn

Minister of State (Federal-Provincial Relations)
- In office September 16, 1977 – November 23, 1978
- Prime Minister: Pierre Trudeau
- Preceded by: New office
- Succeeded by: John Mercer Reid

Minister of National Health and Welfare
- In office November 27, 1972 – September 15, 1977
- Prime Minister: Pierre Trudeau
- Preceded by: John Munro
- Succeeded by: Monique Bégin

Member of Parliament for Outremont
- In office October 30, 1972 – September 3, 1984
- Preceded by: Aurélien Noël
- Succeeded by: Lucie Pépin

Principal Secretary to the Prime Minister
- In office 1968–1972
- Prime Minister: Pierre Trudeau
- Preceded by: John Hodgson
- Succeeded by: Martin O'Connell

Personal details
- Born: July 26, 1929 L'Île-Perrot, Quebec, Canada
- Died: May 6, 2023 (aged 93) Montreal
- Party: Liberal
- Spouse: Claire Tétreau
- Children: 4
- Education: Université de Montréal; University of Oxford; University of Ottawa
- Profession: Lawyer

Marc Lalonde PC OC KC (French pronunciation: [maʁk lalɔ̃d]; July 26, 1929 – May 6, 2023) was a Canadian politician who served as a cabinet minister, political staffer and lawyer. A lifelong member of the Liberal Party, he is best known for having served in various positions of government from the late 1960s to the mid-1980s, including serving as the Minister of Finance.

== Early life ==
Lalonde was born in L'Île-Perrot, Quebec, and obtained a Master of Laws degree from the Université de Montréal, a master's degree from Oxford University, and a Diplôme d'études supérieures en droit (D.E.S.D) from the University of Ottawa.

In 1959, he worked in Ottawa as a special adviser to Progressive Conservative Justice Minister Davie Fulton. He went to Montreal to practise law until 1967 when he returned to Ottawa to work as an adviser in the Prime Minister's Office under Liberal Prime Minister Lester B. Pearson. Lalonde remained when Pierre Trudeau became Prime Minister of Canada in 1968, serving as Principal Secretary. In this role during the 1970 October crisis he negotiated with Quebec premier Robert Bourassa and Montreal mayor Jean Drapeau to request the enactment of the War Measures Act in order to show that the enactment had the support of the Quebec and Montreal governments.

== Political career ==
At Trudeau's urging, he ran for a seat in the House of Commons of Canada in the 1972 election. Elected as the Liberal Member of Parliament (MP) for the riding of Outremont, Lalonde immediately joined the Cabinet as Minister of National Health and Welfare, a position he held until 1977. He was concurrently Minister of Amateur Sport until 1976 and was also Minister responsible for the Status of Women from 1974 to 1979.

A staunch federalist, he was also one of Trudeau's chief advisers on the situation in Quebec, taking the position of Minister of State on federal-provincial relations in the wake of the Parti Québécois victory in the 1976 Quebec provincial election. Lalonde led a clandestine body within the Canadian Federal Government, codenamed FAN TAN, that collected intelligence on the Quebec separatist movement and organized political action against the separatists.

Lalonde served as Minister of Justice from 1978 until the Liberal government's defeat in the 1979 election. When the Liberals returned to power in the 1980 election, Lalonde became Minister of Energy, Mines and Resources and instituted the National Energy Program which became intensely unpopular in Alberta. The Bank of Canada reported that economic problems had been accelerated and magnified. Inflation was most commonly between 9% and 10% annually.

Lalonde was appointed minister of finance in 1982. As finance minister, he tabled the 1983 and 1984 federal budgets; both budgets saw a substantial increase in the government budget deficit, as the deficit increased from $29.049 billion in 1982 to $37.167 billion in 1984. (Note: C$29.049 billion in 1982 is C$86.88 billion in 2025, while C$37.167 billion in 1984 is C$100.71 billion in 2025, according to calculations based on the consumer price index measure of inflation.)

When Trudeau resigned, Lalonde endorsed John Turner in the 1984 Liberal leadership convention and continued as finance minister after Turner succeeded Trudeau as prime minister in 1984, but did not run in the 1984 election which saw the Liberals suffer a landslide loss to the Progressive Conservatives.

== After politics ==
In 1989, he was made an Officer of the Order of Canada. In 2004, he was inducted into the Canadian Medical Hall of Fame.

In the 1990s, he served as an ad hoc judge at the International Court of Justice, and has also represented Canada in various trade disputes. He was a practising lawyer with the firm of Stikeman Elliott LLP in Montreal until his retirement in 2006.

Lalonde returned to the political arena in 2005 when Prime Minister Paul Martin named him co-president of the Liberal Party's electoral campaign in Quebec for the 39th Canadian federal election. Brigitte Legault, the president of the Young Liberals of Canada (Quebec), served as the other co-president.

Lalonde appeared before the House of Commons of Canada's Ethics Committee in November 2008 along with client Karlheinz Schreiber, who was being questioned in regard to the Airbus affair involving former PM Brian Mulroney.

Lalonde died on May 6, 2023, at age 93.

== Archives ==
There is a Marc Lalonde fonds at Library and Archives Canada.

== See also ==
- A new perspective on the health of Canadians, best known as the "Lalonde report"
- Canadian Football Act

== Notes ==
23rd Canadian Ministry (1984) – Cabinet of John Turner
Cabinet post (1)
Predecessor	Office	Successor
Cont'd from 22nd Min.	Minister of Finance; June 30, 1984 – September 16, 1984	Michael Wilson
22nd Canadian Ministry (1980–1984) – Second cabinet of Pierre Trudeau
Cabinet posts (2)
Predecessor	Office	Successor
Allan MacEachen	Minister of Finance; September 10, 1982 – June 29, 1984	Cont'd into 23rd Min.
Ramon John Hnatyshyn	Minister of Energy, Mines and Resources; March 3, 1980 – September 9, 1982	Jean Chrétien
20th Canadian Ministry (1968–1979) – First cabinet of Pierre Trudeau
Cabinet posts (4)
Predecessor	Office	Successor
Otto Lang	Minister of Justice and Attorney General of Canada; November 24, 1978 – June 3, 1979	Jacques Flynn
	Minister of State (Federal-Provincial Relations); September 16, 1977 – November 23, 1978	John Mercer Reid
John Munro	Minister of National Health and Welfare; November 27, 1972 – September 15, 1977	Monique Bégin
	Minister of Amateur Sport; November 27, 1972 – September 14, 1976	
Special Cabinet Responsibilities
Predecessor	Title	Successor
Robert Andras	Minister responsible for the Status of Women; August 8, 1974 – June 3, 1979	David MacDonald
Parliament of Canada
Preceded by Aurélien Noël, Liberal	Member of Parliament for Outremont; 1972–1984	Succeeded by Lucie Pépin, Liberal
