= 1983 Canadian federal budget =

Marc Lalonde's first national spending plan as Finance Minister

1983 Budget of the Canadian Federal Government
- Presented: 19 April 1983
- Country: Canada
- Parliament: 32nd
- Party: Liberal
- Finance minister: Marc Lalonde
- Total revenue: 65.261 billion
- Total expenditures: 97.624 billion
- Deficit: $32.363 billion

The Canadian federal budget for fiscal year 1983–84 was presented by Minister of Finance Marc Lalonde in the House of Commons of Canada on 19 April 1983.
