= Édouard Rinfret =

Canadian politician

The Honourable Édouard-Gabriel Rinfret PC, OC

Member of the Canadian Parliament for Outremont
- In office 1945–1949
- Preceded by: Léo Richer Laflèche
- Succeeded by: District was abolished in 1947

Member of the Canadian Parliament for Outremont—St-Jean
- In office 1949–1952
- Preceded by: District was created in 1947
- Succeeded by: Romuald Bourque

Personal details
- Born: May 12, 1905 Saint-Jérôme, Quebec
- Died: January 11, 1994 (aged 88)
- Party: Liberal
- Cabinet: Postmaster General (1949-1952)

Édouard-Gabriel Rinfret, PC, OC (May 12, 1905 – January 11, 1994) was a Canadian lawyer, politician and judge.

Born in Saint-Jérôme, Quebec, the son of Thibaudeau Rinfret, he was called to the Quebec bar in 1928. He was elected to the House of Commons of Canada in 1945 for the Quebec riding of Outremont. He was re-elected in 1949. A Liberal, he was Postmaster General from 1949 to 1952.

From 1952 to 1977, he was a judge of the Quebec Court of Appeal. From 1977 to 1980, he was the Chief Justice of the Province of Quebec.

In 1982, he was made an Officer of the Order of Canada. In 1979, he was awarded an honorary Doctor of Laws from the University of British Columbia.

There are Édouard Rinfret fonds at Library and Archives Canada and Bibliothèque et Archives nationales du Québec.
