= Saint-Laurent (federal electoral district) =

Federal electoral district in Quebec, Canada

Coordinates: 45.506°N 73.708°W

Quebec electoral district
- Interactive map of riding boundaries from the 2025 federal election

Federal electoral district
- Legislature: House of Commons
MP
Emmanuella Lambropoulos
Liberal
- District created: 1987
- First contested: 1988
- Last contested: 2021
- District webpage: profile, map

Demographics
- Population (2021): 102,104
- Electors (2021): 66,181
- Area (km²): 42.83
- Pop. density (per km²): 2,383.9
- Census division: Montreal
- Census subdivision: Montreal (part)

Saint-Laurent (French: [sɛ̃lɔʁɑ̃]; from 1993 to 2015 Saint-Laurent—Cartierville, Canadian French: [sɛ̃lɔʁɑ̃ kaʁt͡sjevɪl]) is a federal electoral district in Montreal, Quebec, Canada, which has been represented in the House of Commons since 1988.

Since a 2017 by-election triggered by the resignation of longtime Member of Parliament (MP) Stéphane Dion, its MP has been Emmanuella Lambropoulos of the Liberal Party.

== Geography ==
The district used to correspond exactly to the borough of Saint-Laurent in the city of Montreal. However, due to the 2023 redistribution, it now goes all the way up to the south of Acadie boulevard, in the Ahuntsic-Cartierville borough.

The neighbouring ridings are Ahuntsic-Cartierville, Dorval—Lachine—LaSalle, Mount Royal and Pierrefonds—Dollard.

== Demographics ==
According to the 2021 Canadian census, 2023 representation order

Racial groups: 40.7% White, 19.2% Arab, 10.1% Black, 8.6% South Asian, 7.9% Chinese, 3.7% Southeast Asian, 3.2% Latin American, 1.9% Filipino, 1.6% West Asian
Languages: 32.1% French, 20.2% English, 16.0% Arabic, 3.5% Mandarin, 3.2% Spanish, 2.8% Cantonese (Yue), 2.7% Greek, 1.8% Vietnamese, 1.7% Armenian, 1.5% Italian, 1.5% Tamil, 1.3% Romanian, 1.2% Punjabi, 1.1% Persian, 1.1% Urdu
Religions: 45.2% Christian (23.4% Catholic, 9.4% Christian Orthodox, 12.4% Other), 22.8% Muslim, 5.2% Jewish, 3.9% Hindu, 3.4% Buddhist, 18.1% No Religion
Median income: $35,200 (2020)
Average income: $49,760 (2020)

== History ==
The electoral district of Saint-Laurent was created in 1987 from Dollard, Laval-des-Rapides and Saint-Denis. The name was changed to Saint-Laurent—Cartierville in 1989.

This riding lost territory to Ahuntsic-Cartierville during the 2012 electoral redistribution.

Following the 2022 Canadian federal electoral redistribution, the riding gains the territory south of Boul. Acadie and east of Boul. Henri-Bourassa from Ahuntsic-Cartierville.

It was represented since a by-election in 2017 by Emmanuella Lambropoulos, member of the Liberal Party. It has long been regarded as one of the safest Liberal ridings in the nation.

=== Members of Parliament ===
This riding has elected the following members of Parliament:

Parliament	Years	Member	Party
Saint-Laurent; Riding created from Dollard, Laval-des-Rapides and Saint-Denis
34th	1988–1993	Shirley Maheu	Liberal
Saint-Laurent—Cartierville
35th	1993–1996	Shirley Maheu	Liberal
35th	1996–1997	Stéphane Dion	Liberal
36th	1997–2000	Stéphane Dion	Liberal
37th	2000–2004	Stéphane Dion	Liberal
38th	2004–2006	Stéphane Dion	Liberal
39th	2006–2008	Stéphane Dion	Liberal
40th	2008–2011	Stéphane Dion	Liberal
41st	2011–2015	Stéphane Dion	Liberal
Saint-Laurent
42nd	2015–2017	Stéphane Dion	Liberal
42nd	2017–2019	Emmanuella Lambropoulos	Liberal
43rd	2019–2021	Emmanuella Lambropoulos	Liberal
44th	2021–2025	Emmanuella Lambropoulos	Liberal
45th	2025–present	Emmanuella Lambropoulos	Liberal

== Election results ==
=== Saint-Laurent, 2015–present ===
2025 Canadian federal election
Party	Candidate	Votes	%	±%
Liberal	Emmanuella Lambropoulos	26,021	58.89	−0.45
Conservative	Richard Serour	12,477	28.24	+9.92
Bloc Québécois	Marielle Gendron	2,523	5.71	−2.24
New Democratic	Ryan Byrne	1,985	4.49	−6.27
Green	Richard Chambers	693	1.57	+1.46
People's	Manon Chevalier	349	0.79	−2.36
Marxist–Leninist	Fernand Deschamps	137	0.31	−0.06
Total valid votes		44,185	98.52	
Total rejected ballots		663	1.48	-0.23
Turnout		44,848	60.40	+3.52
Eligible voters		74,250		
Liberal notional hold		Swing		−5.19
Source: Elections Canada

2021 federal election redistributed results
Party	Vote	%
Liberal	23,308	59.35
Conservative	7,193	18.31
New Democratic	4,225	10.76
Bloc Québécois	3,122	7.95
People's	1,239	3.15
Marxist-Leninist	146	0.37
Green	42	0.11
Total valid votes	39,275	98.29
Rejected ballots	683	1.71
Registered voters/ estimated turnout	70,248	56.88

2021 Canadian federal election
Party	Candidate	Votes	%	±%	Expenditures
Liberal	Emmanuella Lambropoulos	22,056	59.1	+0.5	$50,070.07
Conservative	Richard Serour	6,902	18.5	+1.1	$5,185.93
New Democratic	Nathan Devereaux	4,059	10.9	+0.8	$2,501.88
Bloc Québécois	Florence Racicot	2,972	8.0	+0.9	$1,649.89
People's	Gregory Yablunovsky	1,182	3.2	+2.0	$1,947.63
Marxist–Leninist	Ginette Boutet	146	0.4	+0.2	$0.00
Total valid votes/expense limit		37,317	98.3	–	$104,997.64
Total rejected ballots		642	1.7		
Turnout		37,959	57.4		
Eligible voters		66,181			
Liberal hold		Swing		-0.3	
Source: Elections Canada

2019 Canadian federal election
Party	Candidate	Votes	%	±%	Expenditures
Liberal	Emmanuella Lambropoulos	23,527	58.6	-0.56	none listed
Conservative	Richard Serour	7,005	17.4	-2.12	$27,597.55
New Democratic	Miranda Gallo	4,065	10.1	+2.3	$1,615.70
Bloc Québécois	Thérèse Miljours	2,845	7.1	+2.19	none listed
Green	Georgia Kokotsis	2,150	5.4	-2.59	$2,581.91
People's	Christopher Mikus	484	1.2	-	none listed
Marxist–Leninist	Ginette Boutet	71	0.2	-	$0.00
Total valid votes/expense limit		40,147	100.0		
Total rejected ballots		618			
Turnout		40,765	59.96		
Eligible voters		67,991			
Liberal hold		Swing		+0.78	
Source: Elections Canada

Canadian federal by-election, April 3, 2017 Resignation of Stéphane Dion
Party	Candidate	Votes	%	±%
Liberal	Emmanuella Lambropoulos	11,461	59.13	−2.44
Conservative	Jimmy Yu	3,784	19.52	+0.01
Green	Daniel Green	1,548	7.99	+5.57
New Democratic	Mathieu Auclair	1,511	7.80	−3.72
Bloc Québécois	William Fayad	951	4.91	+0.25
Rhinoceros	Chinook Blais-Leduc	129	0.67	–
Total valid votes/expense limit		19,384	100.0	–
Total rejected ballots		255	1.30	+0.30
Turnout		19,639	28.33	−30.65
Eligible voters		69,302		
Liberal hold		Swing		−1.24
Source: lop.parl.ca

2015 Canadian federal election: Saint-Laurent
Party	Candidate	Votes	%	±%	Expenditures
Liberal	Stéphane Dion	24,832	61.57	+18.71	$80,361.33
Conservative	Jimmy Yu	7,867	19.51	+0.4	$126,201.23
New Democratic	Alain Ackad	4,646	11.52	-17.55	$12,858.35
Bloc Québécois	Pascal-Olivier Dumas-Dubreuil	1,879	4.66	-1.77	$11,919.73
Green	John Tromp	977	2.42	+0.33	$1,965.89
Marxist–Leninist	Fernand Deschamps	129	0.32	–	-
Total valid votes/		40,330	100.0		$202,992.54
Total rejected ballots		409	0.59	–	
Turnout		40,739	58.98	–	
Eligible voters		69,078			
Source: Elections Canada

2011 federal election redistributed results
Party	Vote	%
Liberal	13,915	42.86
New Democratic	9,437	29.07
Conservative	6,206	19.11
Bloc Québécois	2,089	6.43
Green	680	2.09
Others	140	0.43

=== Saint-Laurent—Cartierville, 1993–2015 ===
2011 Canadian federal election
Party	Candidate	Votes	%	±%	Expenditures
Liberal	Stéphane Dion	17,726	43.43	-18.29	
New Democratic	Maria Ximena Florez	11,948	29.28	+20.30	
Conservative	Svetlana Litvin	7,124	17.46	+0.25	
Bloc Québécois	William Fayad	2,981	7.30	-4.04	
Green	Tim Landry	857	2.10	–	
Marxist–Leninist	Fernand Deschamps	176	0.43	-0.30	
Total valid votes/Expense limit		40,812	100.00		
Total rejected ballots		343	0.83	-0.27	
Turnout		41,155	51.99	-1.56	

2008 Canadian federal election
Party	Candidate	Votes	%	±%	Expenditures
Liberal	Stéphane Dion	25,095	61.72	+1.9	$46,549
Conservative	Dennis Galiatsatos	6,999	17.21	+4.0	$20,864
Bloc Québécois	Jacques Lachaine	4,611	11.34	-3.2	$9,582
New Democratic	Jérôme Rodrigues	3,654	8.98	+1.3	$1,637
Marxist–Leninist	Fernand Deschamps	299	0.73	+0.3	
Total valid votes/Expense limit		40,658	100.00	$83,858	
Total rejected ballots		454	1.10		
Turnout		41,112	53.55		

2006 Canadian federal election
Party	Candidate	Votes	%	±%	Expenditures
Liberal	Stéphane Dion	25,412	59.8	-7.0	$60,159
Bloc Québécois	William Fayad	6,192	14.6	-2.7	$13,260
Conservative	Ishrat Alam	5,590	13.2	+7.0	$62,831
New Democratic	Liz Elder	3,279	7.7	+1.5	$6,611
Green	Gilles Mercier	1,810	4.3	+2.2	$2,560
Marxist–Leninist	Fernand Deschamps	177	0.4	+0.1	
Total valid votes/Expense limit		42,460	100.0	$79,047	

2004 Canadian federal election
Party	Candidate	Votes	%	±%	Expenditures
Liberal	Stéphane Dion	28,107	66.8	-6.8	$57,079
Bloc Québécois	William Fayad	7,261	17.3	+4.2	$10,494
New Democratic	Zaid Mahayni	2,630	6.3	+3.9	$11,340
Conservative	Marc Rahmé	2,606	6.2	-3.2	$10,128
Green	Almaz Aladass	875	2.1	–	$2.67
Marijuana	Alex Neron	298	0.7		
Marxist–Leninist	Fernand Deschamps	125	0.3	-0.2	
Canadian Action	Ken Fernandez	84	0.2	-0.3	$116
Communist	Nilda Vargas	78	0.2	-0.3	$647
Total valid votes/Expense limit		42,064	100.0	$78,192	

Note: Conservative vote is compared to the total of the Canadian Alliance vote and Progressive Conservative vote in 2000 election.

2000 Canadian federal election: Saint-Laurent—Cartierville
Party	Candidate	Votes	%	±%	Expenditures
Liberal	Stéphane Dion	32,861	73.58	+3.44	$44,754
Bloc Québécois	Yves Beauregard	5,838	13.07	+0.35	$11,158
Progressive Conservative	J. Pierre Rouleau	2,308	5.17	−8.74	$876
Alliance	Kaddis R. Sidaros	1,909	4.27	+2.89	$8,762
New Democratic	Piper Elizabeth Huggins	1,070	2.40	+0.56	$908
Marxist–Leninist	Jean-Paul Bedard	234	0.52		$10
Canadian Action	Ken Fernandez	232	0.52		$3,062
Communist	Oscar Chavez	206	0.46		$187
Total valid votes		44,658	100.00		
Total rejected ballots		642			
Turnout		45,300	63.06	−13.90	
Electors on the lists		71,836			
Canadian Alliance percentages are contrasted with the Reform Party figures from 1997. Sources: Official Results, Elections Canada and Financial Returns, Elections Canada.

1997 Canadian federal election: Saint-Laurent—Cartierville
Party	Candidate	Votes	%	±%	Expenditures
Liberal	Stéphane Dion	34,598	70.14	–	$39,617
Progressive Conservative	Jean-Martin Masse	6,861	13.91		$17,038
Bloc Québécois	Yves Beauregard	6,276	12.72		$20,834
New Democratic	Jeff Itcush	910	1.84		$850
Reform	Hagop Karlozian	681	1.38		$1,907
Total valid votes		49,326	100.00		
Total rejected ballots		781			
Turnout		50,107	76.96		
Electors on the lists		65,105			
Sources: Official Results, Elections Canada and Financial Returns, Elections Canada.

Canadian federal by-election, March 25, 1996: Saint-Laurent—Cartierville
Party	Candidate	Votes	%	±%	Expenditures
Liberal	Stéphane Dion	21,336	79.3	+9.5	
Bloc Québécois	Michel Sarra-Bournet	4,000	14.9	-3.8	
Progressive Conservative	G. Garo Toubi	699	13.9	+6.5	
Reform	Shaul Petel	441	1.6		
Independent	Carole Caron	229	0.9		
New Democratic	Sara Mayo	212	0.8	-1.2	
Total valid votes		26,917	100.0%		
Liberal hold		Swing		+6.65	
By-election due to the appointment of Shirley Maheu to the Senate on January 31, 1996.

1993 Canadian federal election
Party	Candidate	Votes	%	±%
Liberal	Shirley Maheu	30,669	69.8	+23.5
Bloc Québécois	Amin Hachem	8,231	18.7	
Progressive Conservative	Mark Weiner	3,254	7.4	-34.1
New Democratic	Francine Poirier	866	2.0	-7.6
Natural Law	José Torres	330	0.8	
National	Roopnarine Singh	274	0.6	
Commonwealth of Canada	Monique Lanctôt	229	0.5	0.2
Abolitionist	Madelaine Piquette-Bedard	103	0.2	
Total valid votes		43,956	100.0	

=== Saint-Laurent, 1988–1993 ===
1988 Canadian federal election
Party	Candidate	Votes	%
Liberal	Shirley Maheu	20,418	46.3
Progressive Conservative	Lyse Hubert-Bennett	18,287	41.5
New Democratic	Sid Ingerman	4,213	9.6
Green	Alain Hickson	765	1.7
Independent	Michelle Dufort	311	0.7
Commonwealth of Canada	Joakim Simon	120	0.3
Total valid votes		44,114	100.0

== See also ==
- List of Canadian electoral districts
- Historical federal electoral districts of Canada
