= Daniel Green (politician) =

Canadian politician

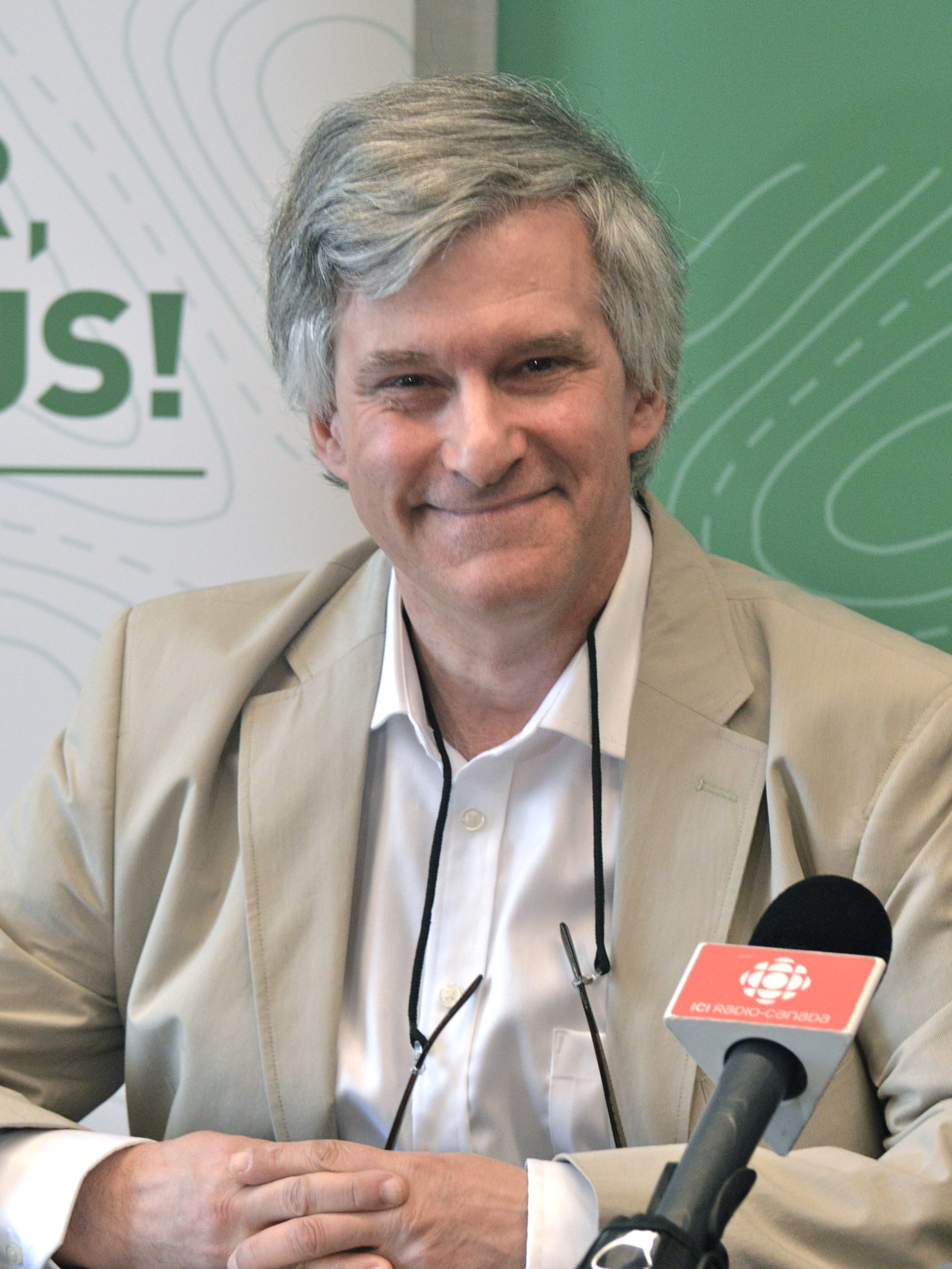
- Green in 2015

Deputy Leader of the Green Party of Canada
- In office December 5, 2014 – 2019 Serving with: Bruce Hyer (2014–18); Jo-Ann Roberts (2018–19)
- Leader: Elizabeth May
- Preceded by: Georges Laraque
- Succeeded by: Vacant

Personal details
- Born: Daniel Green; May 29, 1955 (age 71) Montreal, Quebec, Canada
- Party: Green
- Education: Université du Québec à Montréal
- Profession: Scientific communicator; politician

Daniel Green (born May 29, 1955) is a Canadian politician, environmentalist and scientific communicator. Since 2000, he has been a consultant for Sierra Club of Canada, Société pour vaincre la pollution (SVP), Coalition Eau Secours, the Rivers Foundation, Nature Québec and Parks Canada.

In 2014, Elizabeth May appointed him deputy leader of the Green Party of Canada. He served as deputy leader alongside Jo-Ann Roberts until November 2019, when Roberts became the interim leader of the party.

== Environmental science career ==
A graduate in biological sciences and environmental science from the Université du Québec à Montréal, Green has been working on the problem of toxic substances in the environment since the 1980s. Between 1980 and 2000, he headed Société pour vaincre la pollution (SVP).

Since the early 2000s, Green has acted as the SVP's co-chair and has been vocal against the effect of pollution on public health. Examples of his activism are the asbestos controversy, the trichlorethylene contaminated water case in Shannon, the Lac-Mégantic rail disaster and Montreal REM train project.

== Political career ==
In 2014, Green became a member of the Green Party of Canada. In December 2014, Green Party leader Elizabeth May appointed him deputy leader of the party. He ran in the 2015 Canadian federal election in the new riding of Ville-Marie—Le Sud-Ouest—Île-des-Sœurs. He lost to Liberal candidate Marc Miller.

As part of the Liberal government's plan to reform Canada's electoral system following the 2015 election, Green pushed for the introduction of a proportional voting system, which, in his opinion, would make the electoral process more democratic and more representative. To this end, he sought to show the differences between first-past-the-post voting and proportional representation.

Green ran in a federal by-election in the riding of Saint-Laurent in March 2017, which happened due to former Liberal leader Stéphane Dion's resignation from the House of Commons. He came third behind Liberal candidate Emmanuella Lambropoulos and Conservative candidate Jimmy Yu, winning 8% of the vote. In February 2019, he came third in the federal by-election in Outremont, which happened due to former New Democratic Party leader Tom Mulcair's resignation, with 12.9% of the vote, the best result for the Green Party of Canada in Quebec elections.

== Electoral record ==
2019 Canadian federal election: Outremont
Party	Candidate	Votes	%	±%	Expenditures
Liberal	Rachel Bendayan	19,148	46.19	+5.76	$47,498.81
New Democratic	Andrea Clarke	8,319	20.07	-7.45	none listed
Bloc Québécois	Célia Grimard	5,741	13.85	+2.63	$9,862.60
Green	Daniel Green	5,018	12.1	-0.83	none listed
Conservative	Jasmine Louras	2,707	6.53	+0.39	$4,912.03
People's	Sabin Levesque	369	0.89	-0.65	none listed
Rhinoceros	Mark John Hiemstra	155	0.37		none listed
Total valid votes/expense limit		41,457	100.0	$102,446.50	
Total rejected ballots		455			
Turnout		41,912	62.2		
Eligible voters		67,842			
Liberal hold		Swing		+6.61	
Source: Elections Canada

Canadian federal by-election, February 25, 2019: Outremont Resignation of Tom Mulcair
Party	Candidate	Votes	%	±%
Liberal	Rachel Bendayan	6,086	40.43	+6.97
New Democratic	Julia Sánchez	4,142	27.52	-16.60
Green	Daniel Green	1,946	12.93	+9.32
Bloc Québécois	Michel Duchesne	1,674	11.12	+2.71
Conservative	Jasmine Louras	925	6.14	-3.39
People's	James Seale	232	1.54	-
Independent	William Barrett	48	0.32	-
Total valid votes		15,053	99.11	
Total rejected ballots		135	0.89	-0.08
Turnout		15,188	21.57	-40.35
Eligible voters		70,414		
Liberal gain from New Democratic		Swing		+11.78
Source: Elections Canada

Canadian federal by-election, April 3, 2017: Saint-Laurent Resignation of Stéphane Dion
Party	Candidate	Votes	%	±%
Liberal	Emmanuella Lambropoulos	11,461	59.13	−2.44
Conservative	Jimmy Yu	3,784	19.52	+0.01
Green	Daniel Green	1,548	7.99	+5.57
New Democratic	Mathieu Auclair	1,511	7.80	−3.72
Bloc Québécois	William Fayad	951	4.91	+0.25
Rhinoceros	Chinook Blais-Leduc	129	0.67	–
Total valid votes/expense limit		19,384	100.0	–
Total rejected ballots		255	1.30	+0.30
Turnout		19,639	28.33	−30.65
Eligible voters		69,302		
Liberal hold		Swing		−1.24
Source: lop.parl.ca

2015 Canadian federal election: Ville-Marie–Le Sud-Ouest–Île-des-Sœurs
Party	Candidate	Votes	%	±%	Expenditures
Liberal	Marc Miller	25,491	50.82	+23.34	$104,027.97
New Democratic	Allison Turner	11,757	23.44	-18.05	$76,667.01
Conservative	Steve Shanahan	5,948	11.86	-0.05	$10,419.44
Bloc Québécois	Chantal St-Onge	4,307	8.59	-7.44	$2,334.04
Green	Daniel Green	2,398	4.78	+1.99	$84,091.06
Rhinoceros	Daniel Wolfe	161	0.32	–	–
Communist	Bill Sloan	102	0.20	–	–
Total valid votes/expense limit		50,164	100.00	–	$221,982.87
Total rejected ballots		435	0.86	–	–
Turnout		50,599	59.96	–	–
Eligible voters		84,387	–	–	–
Source: Elections Canada
