= Rivers Foundation (Canada) =

The Rivers Foundation (Canada) (French: Fondation Rivières) is a Quebec-based environmental organization created on November 26, 2002, "to preserve the rivers threatened by electric dam projects, pollution, privatisation and various economic interests." The Rivers Foundation purposes to raise public awareness on this subject in order for Quebecers to manage their rivers and protect these water reservoirs.

Its administrative office is located in Montreal, Quebec. One of its founders and its co-president is actor Roy Dupuis.
