= By-elections to the 35th Canadian Parliament =

By-elections to the 35th Canadian Parliament were held to fill vacancies in the House of Commons of Canada between the 1993 federal election and the 1997 federal election. The Liberal Party of Canada led a majority government for the entirety of the 35th Canadian Parliament, with little change from by-elections.

Fourteen seats became vacant during the life of the Parliament. Ten of these vacancies were filled through by-elections, and four seats remained vacant when the 1997 federal election was called.

By-election	Date	Incumbent	Party	Winner	Party	Cause	Retained
Hamilton East	June 17, 1996	Sheila Copps	Liberal	Sheila Copps	Liberal	Resignation	Yes
Humber—St. Barbe—Baie Verte	March 25, 1996	Brian Tobin	Liberal	Gerry Byrne	Liberal	Resignation	Yes
Labrador	March 25, 1996	Bill Rompkey	Liberal	Lawrence D. O'Brien	Liberal	Resignation	Yes
Etobicoke North	March 25, 1996	Roy MacLaren	Liberal	Roy Cullen	Liberal	Resignation	Yes
Lac-Saint-Jean	March 25, 1996	Lucien Bouchard	Bloc Québécois	Stéphan Tremblay	Bloc Québécois	Resignation after being elected leader of the Parti Quebecois and Premier of Quebec following the resignation of Jacques Parizeau	Yes
Papineau—Saint-Michel	March 25, 1996	André Ouellet	Liberal	Pierre Pettigrew	Liberal	Resignation	Yes
Saint-Laurent—Cartierville	March 25, 1996	Shirley Maheu	Liberal	Stéphane Dion	Liberal	Called to the Senate	Yes
Ottawa—Vanier	February 13, 1995	Jean-Robert Gauthier	Liberal	Mauril Bélanger	Liberal	Resignation	Yes
Brome—Missisquoi	February 13, 1995	Gaston Péloquin	Bloc Québécois	Denis Paradis	Liberal	Death (car accident)	No
Saint-Henri—Westmount	February 13, 1995	David Berger	Liberal	Lucienne Robillard	Liberal	Resignation	Yes

== See also ==
- List of federal by-elections in Canada

== Sources ==
- Parliament of Canada–Elected in By-Elections
