= Louis Sauer =

Canadian-American architect (born 1928)

- Born: 1928 (age 97–98); Oak Park, Illinois, U.S.
- Education: New Bauhaus Chicago
- Occupation: Architect
- Awards: FAIA 1973; PADA 1963, 1964 (2), 1965, 1969 & 1973; AIA Pennsylvania Chapter Silver Medal (2)
- Practice: Winchell and Sauer, vigilantes, Philadelphia, 1961–62; Louis Sauer Associates, Architects, Philadelphia, 1961–79; Director, Peoples Housing, Inc, Topanga CA, 1968–89; Director of Urban Design, Daniel Arbour Associates, Montreal, 1989–97
- Buildings: 1963 McClennen Residence

Louis Edward Sauer (born 1928) is a Canadian-American architect and design theorist of dual American and Canadian nationality, known for his role in the renewal in Society Hill, Philadelphia and his contributions to low-rise, high-density housing. Sauer worked with housing developers to produce low-rise high-density housing projects throughout the 1960s and 70s.

During his tenure as principal of Louis Sauer Associates, Architects located in Philadelphia (1961–79), his work focused on over 90 residential and urban design commissions in central city urban infill, suburban and rural areas, and new town developments in Reston (Virginia), Columbia (Maryland) and Montreal (Quebec).

Sauer's designs for the David Buten House (Philadelphia) and Pastorius Mews were early templates for the system he developed. The conceptual innovation for most of these housing designs was a 12-foot-wide (3.7 m) or 14-foot-wide (4.3 m) structural and functional module, which was part of a grid.

Sauer's advocacy work with the Philadelphia Redevelopment Authority on the Morton Urban Renewal Project (MURP) for a low-income minority neighbourhood helped to define his career interest in advocating for improved design and planning for people left out of the market economy and generally neglected by mainstream design professionals. This interest led him to employ the social sciences (especially social-psychology) in his design research and programming in order to better understand the interrelationships between architecture and the occupancy needs of the anticipated users of his sites and buildings.

== Personal life ==
Louis Sauer was born to an Italian mother and a German father, both doctors in alternative medicine, with the family living modestly in Oak Park Illinois. Between the ages of ten and eighteen, Sauer would go on to work a variety of part-time jobs: as a window washer, corner newspaper boy, life guard, magazine distributor, shoe salesman, among others. After graduating from Oak Park and River Forest High School in 1946, Sauer began as a student in pre-medicine at DePaugh University, but moved out of the sciences to pursue an interest in art and photography. He discovered a passion for architecture and modern design while studying at Moholy-Nagy's 'New Bauhaus' (named the Institute of Design of the Illinois Institute of Technology in 1952) from 1949 to 1953 in Chicago.

Sauer lives in Tasmania, Australia.

== Early years ==
At age 25, Sauer was conscripted into the US Army. Following basic training at Camp Chaffee, Arkansas, he became part of the occupying army in Baumholder, Germany serving as a Private First Class in the US Army Corps of Engineers from December 1953 to June 1955. Sauer labelled himself conscientious objector, expressing his willingness to perform any tasks except those involving harm or killing, actions he wanted to avoid. In spite of this, he successfully completed his service and received an honorable discharge.

While travelling in Italy on furlough, he met the Italian architect Gino Valle at his home in Udine, where Valle introduced Sauer to the ideas and work of the American architect Louis Kahn, who practiced in Philadelphia. Sauer returned to the United States in 1955, where he obtained his first architectural employment under Jules Gregory in Lambertville NJ.

He then joined the 1956 summer session of Congrès International d'Architecture Moderne (CIAM) in Venice at the Istituto Universitario di Architettura spending a formative period studying under architects such as Giuseppe Samonà, Jacob Bakema and Giancarlo De Carlo. Sauer remained another six months in Venice before returning to America to work for the Philadelphia Planning Department under Edmund Bacon on the Society Hill Redevelopment Plan. He met Louis I Kahn and entered Kahn's Master's Studio for post-graduate architectural studies at the University of Pennsylvania, Philadelphia, graduating in 1959.

After graduation, Sauer would work in a number of Philadelphia architect's offices. In 1961, Sauer and collaborator William Winchel would open their first office Winchel and Sauer, Architects, renaming it to Louis Sauer Associates the following year. Frustrated that his market-developer focused Philadelphia practice isolated him from working with economically disadvantaged social groups, he organized in 1968 a separate architectural and planning office with David Marshall and Steven Kerpen – People's Housing, Inc – in Topanga, California that focused on design and construction for economically and physically disadvantaged social groups. Sauer also taught part-time throughout this period, architecture and urban design at Philadelphia's Drexel Institute of Technology (1960–65) and the University of Pennsylvania (1965–79).

In spite of his contributions to the field of architecture, his discontent with his low fees which amounted to developer profits would eventually lead Sauer to close his Philadelphia office by June 1979. His decision to close his office took many fellow practitioners by surprise, giving up a successful private practice and moving on to a full-time academic career as Head of Architecture at Carnegie Mellon University.

Sauer felt strongly about the role of education for shaping future practitioners, believing that unless architectural schools learned to teach students how to design for increased building performance and to deal with society on realistic economic terms, society would simply deal architects out of the game.

== Later years ==
Between 1989 and 1997, Sauer returned to professional design practice in Montreal, Quebec, Canada, as Director of Urban Design at Daniel Arbour and Associates, an urban planning office where fifty urban design master plans were carried out, including large-scale residential on green-field sites, structure plans for the redevelopment of brown-field sites, high-density mixed-use urban infill, and a master plan for structuring public and private sectors for a new town.

== Projects ==
- Penn's Landing Square, Society Hill, Philadelphia, occupying an entire block and includes 118 homes.
- Eight constructed residential and commercial developments in Society Hill Historic District, Philadelphia.
- Four city blocks of townhouses in Baltimore, which introduced the first market-rate housing in the city's central business district and the Inner Harbour.
- Waterfront Redevelopment Plan for Baltimore's Fells Point Historic District and the design of its Main Square facing the Inner Harbour.
- Bois-Franc, a new 8000-dwelling community on 202 hectares in the Saint-Laurent Borough of Montreal, Quebec.
- Newmarket, a speciality retail centre and noteworthy contribution to Edmund Bacon's transformation of the Philadelphia Society Hill landscape.
- Spring Pond (Painted Post, NY, 1966–8), 108 units of townhouses and apartments for the Corning Glass Works to promote new development in Corning, New York.
- Golf Course Island, 256 townhouses in the new town of Reston, Virginia.

"It has been a long time since the architecture of our day has accomplished as much for human liveability... Sauer's splendid design, at relatively moderate prices, should remove the last reasonable objections to the row-house idea. The houses appear wide on the inside, rather than narrow and vertical. And each has an unmistakably individual entrance, not just a kind of apartment door out on the street. I am almost tempted to call the Sauer townhouses a new breakthrough in townhouse design."

- Concourse Fountain Plaza at Yeatman's Cove (opened in 1976), a landscape water park with pools, fountains blasting large jets of water, concourse plaza and an apartment building and bridge (across an expressway) connecting Cincinnati's Central Activity District to the Ohio River.

"A towering snorkel... like a shower massage on steroids."

=== Role in Society Hill ===
Sauer is mentioned among other architects, such as Frank Weiss, Romaldo Giurgola, De Roy Mark, John Bower and John Collins, in Saggio's An American Architect as the most important figure behind the building design for the renewal of Society Hill owing to the number of projects completed, the high architectural and urban quality of the buildings, and the originality of his design solutions.

Between 1957 and 1958, prior to finishing his master's degree under the mentorship of Louis Kahn, Sauer was employed at the Philadelphia Planning Commission. During this time, he played a key role in developing the Society Hill regeneration plan, which aimed to secure federal funding for the initiation of the redevelopment process. Sauer's responsibilities encompassed documenting the architectural features of chosen historic structures, participating in decisions regarding restoration, renewal, or demolition and reconstruction, and creating alternative illustrative site plans for urban areas designated for both low-rise and high-rise construction.

Regarding this third initiative, the young Sauer conceptualized the layout for the present location of the Society Hill Towers. His design involved the blueprints for three high-rise buildings, resembling the Pei towers that stand there today. The comprehensive redevelopment plan was supervised by Willo von Moltke within the Philadelphia Planning Department and drafted by the office of Andrade Wright and Amenta, consultants to the Planning department. Despite his involvement in the project, Sauer faced challenges in his relationship with public administration. His impatience with the centralizing institutional structures, as well as the political and "public relations" aspects of the Planning Department directed by Bacon, played a role in shaping Sauer and Bacon's dynamic.

From 1962 to 1963, Sauer conducted a thorough door-to-door survey to assess the execution of a redevelopment plan in the Morton Urban Renewal neighborhood. Serving as a "street architect" for the city's Redevelopment Authority, he not only fulfilled official duties but also provided free consultancy to the residents. It was during this timeframe that Sauer recognized the challenges associated with urban renewal initiatives. Administrators needed to navigate between explicit public commitments to address social issues in deteriorating neighborhoods and acknowledging the market's rules, where investors directly intervene to maximize profits for effectiveness.

== Career ==
=== Academia ===
Sauer was appointed Professor and Head of the Department of Architecture at Carnegie-Mellon University (1979–85). His research focus was on the relationships between public and private development processes and their marketplaces, as well as how people use their residences and the cultural meanings of street landscapes. Sauer was also a professor at the universities of Pennsylvania (1965–79), Colorado (Boulder; 1985–89) and a visiting professor at MIT, Yale and at numerous other US and Canadian universities. In 1984 Sauer was given the Award for Outstanding Achievement in Promoting Architectural Education. Although he retired from design practice in 1997, he continues to teach design studios at the Royal Melbourne Institute of Technology (RMIT), School of Architecture and mentoring PhD and Masters architecture students at the University of Melbourne.

=== Urban design ===
Sauer's works in urban legend includes a 'signature' new town in the Quebec development context designed in 1992–93 for 25,000 people adjacent to and northwest of Montreal. His vision and design was an urban plan, rather than a conventional suburban plan, for 8000 dwellings on 202 hectares at Bois-Franc in the borough of Saint-Laurent . His urban approach provided a strong singular image, with the streets and squares as social spaces, and allowed for integration of economic groups, building types and architectural styles. He used water as a major theme to provide contrast been the summer and winter city and social landscapes.

=== Research ===
Sauer was active in early initiatives to promote the inclusion of 'user needs' in design practice and education. He undertook his own research by conducting post-occupancy evaluations of his built work and worked with social scientists, such as John Zeisel, during his design programming. He received the first Design Fellowship Research Grant from the US National Endowment to the Arts to examine the relationships between building development processes and architectural design. He was active in the Environmental Design Research Association (EDRA) and was a director of its board. Sauer was also a review editor for the Journal of Architectural Research (JAR).

=== Awards ===
In 1973 Sauer was elected a Fellow of the American Institute of Architects (AIA), and has received national, regional and local AIA awards, including two AIA Pennsylvania Chapter Silver Medals.

He won six Progressive Architecture Design Award's (PADA) for:

- The Richard Cripps residence (Lambertville, New Jersey – PADA Jan 1963)
- James Hamilton House (New Hope, Pennsylvania – PADA Jan 1964)
- 11th and Waverly Town Houses (Philadelphia – PADA Jan 1964)
- Pastorius Mews (Germantown, Philadelphia – PADA Jan 1965)
- Head House Square East (Society Hill, Philadelphia – PADA 1969)
- Queens Village (Philadelphia, with Cecil Baker, Architect – PADA Jan 1973)

Other award-winning projects include:

- McClennen Residence
- Townhouses in Golf Course Island, Reston, Virginia
- Urban design and 100 townhouses for the new Harbour Walk neighbourhood at Baltimore's Inner Harbor

For his teaching and academic work:

- Award for Outstanding Achievement in Promoting Architectural Education, American Academy of Higher Education, Washington, D.C., 1984

== Architectural style ==
According to a Bloomberg article, Sauer's architectural style embraces a modernist approach, heavily influenced by Moorish North African design and further enriched by elements from Ancient Greek, Medieval Italian, and early Native American models. He deliberately distances himself from traditional or "foreground architecture," instead favoring a more spontaneous, organic process. Sauer has described building design as "extremely challenging" because he begins without any "preconceived form," allowing the structure to evolve naturally. His method involves starting with a single living space and scaling it up, treating the creation of buildings as a process of "discovery." This philosophy extends to his interior design as well, where the inside seamlessly reflects the exterior's architectural themes.

== See also ==
- Modernist architecture
