= True North Detroit =

Experimental community in Detroit, Michigan

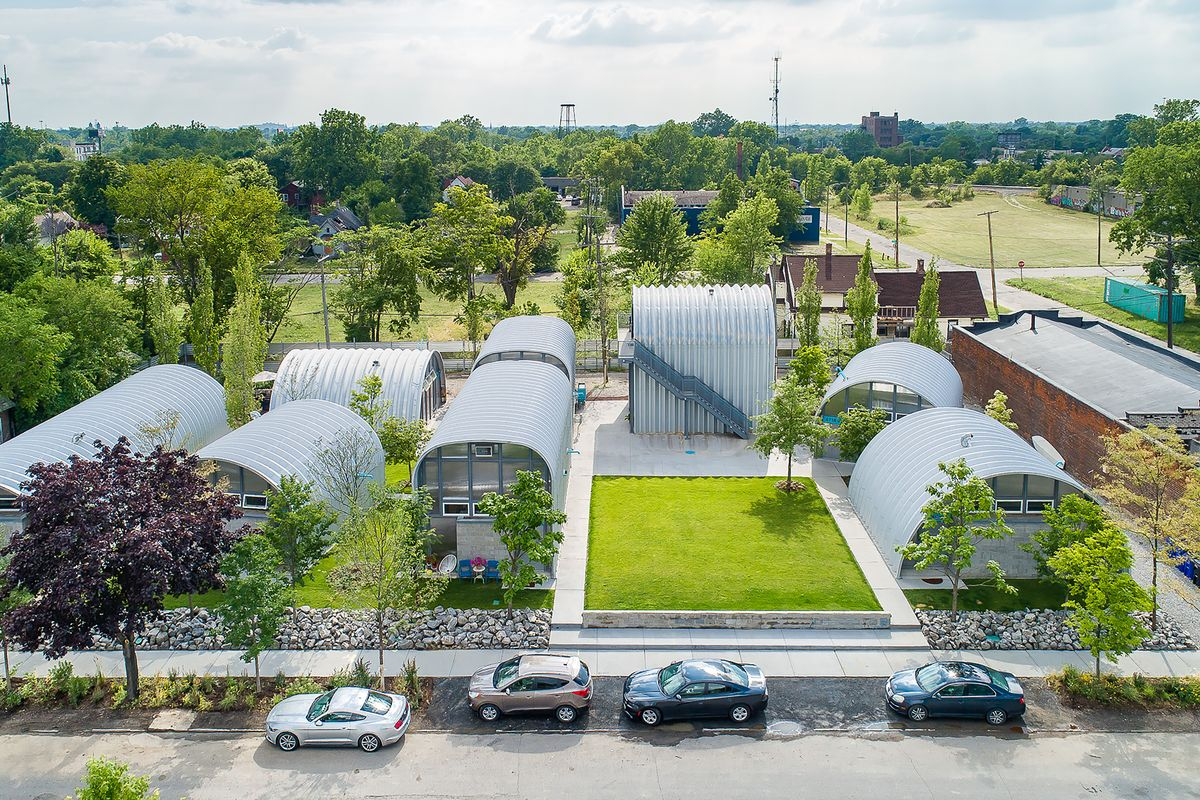
- Aerial view of True North, June 2018

- Location within Michigan

General information
- Type: Residential Community
- Location: 4699 - 4719 16th St, Detroit, Michigan, U.S.
- Coordinates: 42.347753°N 83.088393°W
- Construction started: October 2016
- Opening: May 2017
- Cost: $1.6 million
- Landlord: Prince Concepts

Design and construction
- Architect: EC3
- Developer: Philip Kafka

Website
- truenorthdetroit.com

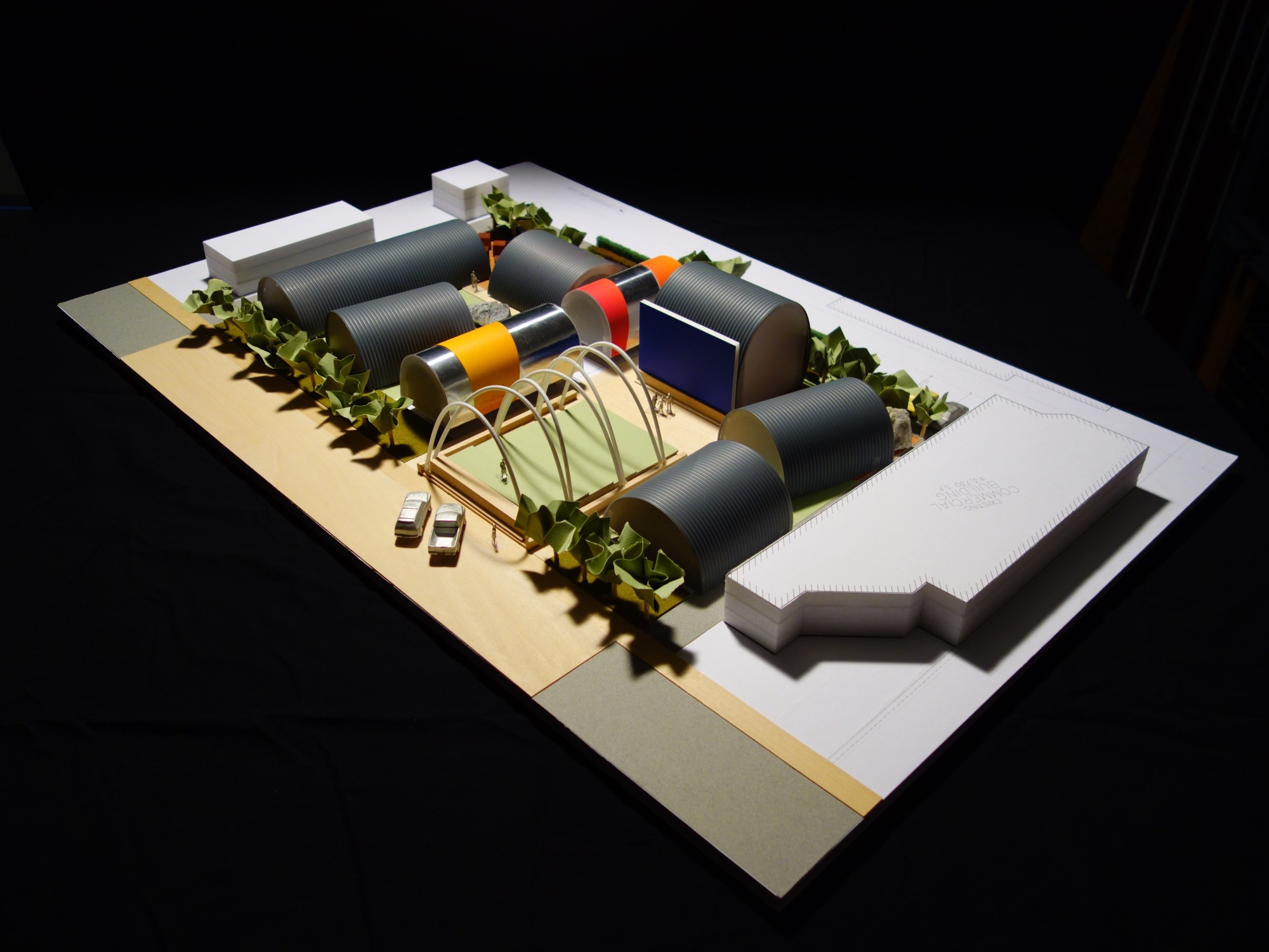
A Model of True North Detroit made by EC3, the studio of Edwin Chan.

True North Detroit is an experimental live/work community in Detroit, Michigan, United States. The project is located at the corner of 16th St and Hancock St in Detroit, MI. It was the first development in an area of Detroit that hadn't seen development since the 1960s.

== Background ==
In 2013, Philip Kafka began purchasing land and buildings at the intersection of Grand River and Warren. Kafka always had the intention to develop in the area, and in 2015, he sold his company in New York and began working on True North. The project is situated across five residential lots in Detroit, MI; when purchased by Kafka they were overgrown and garbage ridden. The project site is located in an area that had not seen commercial development since the 1960s.

Kafka approached Above The Fold, a talent agency representing architects, with the idea to build a residential community using Quonset huts. Above The Fold founder, John Patrick recommended a few architects and Kafka decided on Edwin Chan, principal of EC3. Prior to working on True North Detroit, Chan was the design director at Gehry Partners with his most notable design projects being the Guggenheim Museum in Bilbao, Spain and the Foundation Louis Vuitton Museum in Paris, France.

== Reception ==
True North Detroit had 500 rental applications for just 10 Live/Work spaces. The community has received notable attention, and continues to win significant awards.

True North was completed in May 2017, and has been fully occupied by a community of artists and creatives since completion. The project has also won significant architectural awards. The project took just 8 months to build, with Kafka living onsite, and serving as the General Contractor.

Winner of a Progressive Architecture award given by Architect Magazine each year; in addition, True North Detroit was featured on the cover of Architect Magazine's February 2017 issue

Architect's Newspaper, "Multi-Family Development of the Year, 2017"

One of Six Finalists for the Mies Crown Hall Americas Award, 2018.

== General ==
True North was created using traditional style Quonset Huts purchased from SteelMaster Buildings in Virginia Beach.
