= James Dupre =

James Dupre, or variants, may refer to:

- James Du Pré (1778–1870), an English politician
- James Dupré, American singer, contestant in The Voice (American season 9)
- James Dupree (born 1950), American artist, educator, and activist
