= Bois-Franc =

Bois-Franc or Bois-Francs can refer to the following places, all in Quebec, Canada:

- Bois-Franc, Quebec, a municipality
- Bois-Franc, Montreal, a neighbourhood
- Bois-Francs, an alternate name for Centre-du-Québec region
