= LaurenHill Academy =

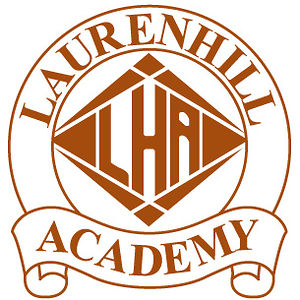

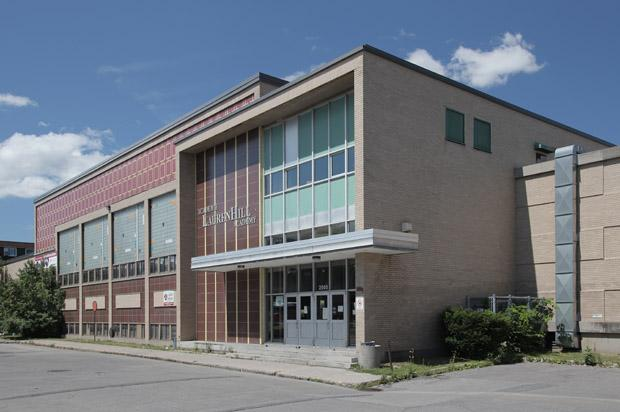

Location
- Saint-Laurent, Quebec, Quebec; Canada; 45.5035°N 73.6973°W

Information
- Type: English-language public school
- Motto: Ita, existimus.
- Established: 1992
- Principal: Donna Manos https://az184419.vo.msecnd.net/emsb/emsb-website/en/docs/2022-2023/list-of-schools-22-23.pdf
- Teaching staff: http://www.laurenhill.emsb.qc.ca/Documents/2021-2022%20Documents/Senior%20Campus%20Staff%20List.pdf http://www.laurenhill.emsb.qc.ca/Documents/2021-2022%20Documents/Junior%20Campus%20staff%20lists%202021.pdf
- Grades: 7 to 11
- Enrollment: 1178
- Colours: White, Black, Burgundy
- Mascot: LHA Lynx
- Affiliations: English Montreal School Board
- Website: www.emsb.qc.ca/laurenhill

LaurenHill Academy (LHA; French: Académie LaurenHill) is an English-language public school in Saint-Laurent, Quebec, Canada. It opened in the fall of 1992, after the closure of St. Laurent High School and Sir Winston Churchill High School, which was built in 1961. Formerly part of the Protestant School Board of Greater Montreal, the school has been part of the English Montreal School Board since the 1998–99 school year. In 1999, the neighbouring Father McDonald High School was closed, and for the 1999-2000 school year LaurenHill Academy took over the location and divided itself into Junior and Senior Campuses.

LaurenHill Academy was the first school in the EMSB to use a progressive block scheduling system (4 daily periods of 75 minutes over a 9-day cycle). In recognition of this innovation, LaurenHill achieved Lead School status and was invited to join the MEQ Implementation Design Committee's Lead School Network. In 2009 their art teacher, Sharon Erskine, received the Canadian Art Educator of the Year Award for the high school level.

Both its male and female sports teams compete as the LaurenHill Lynx.

Enrollment was slightly below 1200 students in Secondary I, II, III, IV and V in the 2019–2020 academic year.

At LaurenHill, students can enroll in three French programs, Regular (français langue seconde), français immersion and français langue d'enseignement.

LaurenHill Academy has a multicultural population of students with a wide variety of abilities. Its basketball teams and the LaurenHill Jazz Band have recently won several awards. For many years now, its science students have won medals, including gold at the Montreal Regional Science Fair.

LHA's academic ranking is 10th among Montreal public high schools, according to Fraser Institute ratings from 2006. In 2019, it ranked 201st among a total of 473 public and private schools in Quebec.
