= Low-rise high-density =

Type of residential development

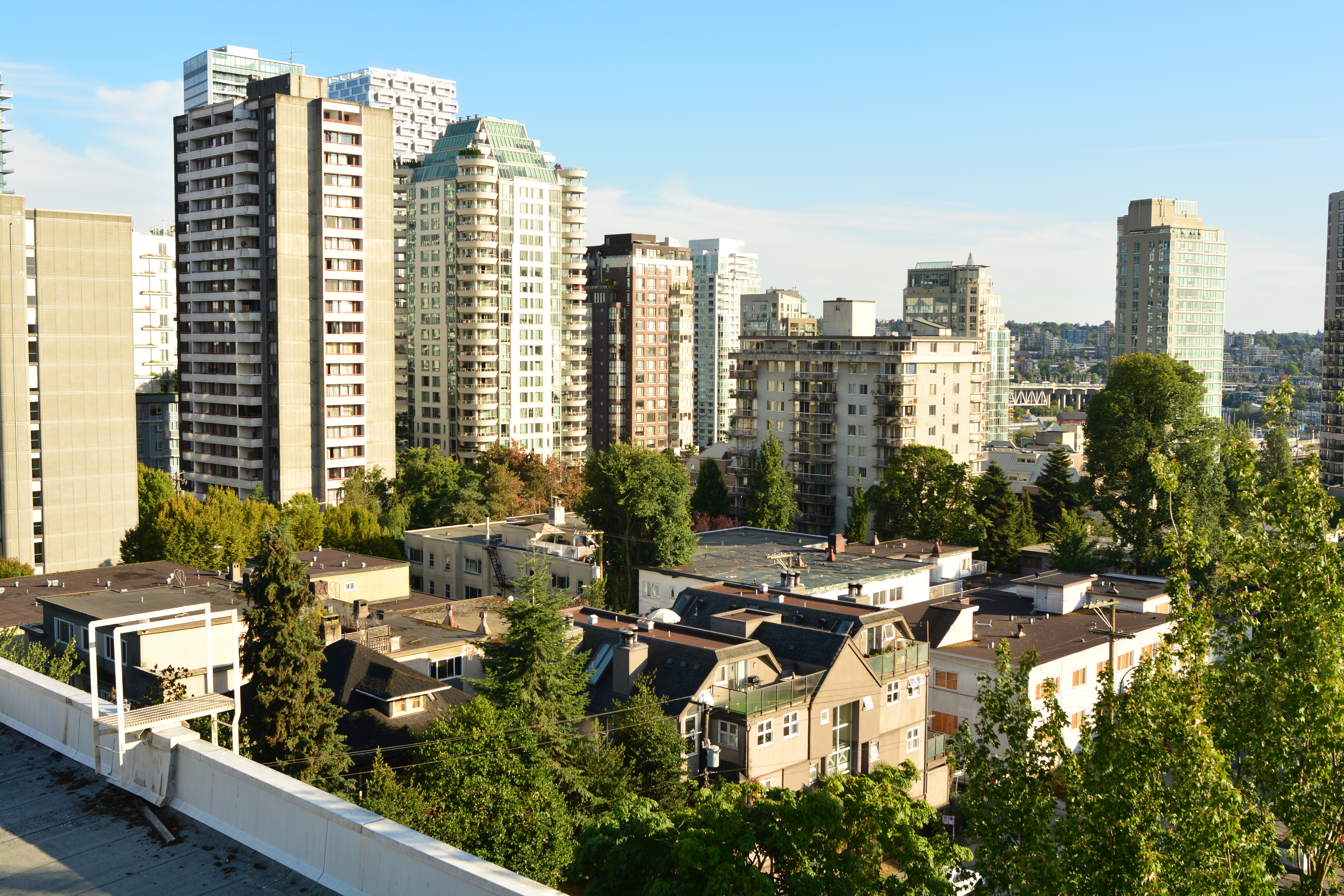
Low-rise buildings in Vancouver

Low-rise high-density housing refers to residential developments which are typically 4 stories or less in height, have a high number of housing units per acre of land, and have between 35-80 dwellings per hectare. This housing type is thought to provide a middle ground between detached single-family homes and high-rise apartment buildings.

== Background ==
=== Origins and Early Developments ===
Although the concept of low-rise high-density housing can be traced back to Le Corbusier's unbuilt Roq et Rob project from 1949, a more direct influence was the pioneering work of the Swiss firm Atelier 5, whose Siedlung Halen project built in Bern, Switzerland in 1955-61 became a seminal example of the typology.

=== Rise in popularity during the 1960s and 70s ===
In the 1960s and 1970s, low-rise high-density housing gained popularity among architects as a reaction to the perceived social failures of high-rise "tower-in-the-park" public housing projects. Architects and planners began to rethink and reintroduce this housing model as a way to combine the benefits of urban and suburban living.

== Characteristics ==
- Low-rise buildings' height, often 2-4 stories, intended to maintain a human-scaled, "homelike" environment
- High number of housing units packed into a relatively small land area, creating density
- Incorporation of shared common spaces and amenities to offset smaller private living spaces
- Integration with walkable, transit-oriented neighborhoods to reduce car dependency
- Ability to be built in existing urban areas without major ecosystem destruction

== Main proponents ==
The low-rise, high-density approach has regained popularity as an alternative to suburban sprawl and high-rise housing, offering a way to create density while providing a sense of community and connection to the ground.

Le Corbusier: His Roq et Rob project in 1949 is considered an early influence on the low-rise, high-density approach.

Atelier 5: The Swiss architecture firm designed Siedlung Halen in Bern, Switzerland from 1959-61, which is considered the most influential low-rise, high-density project of the 1960s.

The New York State Urban Development Corporation (UDC): In 1973, the UDC, along with the Institute for Architecture and Urban Studies, presented the Marcus Garvey Park Village project in Brownsville, Brooklyn and the Another Chance for Housing: Low Rise Alternatives exhibition at the Museum of Modern Art. This showcased a future for housing in the U.S. that combined urban and suburban living benefits.

Seven young architecture firms: Engaged by the UDC to further develop the low-rise, high-density prototype presented at MoMA, drawing from the pioneering work of architects like Atelier 5.

Contemporary architects and researchers: Figures like Karen Kubey, exhibitor of Suburban Alternatives, which traced the typology of low-rise, high-density housing over time, advocates for this approach.

== Benefits of Low-Rise High-Density ==
The aim of this housing model is to deliver the benefits of density, such as supporting public services and reducing environmental impact, while still providing residents with a sense of community and individual identity more typical of single-family homes. Studies have found that low-rise high-density developments have several potential benefits:

- Increasing property values in the surrounding area
- Attracting new businesses and employers to the community
- Reducing urban decay by repurposing unused buildings
- Decreasing overall energy consumption and carbon emissions compared to low-density sprawl

== Challenges and Considerations ==
While low-rise high-density housing is seen as a valuable alternative to high-rise towers, it presents several challenges:

- Overcoming regulatory constraints and zoning that favors single-family homes
- Addressing resident perceptions and preferences for detached housing
- Carefully planning maintenance costs and sinking funds to avoid disrepair
- Integrating the developments seamlessly into existing neighborhoods

== Examples ==
- The low-rise high-density housing projects built in the London borough of Camden between 1965-1973 stood in contrast to the post-war high-rise models, aiming to create a more "homelike" and human-scaled environment for residents.
- In 2021, Minneapolis eliminated single-family zoning and permitted the construction of duplexes, triplexes, and fourplexes on all residential lots throughout the city, with the goal of increasing housing supply and affordability.

== Advocacy and Criticism ==
Advocates of low-rise, high-density architecture argue that this type of development can provide an effective "missing middle" between low-density suburbs and high-rise towers. 3-7 story mid-rise buildings, often in a perimeter block configuration with a central courtyard, are cited as an example of this "missing middle" that can enable walkable neighborhoods with multiple different uses and housing types. Proponents suggest that this medium-density approach can achieve higher densities without the perceived downsides of high-rise towers, such as limited access to outdoor space, reduced community cohesion, and higher maintenance costs. Mid-rise, medium-density development is more common in Europe than in North America and Australia, where urban development has tended towards either low-density suburbs or high-rise towers

Criticisms or challenges associated with low-rise, high-density architecture include:

- Difficulty Achieving Density Targets: low-rise, high-density housing can be an effective "missing middle" between low-density suburbs and high-rise towers, but achieving the desired density levels may be challenging. The Residences at Sandford Lodge project in Ireland is cited as achieving around 100 units per hectare, which is comparable to taller apartment buildings, but this may not always be the case.
- Potential Overlooking and Privacy Issues: The Sandford Lodge project is noted for addressing issues of overlooking adjoining properties and privacy through its design, but this may not be universal among low-rise, high-density developments. Ensuring adequate privacy and separation between units can be a design challenge.
- Lack of Contemporary Scholarship: Low-rise, high-density housing has been an under-examined typology and has had limited contemporary scholarship and examples compared to single-family homes or high-rise developments.
- Halting of Prototype Development: The New York State Urban Development Corporation's efforts to further develop low-rise, high-density prototypes were halted in the 1970s due to policy changes.
- Economic Factors and Public Perception: Architect Michael Pyatok has discussed the economic factors influencing low-rise, high-density housing and need to "charm the public" in order to make it appealing, implying potential resistance or skepticism from the public.

== See also ==
- Low-rise building
- Louis Sauer
- Postmodernism architecture
