= Anthony Lukca =

Canadian football player (born 1986)

Profile
- Positions: Defensive back, Long snapper

Personal information
- Born: May 11, 1986 (age 40); Saint-Laurent, Quebec, Canada
- Listed height: 5 ft 9 in (1.75 m)
- Listed weight: 210 lb (95 kg)

Career information
- University: McGill Redmen
- CFL draft: 2009: undrafted

Career history
- 2010: Toronto Argonauts*
- * Offseason or practice squad member only
- Stats at CFL.ca

Anthony Lukca (born May 11, 1986) is a Canadian former football defensive back. He went undrafted in the 2009 CFL draft.

Anthony attended McGill University and graduated in Spring 2010 with a degree in Physical Education, having played CIS football for the McGill Redmen for 5 years. In 2009, he won an athletic excellence bursary from the Montreal Alouettes, having led the nation in tackles in 2007. With McGill, he achieved 209 tackles, 3 sacks, 7 interceptions and forced 10 fumbles in 35 games played. He is currently the Head Coach, Defensive Coordinator, Linebacker, and Longsnapper coach for Selwyn House Gryphons Juvenile (Varsity) Football Team. Lukca is also Head Coach of the elementary school's hockey teams, and coaches flag football in the spring.

On 10 June 2010, he signed with the Toronto Argonauts. He was later released by the Argonauts on June 20, 2010.

In January, 2011, he signed with the Centaures of Grenoble, France, as running back and strong safety.

While at McGill University, he mainly played defensive back and strong side linebacker.
