= James Dupree =

American artist, educator, and activist

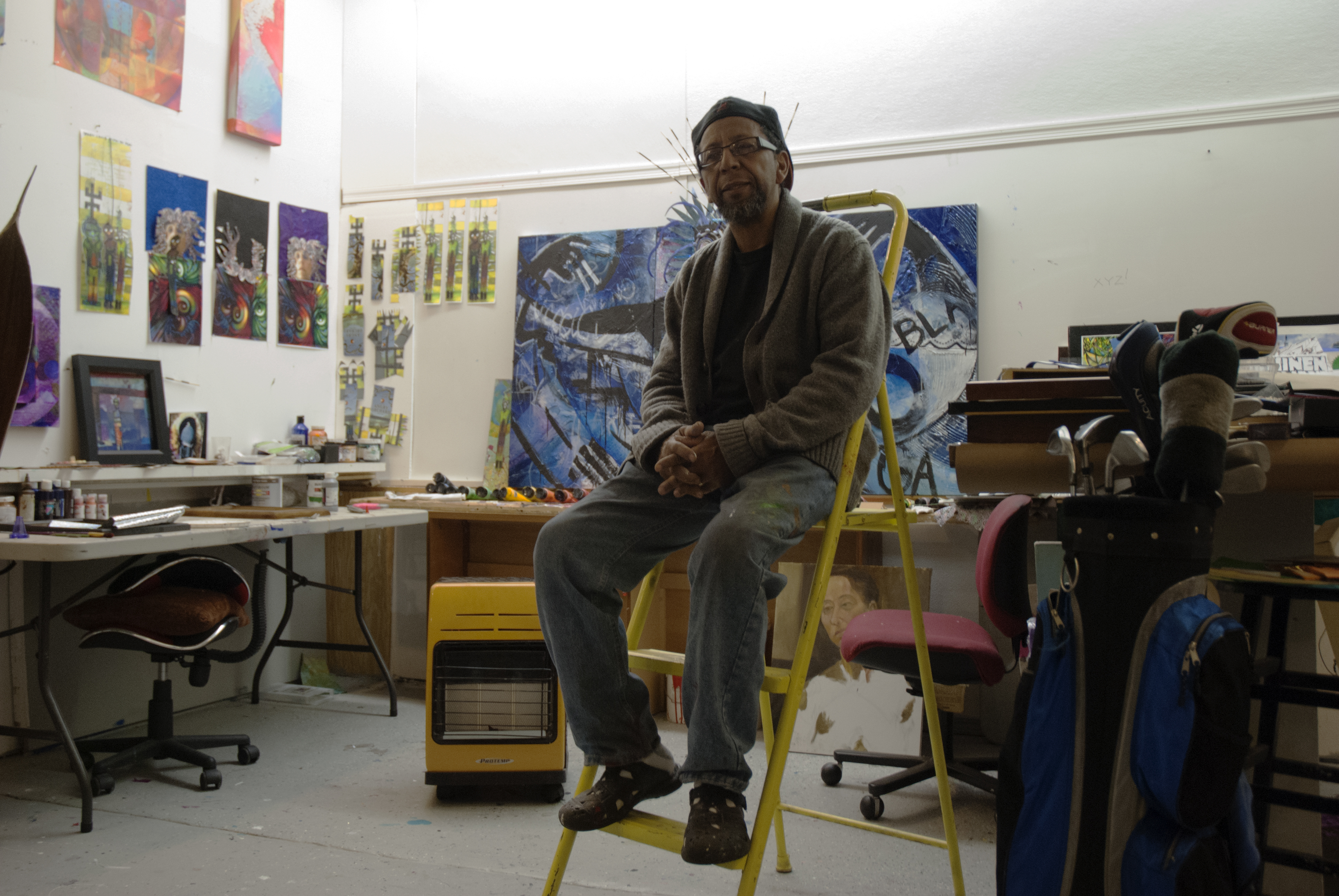
- Born: 1950 (age 75–76); Pittsburgh, Pennsylvania, United States
- Education: Columbus College of Art and Design, Pennsylvania Academy of the Fine Arts, University of Pennsylvania
- Known for: Painting; arts education; activism
- Website: www.JamesDupreeArt.com

External videos
- “James E. Dupree”, BrandywineWorkshop, 2011
- “Philly Artist Fights City Hall Over Eminent Domain Abuse”, ReasonTV, 2013

James Dupree (born 1950) is an American artist, educator, and activist. He has received both fellowships and artist's residencies in Pennsylvania, New York, Massachusetts, and Wales, as well as various awards, including the Living Legend Award of the Black Alumni Society of the University of Pennsylvania. From 2012 to 2014, Dupree Studios in the Mantua community of West Philadelphia was the subject of an eminent domain takeover attempt by the Philadelphia Redevelopment Authority (PRA), which ended with Dupree keeping his studio.

== Education ==
James Dupree was born in 1950 in Pittsburgh, Pennsylvania, and spent parts of his childhood in Philadelphia, Pittsburgh, and Bridgeville, Pennsylvania. As a child, he attended free classes at the Fleisher Art Memorial in Philadelphia. Dupree received a full scholarship to Columbus College of Art and Design, where he received his Bachelor of Fine Arts in 1972. He then attended the Pennsylvania Academy of the Fine Arts and the University of Pennsylvania, becoming one of the first African Americans to graduate from the University of Pennsylvania's Master of Fine Arts program, in 1977.

== Works ==
Dupree has displayed his works in both group and solo shows, most recently Works From The Stolen Dreams And Forbidden Fruit Series at the Art Sanctuary in Philadelphia (March 2015); and Stolen Dreams in the Promise Zone at Stockton University (July–August 2015). He is known for his exploration of mixed media including glass, wood, and other materials, and his vibrant use of color.

Blurring the boundaries between painting, collage, printmaking and draftsmanship, Dupree delves wholeheartedly into the realm of complete abstraction.

Dupree's works are included in the permanent collections of the Columbus Museum of Art, the Philadelphia Museum of Art; the African American Museum in Philadelphia; the Pennsylvania Academy of Fine Arts; the Institute of Contemporary Art, Philadelphia at the University of Pennsylvania; the Schomburg Center for Research in Black Culture in New York; and the National Museum of Art in Cardiff, Wales, among others. His works are held by private collectors including LeRoi Moore of the Dave Matthews Band and Patti LaBelle.

He has been active in the Philadelphia Mural Arts Program, and was the artist for the mural in honor of poet and teacher Sonia Sanchez near Temple University. His mural "Evolving Elements" was displayed at the Philadelphia International Airport through its Exhibitions program.

He has also created sets for the Shooting Stars, one of Philadelphia's Mummers Fancy Brigades. The Shooting Stars used Dupree's sets when they won first place in 2008, with the theme "India Land of the Tiger", and 2009, with "Mythic Knights, Defenders of the Realm". They gave Dupree the nickname of "King James".

Dupree's work was featured in the 2015 exhibition We Speak: Black Artists in Philadelphia, 1920s-1970s at the Woodmere Art Museum.

== Awards ==
Dupree has received a number of awards and fellowships, and has been an artist-in-residence at the Contemporary Arts Center, North Adams, MA; the African American Museum, Philadelphia, PA; the National Museum of Wales, Cardiff, Wales; the Brandywine Graphics Studio, Philadelphia, PA; and the Studio Museum in Harlem, New York, NY. In 2010, James Dupree received the Living Legend Award of the Black Alumni Society of the University of Pennsylvania.

== Eminent Domain dispute ==
Dupree Studios is located in the Mantua community of West Philadelphia. In 2005, Dupree bought a dilapidated warehouse at 3617–19 Haverford Avenue for $183,000, and spent as much again on renovating, furnishing, and transforming the property. It has since been appraised by Prudential at a value of $2.2 million. The 8,646-square-foot space is used for living, teaching and studio space as well as for storing and displaying artworks. The studio is estimated to house more than 5,000 pieces of Dupree's work.

On December 27, 2012, the Philadelphia Redevelopment Authority (PRA) seized the deed to Dupree's studio under Pennsylvania's soon-to-expire Eminent Domain Code. In their redevelopment plan, the PRA proposed razing the studio and replacing it with a grocery store and parking lot. The city initially offered to pay Dupree the nominal sum of $600,000 for the property. The Philadelphia Court of Common Pleas supported the PRA's attempt to condemn the property on November 13, 2013, and re-affirmed that decision on June 26, 2014. The actions of the PRA were condemned as "unfair", "unjust", and "un-American".

Dupree contested the seizure, with the help of the Institute for Justice. He received vocal support from a variety of arts and rights groups, including the ACLU, Americans for Prosperity, the Commonwealth Foundation for Public Policy Alternatives, and the Philadelphia Mural Arts Program. On December 11, 2014, the Redevelopment Authority announced that it was ending condemnation proceedings, returning Dupree full right to his land and studio. Dupree himself emphasizes the importance of the final decision, not just for himself, but for others: "I didn't just win. We all won. America wins with this."

== Feature Documentary ==
From 2011 to 2014; two American filmmakers, Tyrone Brown and Joe Sapienza II, merged their two documentaries on Dupree titled: Broken Dreams "The Man I Always Wanted to Be", and released the feature film in November 2015 in Philadelphia. The documentary features Dupree's Art series, his music, lifestyle, his fight against Philadelphia with Eminent Domain, and interviews with Mantua residents and their views on the massive takeover of land by Penn & Drexel, the surrounding Universities. Joe Sapienza was filming when James Dupree was battling city hall and filmed the Eminent Domain procedures. He also filmed a one on one interview with Dupree, the "Save Dupree Studios" event in April 2014, the Courthouse Art bid- which was cut from the film for time but can be seen in older DVD versions, the RDA building exchange for Dupree's property, and the final winning deed portion. His original title was "Fighting Iridescence" with focus on the Eminent Domain procedures and approached Tyrone Brown to merge the two stories into one feature after meeting Brown at an event with James. Brown's documentary focused on Dupree's Art and the beginning of the art studio's assessments by the RDA and was titled, "The Man I Always Wanted to Be" which was a direct quote from Dupree to district councilwoman Blackwell. The original ending of the documentary showed a bitter and darker cut of Dupree in the back of his studio among the trash and vacant lots followed by the credits. An alternate ending suggested by Sapienza was shot in the spring of 2015 and re-cut to show Dupree in happier times after he won his deed back from the city, especially after Dupree and his family were not thrilled by the original ending of the film. Tyrone Brown filmed portions of Dupree's documentary first with a one on one interview with Dupree, Dupree's Art series, the Mantua studio, interviews with Dupree's students, the Florida Art Basal event, and the Dupree gallery on 6th & Bainbridge Streets, along with an emotional Dupree at his daughter's wedding, which was cut from the film. Over 18 hours of footage exists between the two filmmakers on Dupree, all cut down to an 80-minute film. The documentary also features bassist and songwriter Jamal Tacuma in the credits which was filmed in Atlantic City for their music video. Drexel University declined Sapienza's request for rights to footage that featured president John Fry talking about the Promised Zone and the future of Mantua, where James Dupree's studio currently resides, and declined two interview requests even though Sapienza is an accredited alumni of Drexel University in the Film & Television program. Jannie Blackwell, district councilwoman for the Mantua section in West Philadelphia declined Sapienza's request for an interview as well. According to the IMDb.com website, many people who worked on the film were credited under alternate names with Sapienza & Brown being the only real names credited.
