= Bois-Franc, Montreal =

Bois-Franc
- Neighbourhood
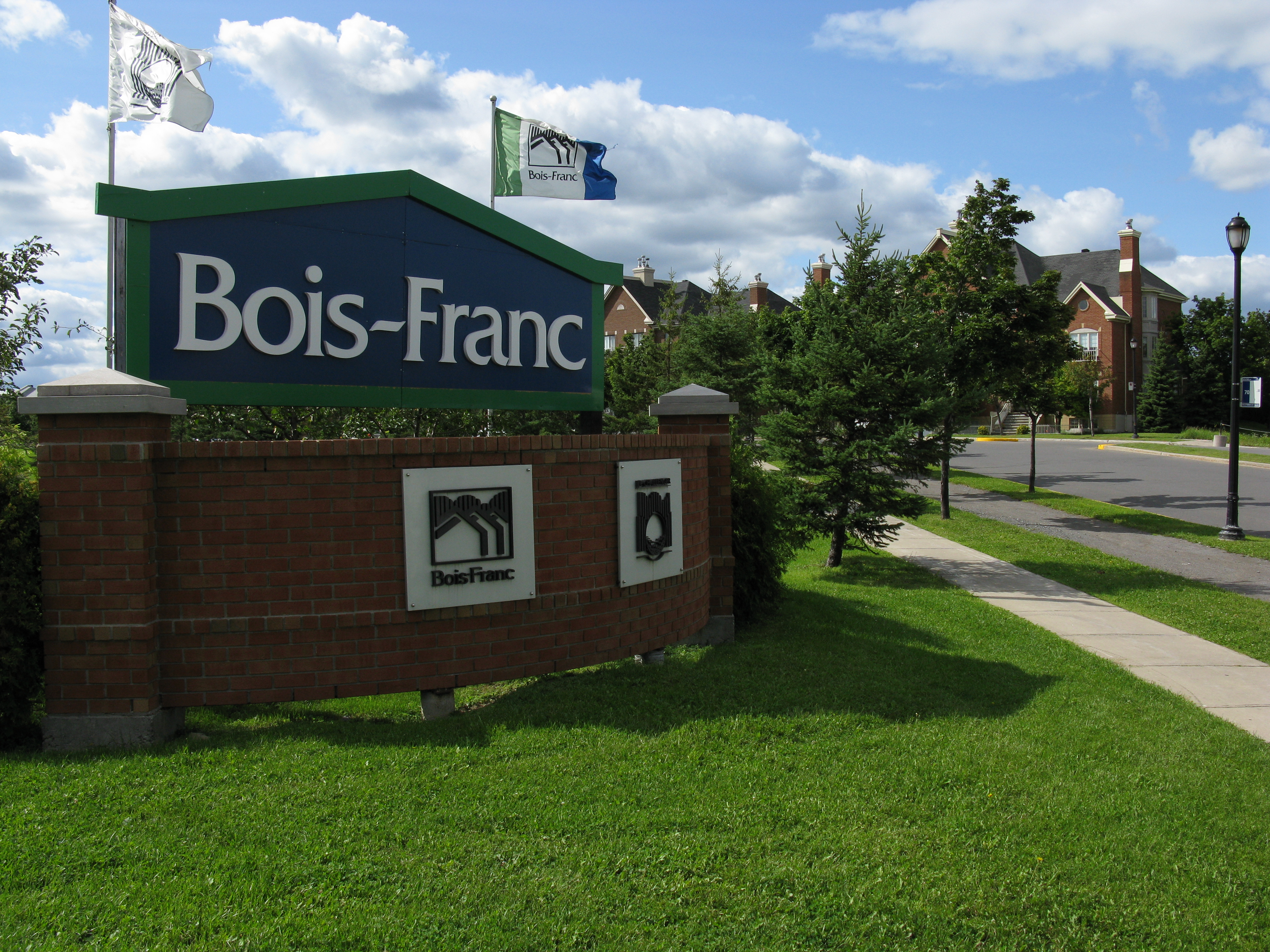
- An entrance of the Bois-Franc neighbourhood on Alexis Nihon Boulevard.

- Location of Bois-Franc in Montreal
- Coordinates: 45.512903°N 73.711569°W
- Country: Canada
- Province: Quebec
- City: Montreal
- Borough: Saint-Laurent
- Postal Code: H4R
- Area codes: 514, 438

Bois-Franc (French pronunciation: [bwafʁɑ̃]) is a residential neighbourhood in the borough of Saint-Laurent in Montreal which was designed by the architect Louis Sauer.

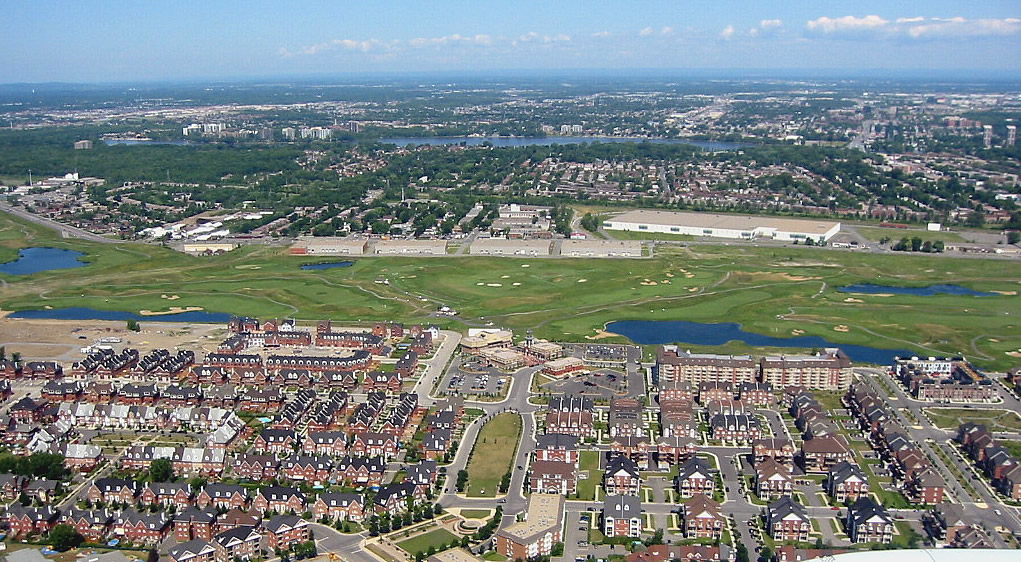
A bird's eye view of Bois-Franc.

== History ==
Bois-Franc is built on land sold by Bombardier Aerospace that used to be Cartierville Airport.

== Transportation ==
Bois-Franc is bordered by four boulevards: Henri Bourassa Boulevard to the north, Marcel Laurin Boulevard to the east, Cavendish Boulevard to the west, and Thimens Boulevard to the southwest.

Bois-Franc REM station is relatively nearby.
