= Philadelphia Redevelopment Authority =

- Philadelphia Redevelopment Authority logo

Agency overview
- Formed: 1945
- Type: Redevelopment authority
- Jurisdiction: City and County of Philadelphia, Pennsylvania
- Headquarters: 1234 Market Street, Philadelphia, PA
- Agency executives: Anne Fadullon, Chair of the Board; Gregory Heller, Executive Director
- Key document: Urban Redevelopment Law of 1945, Commonwealth of Pennsylvania
- Website: https://www.philadelphiaredevelopmentauthority.org/

The Philadelphia Redevelopment Authority (PRA) was created by the Commonwealth of Pennsylvania's Urban Redevelopment Law of 1945. Until the Fall of 2011 it was known as the Redevelopment Authority of the City of Philadelphia (RDA).

== Function ==
The PRA focuses on planning and developing balanced mixed-use communities to create thriving, well-served neighborhoods. As the public government agency charged with the redevelopment of the City of Philadelphia, the Philadelphia Redevelopment Authority provides the foundations that enable private investors to revitalize neighborhoods. The Authority's function is to acquire real estate using the power of eminent domain, plan for redevelopment working with private firms, and financing the redevelopment by issuing municipal bonds of the Authority, with the overall objective of eliminating urban blight in the city of Philadelphia, Pennsylvania.

== Board ==
The Authority is governed by a five-member board, appointed by the mayor of Philadelphia.

== Land disputes ==
The University City Science Center filed a lawsuit to stop the Philadelphia Redevelopment Authority from seizing two parcels of land in the 3800 block of Market Street in West Philadelphia. The lawsuit was filed on May 28, 2010.

On September 28, 2009, the Authority found the Science Center to be in default of an agreement about the two parcels of land, currently used for parking. The Science Center contended in its lawsuit that current economic conditions had delayed redevelopment, saying that the apparent default was caused by an unforeseeable cause, and therefore should not be grounds for taking the land.

From 2012 to 2014, Dupree Studios in the Mantua community of West Philadelphia was the subject of an eminent domain takeover attempt by the Philadelphia Redevelopment Authority, which ended with Dupree keeping his studio.
