= Progressive Architecture Award =

Architecture award

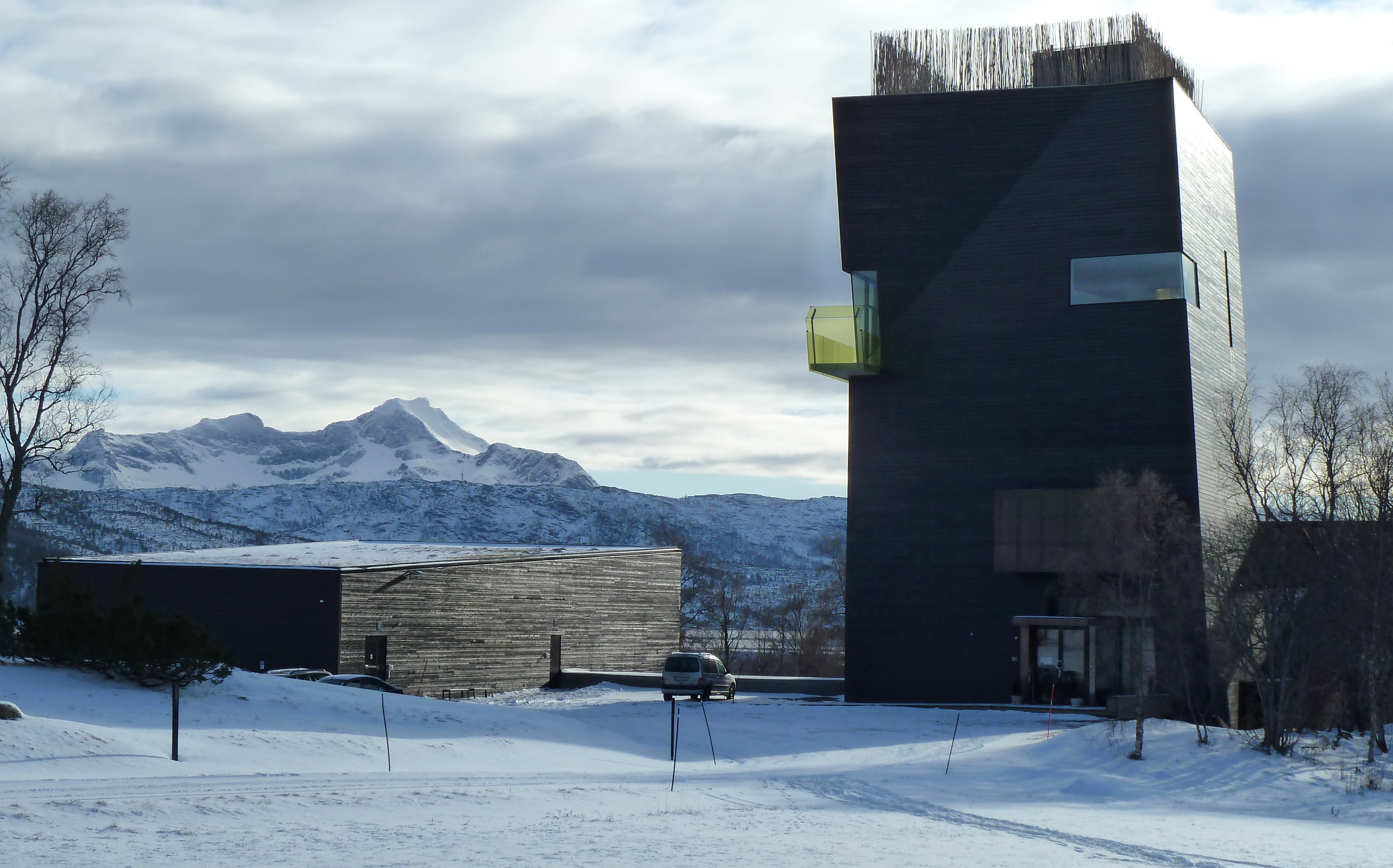
The Hamsunsenteret (Hamsun Center), 1997 P/A Award winner.

The Progressive Architecture Awards (P/A Awards) annually recognize risk-taking practitioners and seek to promote progress in the field of architecture.

== History ==
In June 1920, Pencil Points magazine was founded. At some point it was renamed to New Pencil Points and then in 1945, renamed to Progressive Architecture. In 1996, the Progressive Architecture magazine name and subscriber list was sold to BPI Communications, by Penton Publishing.

The editors of Progressive Architecture magazine hosted the first Progressive Architecture Award jury in 1954, whose members were Victor Gruen, George Howe, Eero Saarinen, and Fred Severud. Progressive Architecture magazine ended the awards in 1987. In 1997, Hanley Wood, owner of Architecture magazine, restarted Progressive Architecture Awards. In 2007, Architecture folded, and the awards were inherited by the new publication Architect Magazine.

== PA Design Awards ==
=== First place ===
- 1985 Wexner Center for the Arts (Columbus, OH) — Peter Eisenman
- 1983 Citation for NSF-funded Research on Lightweight Structures — Zann Gill
- 1980 Citation for Frehley House --George Ranalli
- 1973 Queens Village (Philadelphia) Louis Sauer
- 1969 Head House Square East (Society Hill, Philadelphia) — Louis Sauer
- 1966 Redevelopment of City Center Plan (Oakland, California) — William Liskamm and Rai Okamoto
- 1965 Pastorius Mews (Germantown, Philadelphia) — Louis Sauer
- 1964 James Hamilton House (New Hope, Pennsylvania) — Louis Sauer
- 1964 11th and Waverly Town Houses (Philadelphia) — Louis Sauer
- 1963 Richard Cripps House (Lambertville, New Jersey) — Louis Sauer
- 1954 Back Bay Center Development (Boston, Massachusetts) - Boston Center Architects

=== Second place ===
- 2003 Dalki Theme Park and Shop (Dalki, South Korea) — Slade Architecture
- 1999 Von Erlach Residence (Shelter Island, New York) — Cho Slade Architecture
- 1999 Large piazza located on a landfill in the Adige River in Verona, Italy — Michael Gabellini
- 1991 Vermont & Santa Monica MTA Transit Station (Los Angeles, California) — Mehrdad Yasdani

=== Third place ===
- 2021 Teweles & Brandeis Granary — LA DALLMAN
- 2020 Richard Gilder Center for Science, Education, and Innovation — Studio Gang
- 2019 Ring of Hope — Paul Preissner Architects
- 2013 Arctic Food Network — Lateral Office
- 2013 Beukenhof Crematorium and Auditorium — Asymptote Architecture
- 2013 Floatyard — Perkins+Will
- 2013 Rock Chapel Marine — Landing Studio
- 2013 The Farm: Gaming Strategies for Empowering Marginalized Youth — Steven Mankouche and Matthew Schulte
- 2013 Calexico West Land Port of Entry — Perkins+Will
- 2013 Dortoir Familial — NADAAA
- 2013 Kimball Art Center — BIG
- 2013 Modulo Prep Library — CRO
- 2013 Studio Smart Material House — by Barkow Leibinger
- 2007 Hybrid Urban Sutures — Aziza Chaouni
- 2007 Calgary Centre for Global Community — Marc Boutin Architect
- 2007 Pittman Dowell Residence — Michael Maltzen Architecture
- 2007 Villa Moda, New Kuwait Sports Shooting Club — Office dA
- 2007 Bahá'í Mother Temple for South America — Hariri Pontarini Architects
- 2007 Bab Tebbaneh School for Working Children and for Women — Hashim Sarkis
- 2007 Campus d'Espoir (campus of hope) — Studio Luz Architects
- 2007 Good Shepherd Ecumenical Retirement Community — the University of Arkansas Community Design Center
