= Saint-Laurent, Quebec =

Borough of Montreal in Canada

Saint-Laurent
- Borough of Montreal
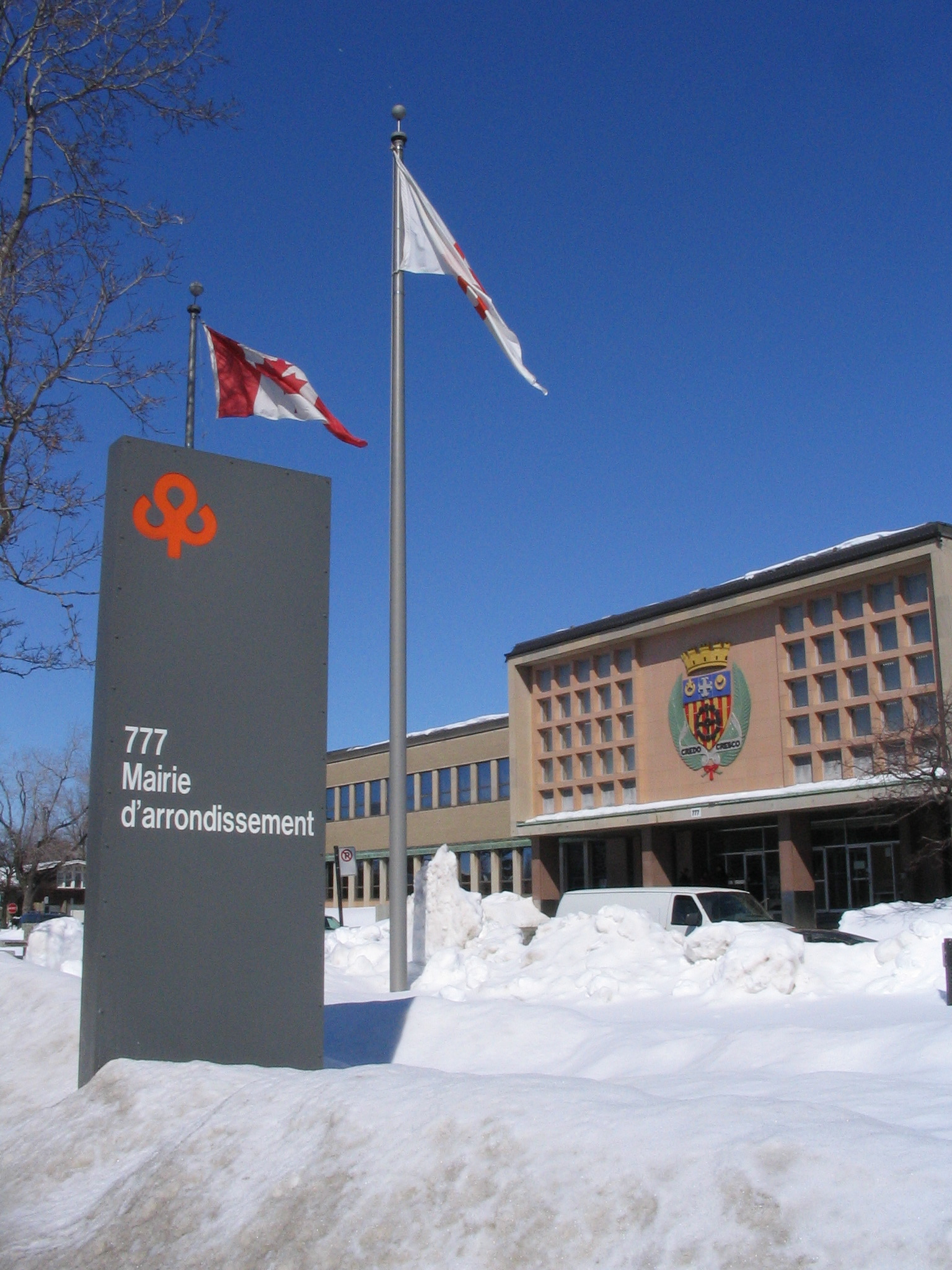
- Saint-Laurent borough hall.

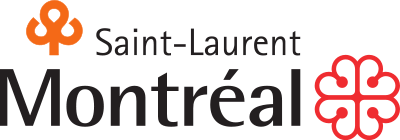

- Location on the Island of Montreal. (Dark grey areas indicate demerged municipalities).
- Coordinates: 45.502°N 73.707°W
- Country: Canada
- Province: Quebec
- Region: Montreal
- Established: January 1, 2002
- Electoral Districts Federal: Saint-Laurent
- Provincial: Saint-Laurent and Acadie

Government
  - Type: Borough
  - Mayor: Alan DeSousa (EM)
  - Federal MP(s): Emmanuella Lambropoulos (LPC)
  - Quebec MNA(s): Marwah Rizqy (PLQ); Christine St-Pierre (PLQ)

Area
  - Land: 42.8 km^{2} (16.5 sq mi)

Population (2016)
  - Total: 98,828
  - Density: 2,310.7/km^{2} (5,985/sq mi)
  - Pop 2011-2016: ▲5.3%
  - Dwellings: 37,370
- Time zone: UTC−5 (EST)
  - Summer (DST): UTC−4 (EDT)
- Postal code(s): H4L, H4M, H4N, H4R, H4S, H4T
- Area codes: (514) and (438)
- Highways A-13 A-15: A-40; A-520
- Website: https://montreal.ca/en/saint-laurent

Saint-Laurent (French: [sɛ̃lɔʁɑ̃]) is a borough of the city of Montreal, Canada, located in the northern part of the island. Although it is no longer an independent city, it is still commonly known as Ville Saint-Laurent (City of Saint-Laurent) or by its initials, VSL.

Saint-Laurent is the largest of Montreal's boroughs by land area. Its population was 98,828 inhabitants in 2016.

== History ==
The history of Saint-Laurent begins in the end of the 17th century with the settling of the lands given by Maisonneuve, first governor of Montreal, then by the Sulpicians, lords of Montreal's island, to Jean Descarie. His three sons were the first to settle on the lands of Cote Saint-Laurent in 1687. After the signing of the Great Peace of Montreal in 1701, 19 other settlers joined them and built a chapel the next year.

=== The Parish of Saint-Laurent ===
On September 20, 1720, Saint-Laurent was founded as the Parish of Saint-Laurent. On March 3, 1722, its territory was defined, it then had 29 scattered dwellings. On August 10, 1735, a new church was erected next to the intersection of Montée Saint-Laurent (future Sainte-Croix boulevard) and Chemin de la Côte-Vertu. Its central location in the parish, halfway between the Côte Saint-Laurent and the Côte Notre-Dame, facilitating access, will become the heart of a village. Indeed, it was along Montée Saint-Laurent, the axis linking Ville-Marie to the North Shore, that the first businesses developed, notably inns and blacksmiths to serve travellers.

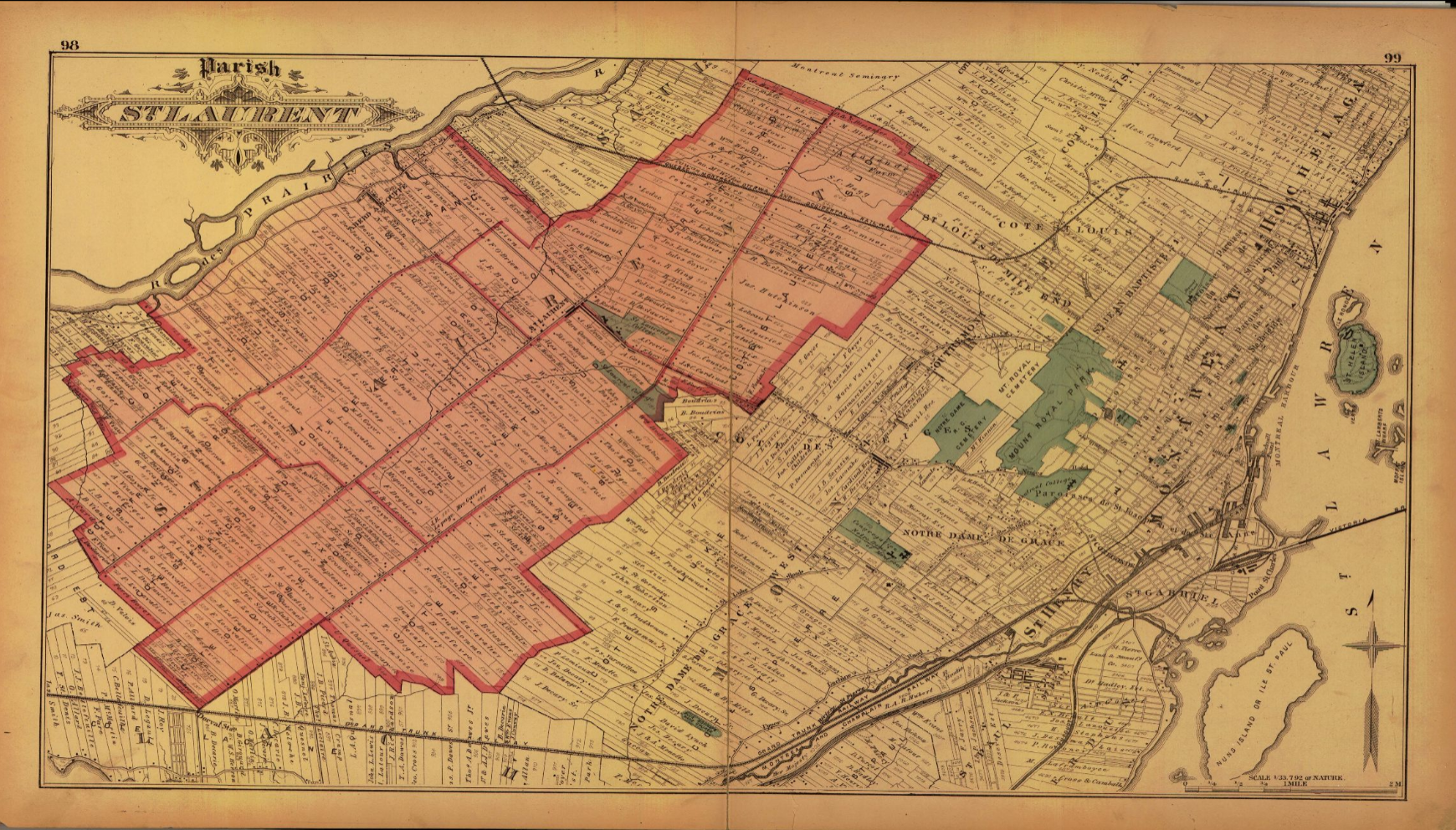
The territory of the Parish of Saint-Laurent (1879).

By 1740, all the lands administered by the Sulpicians were granted to settlers. 162 families lived there in 1765. After the cession of New France to Great Britain, Saint-Laurent experienced no population exodus and Scottish families joined the French Canadians. In 1825, the parish was the most populated on the Island of Montreal outside of those of the city of Montreal. It was then an agricultural village, market gardening being the specialty of the place.

In 1837, the church of Saint-Laurent, damaged by lightning in 1806, was rebuilt. On May 15 of the same year, Louis-Joseph Papineau made one of the most important speeches of his career there in front of his supporters gathered on the square.

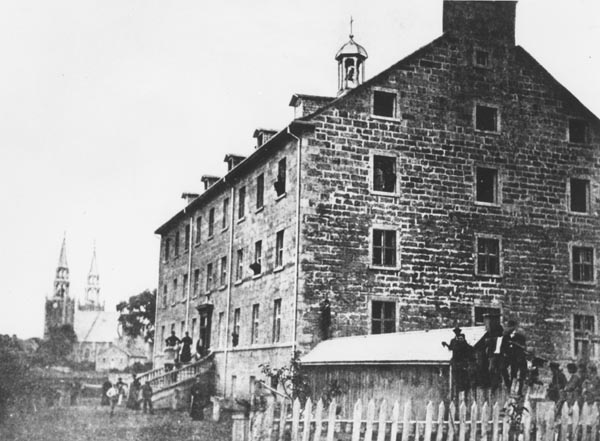
The college of Saint-Laurent and the Church after rebuild behind (1862).

The growth of the village began with the arrival of the Fathers of Sainte-Croix religious congregation in 1847. They built their Canadian headquarters around the church and then, in 1852, an educational establishment: the Industrial Academy. The prestigious reputation of this bilingual school, which took the name of Collège de Saint-Laurent, would make that of the village.

In 1885, the arrival of the Grand Trunk Railway between Saint-Laurent and Montreal attracted new industries complementing the exploitation of quarries which had been the main industry since 1860.

=== The city of Saint-Laurent ===
On February 27, 1893, the urbanized center of the parish obtained the status of city. There were then 225 houses for 1,225 inhabitants. During the 20th century, the parish was successively amputated of several territories, which would become the Town of Mount-Royal, Cartierville, as well as part of Dorval. The city of Saint-Laurent and the parish of Saint-Laurent will coexist until 1954 and the complete annexation of the latter.

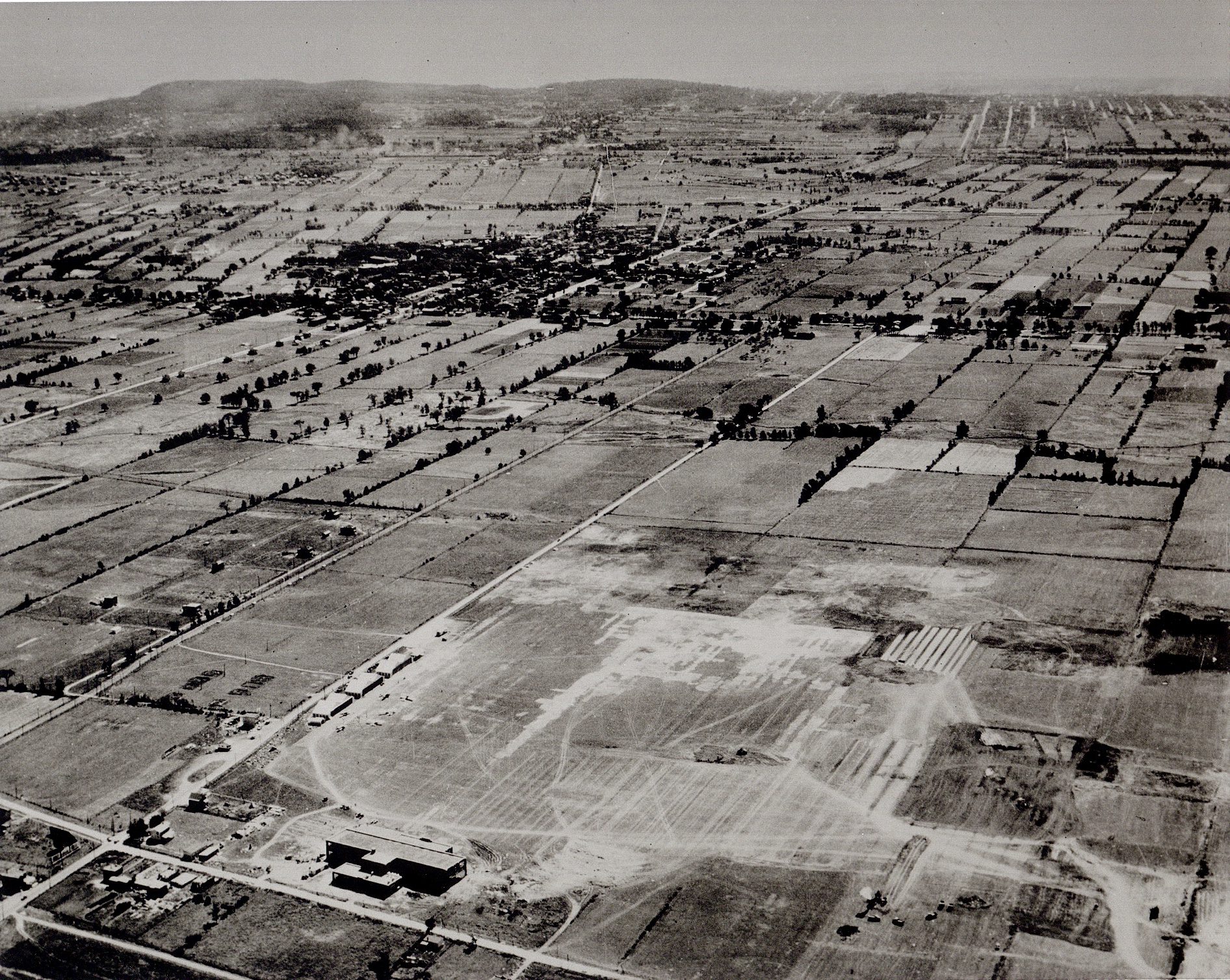
Cartierville airport in Saint-Laurent (1929).

In 1896, the Montreal Park and Island Railway Company tramway reached Saint-Laurent along the Grande-Allée-de-Florence (current Decarie Boulevard). The same year, at the instigation of the mayor and promoter Édouard Gohier, the city adopted an urban plan which grouped together the sectors of activity following the City Beautiful model. To attract Montreal families to the countryside, the establishment of certain polluting industries (slaughterhouses, distilleries, gasworks) was prohibited and the municipal territory was divided into deep plots bordered by wide tree-lined streets.

The city was modernized with the arrival of electric lighting in 1900 and a complete aqueduct system the following year. A town hall, which also served as a fire station, was built in 1912 on the site of the current Vieux-Saint-Laurent library. Ten years later, a hospital opened its doors.

On October 21, 1918, the Deux-Montagnes line of the Canadian Northern Railway, the first electrified railway line in Canada, directly linked Saint-Laurent to downtown Montreal. Three stations were built on the municipal territory: Vertu (renamed Montpellier), Monkland and Lazard (renamed Val-Royal then Bois-Franc), the terminus.

In 1911, an aerodrome, the Bois-Franc Field, was built west of the city. It became Cartierville airport. The aeronautical industry settled there in 1935 with the small factory of Noorduyn Aviation, joined in 1942 by that of Vickers which would become Canadair. It experienced considerable growth during World War II. Tens of thousands of workers took part in the war effort and a first residential suburb, the Norvick district (contraction of Noorduyn-vickers), was built on the model of garden cities to house some of them nearby.

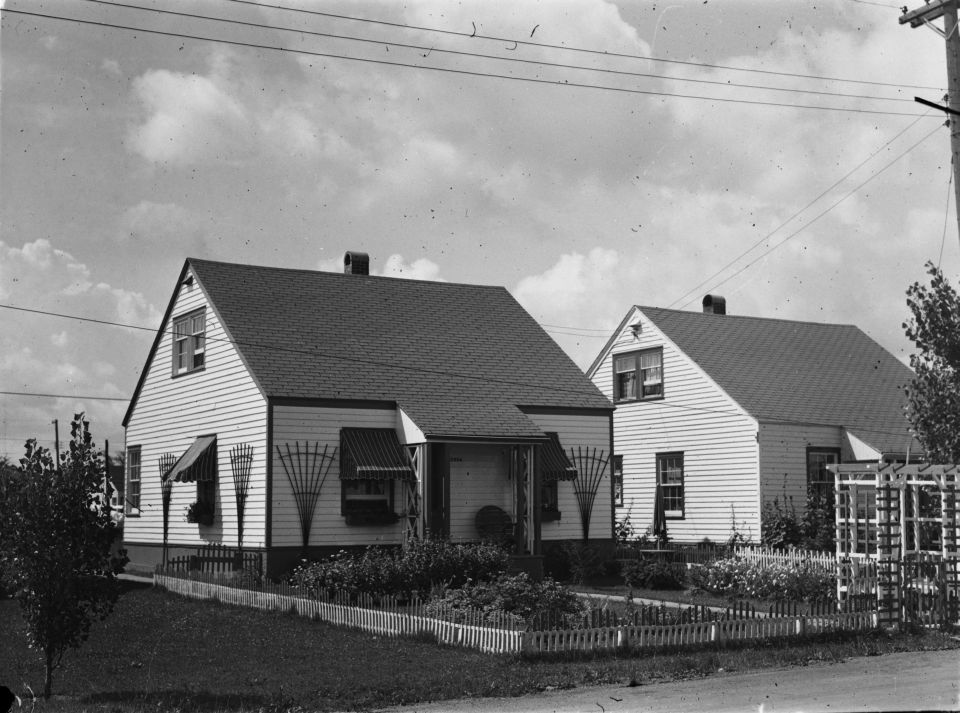
Houses of Norvick district (1947).

After the war, Saint-Laurent experienced an unprecedented economic and demographic boom. While agriculture was gradually disappearing, the expanse of land available in the immediate vicinity of Dorval airport and the metropolitan and Décarie highways favored industrial development to such an extent that Saint-Laurent became the second industrial city in Quebec, behind Montreal. Alongside the factories, new suburbs structured for cars were developing to the north and west of the historic centre. The reconstruction, in 1957, of the Town Hall on new land to the west testifies to the displacement of the center of gravity of the city. In 1968, the college became the Cégep de Saint-Laurent. Two years later, an English-speaking public college opened its doors: Vanier College. In addition to bungalows, the 1960s and 1970s saw the construction of large modernist housing developments on the outskirts of the city.

Streetcars ceased to serve Saint-Laurent at the end of 1959 and were replaced by buses. On January 9, 1984, the metro replaced them with the opening of the Du Collège station. A second station, Côte-Vertu, opened at the end of 1986. Two more were then planned but did not see the light of day following the budgetary restrictions of the 1990s.

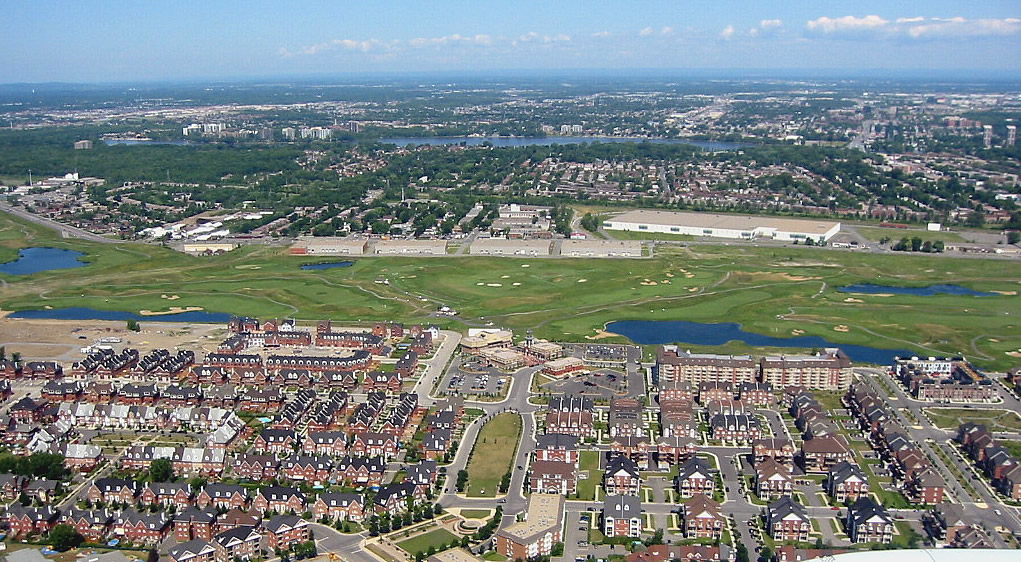
Aerial view of Bois-Franc district and golf (2006).

In the last decade of the 20th century, urban planning continued with projects inspired by new urbanism that gave pride of place to green spaces and bodies of water. An industrial park, Technoparc Montréal, was inaugurated in 1992 with the aim of attracting high-tech companies. Today, the Technoparc is Canada's first science park. It is managed by the City of Montreal and brings together more than a hundred companies in the aeronautics, life sciences, pharmaceuticals and technology sectors.

In March 1988, the town hall launched a vast housing construction project: the New Saint-Laurent. The same year, the Bombardier group took advantage of the closure of Cartierville airport, which it owned, to propose its conversion into a residential area. Construction of the Bois-Franc district officially began on August 6, 1993, but sales being slower than expected, a golf course was built on unsold land in June 2002. The golf closed in November 2011 and construction resumed.

=== The borough of Saint-Laurent ===
The City of Saint-Laurent or Ville Saint-Laurent was merged into the city of Montreal on January 1, 2002, by the Parti Québécois government. On June 20, 2004, the demerger forces lost a referendum on the issue of recreating Saint-Laurent as a city. While 75% of the turnout voted to demerge, this only represented 28.5% of the total eligible voting population, falling short of the requisite 35% as set by the province.

The construction of the Réseau express métropolitain added four light metro stations to the borough in 2025, three of which replaced existing commuter train stations.

== Geography ==
Saint-Laurent is one of Montreal's outer boroughs located in the north central part of the island. It's bordered by Pierrefonds-Roxboro to the west, Ahuntsic-Cartierville to the north and east, and Côte-des-Neiges and the Town of Mount-Royal to the south.

Saint-Laurent is home to many parks including the Bois-de-Liesse Nature Park.

Notable neighbourhoods include Bois-Franc, Vieux Saint-Laurent, Norgate and Saint-Laurent North.

== Demographics ==
Historical populations
Year	Pop.	±%
1966	59,188	—
1971	62,955	+6.4%
1976	64,404	+2.3%
1981	65,900	+2.3%
1986	67,002	+1.7%
1991	72,402	+8.1%
1996	74,240	+2.5%
2001	77,391	+4.2%
2006	84,833	+9.6%
2011	93,842	+10.6%
2016	98,828	+5.3%

Home language (2016)
Language	Population	Percentage (%)
French	31,380	32%
English	21,530	22%
Other languages	32,185	33%
Multiple responses	13.260	13%

Mother tongue (2016)
Language	Population	Percentage (%)
French	26,950	27%
English	13,360	14%
Other languages	51,310	52%
Multiple responses	6,740	7%

Visible Minorities (2016)
Ethnicity	Population	Percentage (%)
Not a visible minority	45,430	46.6%
Visible minorities	51,965	53.4%

In 2016 the immigrant population was 54 percent.

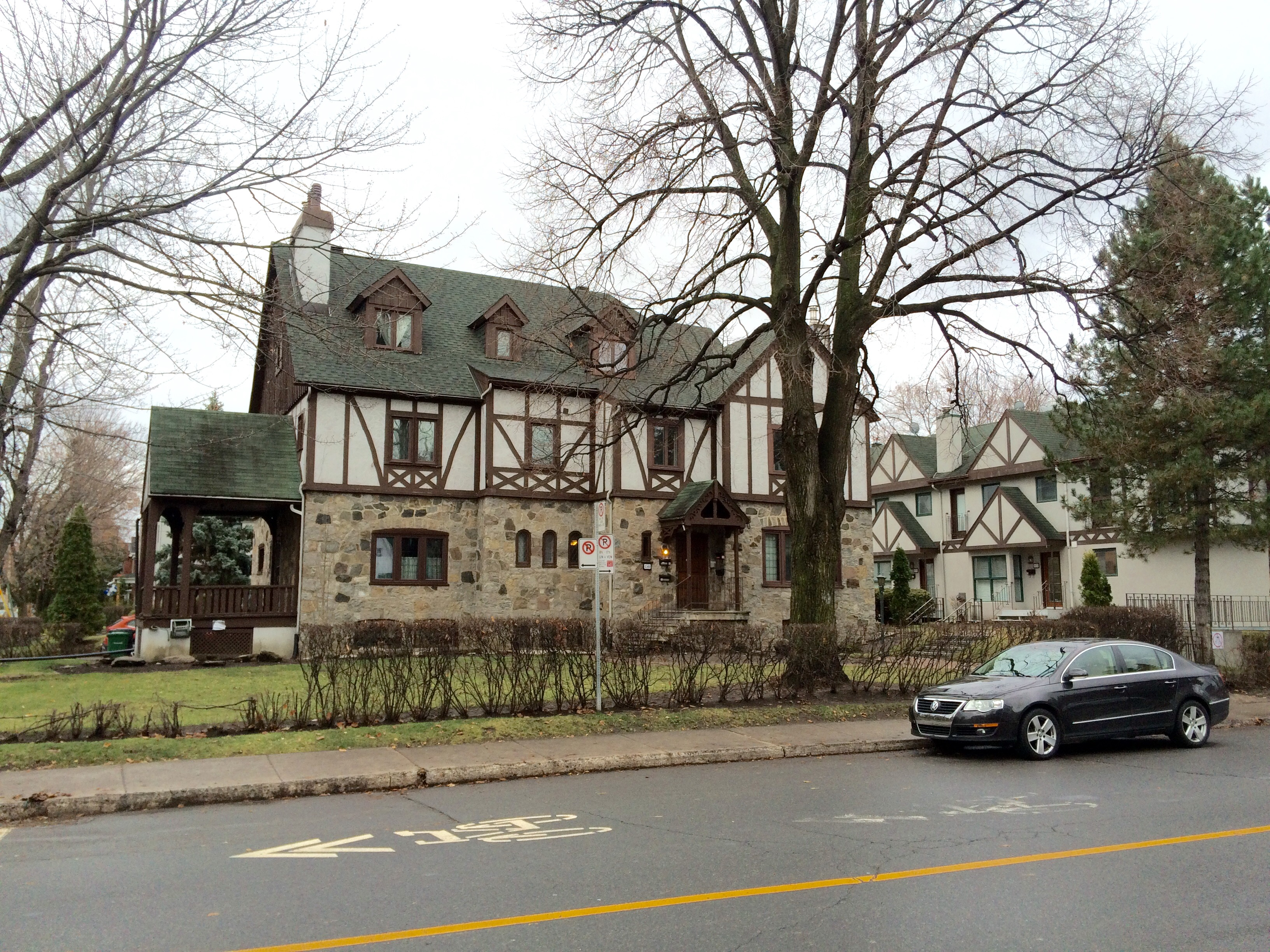
Historic houses in Saint-Laurent.

== Economy ==
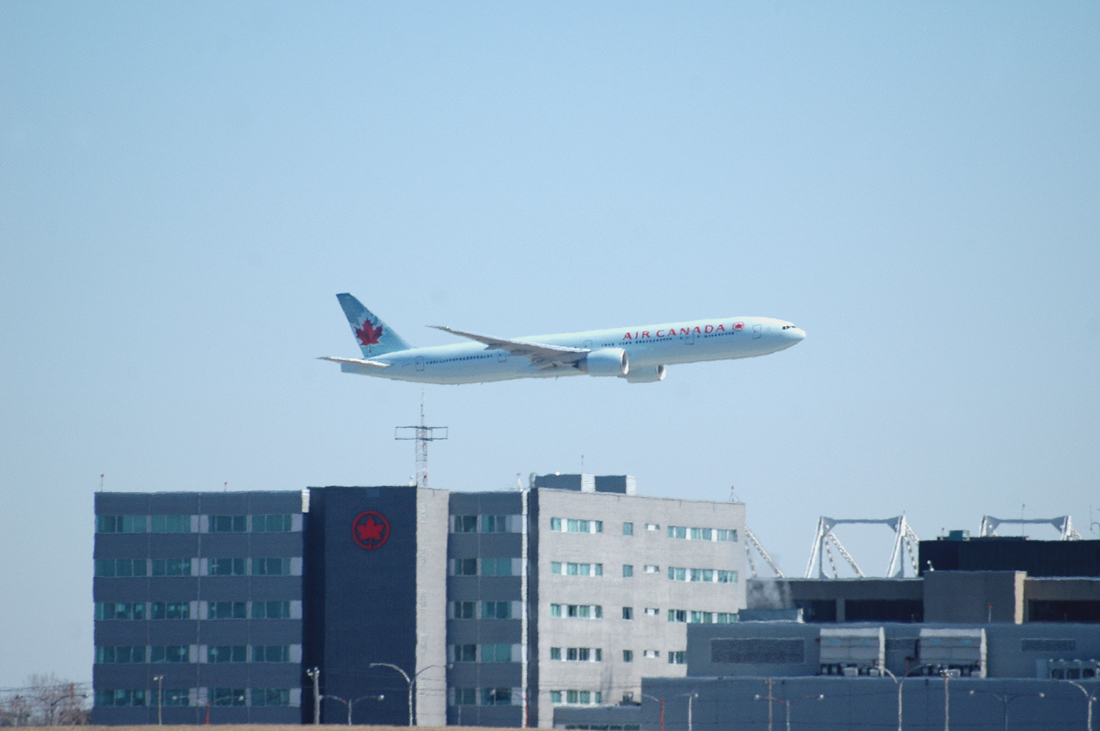
Air Canada Centre, Air Canada headquarters

Saint-Laurent is the second-largest employment hub within the metropolitan region, after downtown Montréal.

Air Canada Centre, also known as La Rondelle ("The Puck" in French), is Air Canada's headquarters, located on the grounds of Montréal–Pierre Elliott Trudeau International Airport and in Saint-Laurent. In 1990 the airline announced that it was moving its headquarters from Downtown Montreal to the airport to cut costs.

In addition Air Transat's headquarters and a regional office of Air Canada Jazz are in Saint-Laurent and on the grounds of Trudeau Airport. Before its dissolution Jetsgo was headquartered in Saint-Laurent.

Bombardier Aerospace has the Amphibious Aircraft Division in Saint-Laurent.

Norgate Shopping Centre (a strip mall) is the oldest shopping centre in Canada. It was built in Saint-Laurent in 1949, is still operational, and was refurbished in the 2010s.

From 1974 to 1979, General Motors Diesel Division buses were built in a plant in Saint-Laurent.

Decarie Hot Dog (French: Décarie Hot Dogs; founded 1969) is a greasy spoon diner counter restaurant and landmark located in Saint-Laurent.

== Government ==
=== Municipal ===
Saint-Laurent is divided into two electoral districts:

- Norman-McLaren (named for Norman McLaren, a cinema pioneer at the National Film Board of Canada, whose headquarters were located in the district from 1956 until 2019);
- Côte-de-Liesse

District	Position	Name	Party
—	Borough mayor City councillor	Alan DeSousa	Ensemble Montréal
Côte-de-Liesse	City councillor	Francesco Miele	Ensemble Montréal
Côte-de-Liesse	Borough councillor	Jacques Cohen	Ensemble Montréal
Norman-McLaren	City councillor	Aref Salem	Ensemble Montréal
Norman-McLaren	Borough councillor	Michèle Biron	Ensemble Montréal

=== Provincial ===
Provincially Saint-Laurent is divided into two ridings:

- Saint-Laurent
- Acadie

=== Federal ===
Federally the entire borough corresponds exactly to the federal riding of Saint-Laurent.

== Infrastructure ==
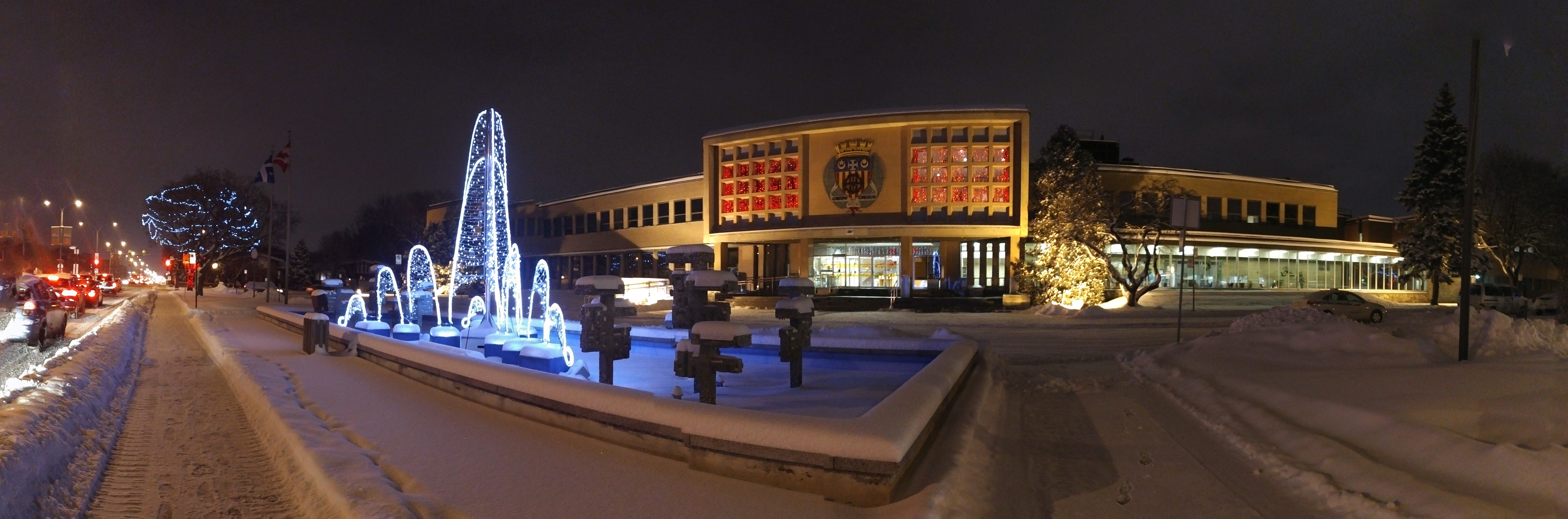
Borough Hall of Saint-Laurent.

Saint-Laurent has three fire stations and two police stations, one municipal court building, two libraries, the former City Hall (now the borough hall). There are two indoor hockey arenas, the municipal Raymond Bourque Arena, named after Raymond Bourque a former NHL player and Hockey Hall of Fame member and a Multipurpose Sports Complex. There is also the commercial Bonaventure's Arena which has rinks available for rent.

=== Transportation ===
Saint-Laurent is served by two metro stations, Du Collège and Côte-Vertu, the latter of which also serves as a major bus terminus. There are plans to extend the Metro's Orange Line to the Bois-Franc REM station with a station at Poirier.

Four light metro stations from the Réseau express métropolitain, Bois-Franc, Du Ruisseau, Montpellier and Côte-de-Liesse, are also located in Saint-Laurent.

Autoroutes include Autoroute 15 (Décarie Expressway), Autoroute 40 (Trans Canada), Autoroute 520, and Autoroute 13, and a secondary highway (Route 117).

in addition to major urban boulevards (Marcel-Laurin Boulevard, Henri Bourassa Boulevard, Cavendish Boulevard, Côte-Vertu Boulevard, Decarie Boulevard, Thimens Boulevard).

The former Cartierville Airport is no more, having been turned into a residential subdivision called Bois-Franc.

Part of Trudeau International Airport also lies within the territory of Saint-Laurent.

== Education ==
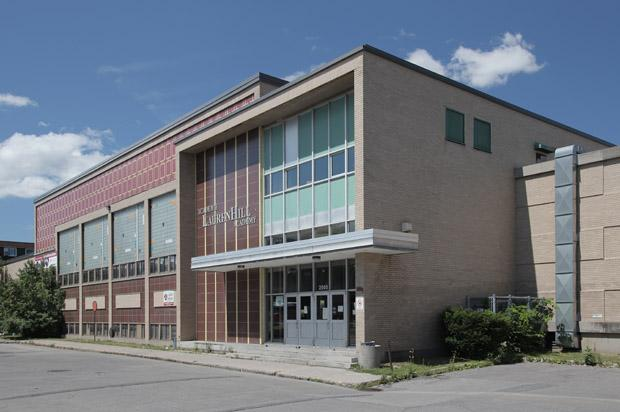
LaurenHill Academy

Saint-Laurent contains two CÉGEPs within its limits, one English (Vanier College) and one French (Cégep de Saint-Laurent). An art museum, the Saint-Laurent Museum of Art, is located on the campus of Cégep de Saint-Laurent, along with an indoor college hockey rink. Formerly, there was also a bowling alley on the campus.

The Centre de services scolaire Marguerite-Bourgeoys (CSSMB) operates Francophone public schools. Formerly this was done by the Commission scolaire Marguerite-Bourgeoys (CSMB).

=== Elementary ===
Francophone

- École Beau-Séjour
- École des Grand Etres
- École Enfant-Soleil
- École Jean-Grou
- École Laurentide
- École Bois-Franc-Aquarelle
- École Édouard-Laurin
- École Jonathan
- École Hébert
- École au Trésor-du-Boisé
- École Cardinal-Léger
- École Enfants-du-Monde
- École Henri-Beaulieu
- École Katimavik

=== High school ===
- École Secondaire Saint-Laurent (Édifice Émile-Legault and Édifice Saint-Germain)

=== Specialized ===
- Centre de formation professionnelle Léonard-De Vinci (Édifice Côte-Vertu and Édifice Thimens)

The English Montreal School Board (EMSB) operates the following Anglophone public schools

=== Elementary ===
- Parkdale Elementary School
- Cedarcrest Elementary School
- Gardenview Elementary School

=== High school ===
- LaurenHill Academy

=== Specialized ===
- St. Laurent Adult Education Centre
- Trans-Canada Driving School Saint-Laurent Courses Class 1, 2, 3, 5. For Auto, Bus and Heavy Trucks for over 25 years on Decarie Boulevard.

=== Private schools ===
- École Alex Manoogian de l'U.G.A.B (Armenian)
- École Maïmonide, Campus Jacob Safra
- École Montessori Ville-Marie, Campus Saint-Laurent
- École bilingue Notre-Dame de Sion
- École Education Plus

Previously Saint-Laurent housed a campus of the United Talmud Torahs of Montreal Jewish school.

Kativik Ilisarniliriniq (formerly Kativik School Board), which operates schools in Nunavik, has its main office in Saint-Laurent.

=== Public libraries ===
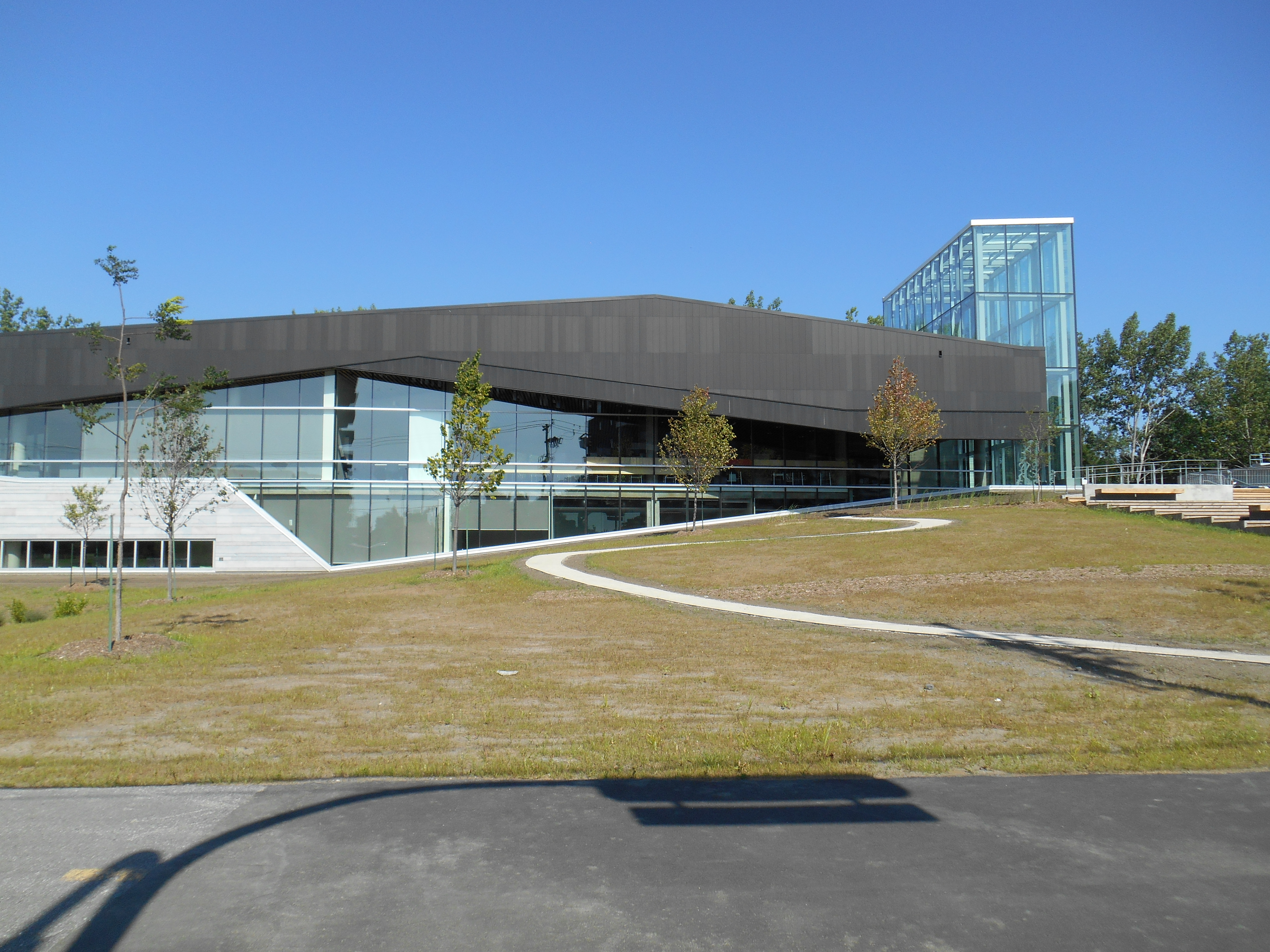
Du Boisé Branch

The Montreal Public Libraries Network operates the Vieux-Saint-Laurent Branch and the Du Boisé Branch in Saint-Laurent.

== International relations ==
=== Twin towns — Sister cities ===
Saint-Laurent is twinned with:

- Mérignac, Gironde, Nouvelle-Aquitaine, France
- Lethbridge, Alberta, Canada

== Notable people ==
- Ray Bourque, former NHL player. A member of the Hockey Hall of Fame.
- Anthony Lukca, professional Canadian football player
- Pierre Houde, a play-by-play sports announcer for RDS.
- Raoul Jarry, Montreal city councillor

== See also ==
- History of Montreal
- Boroughs of Montreal
- Districts of Montreal
- List of former cities in Quebec
- Municipal reorganization in Quebec
