= Terminus Longueuil =

Bus station in Longueuil, Quebec, Canada

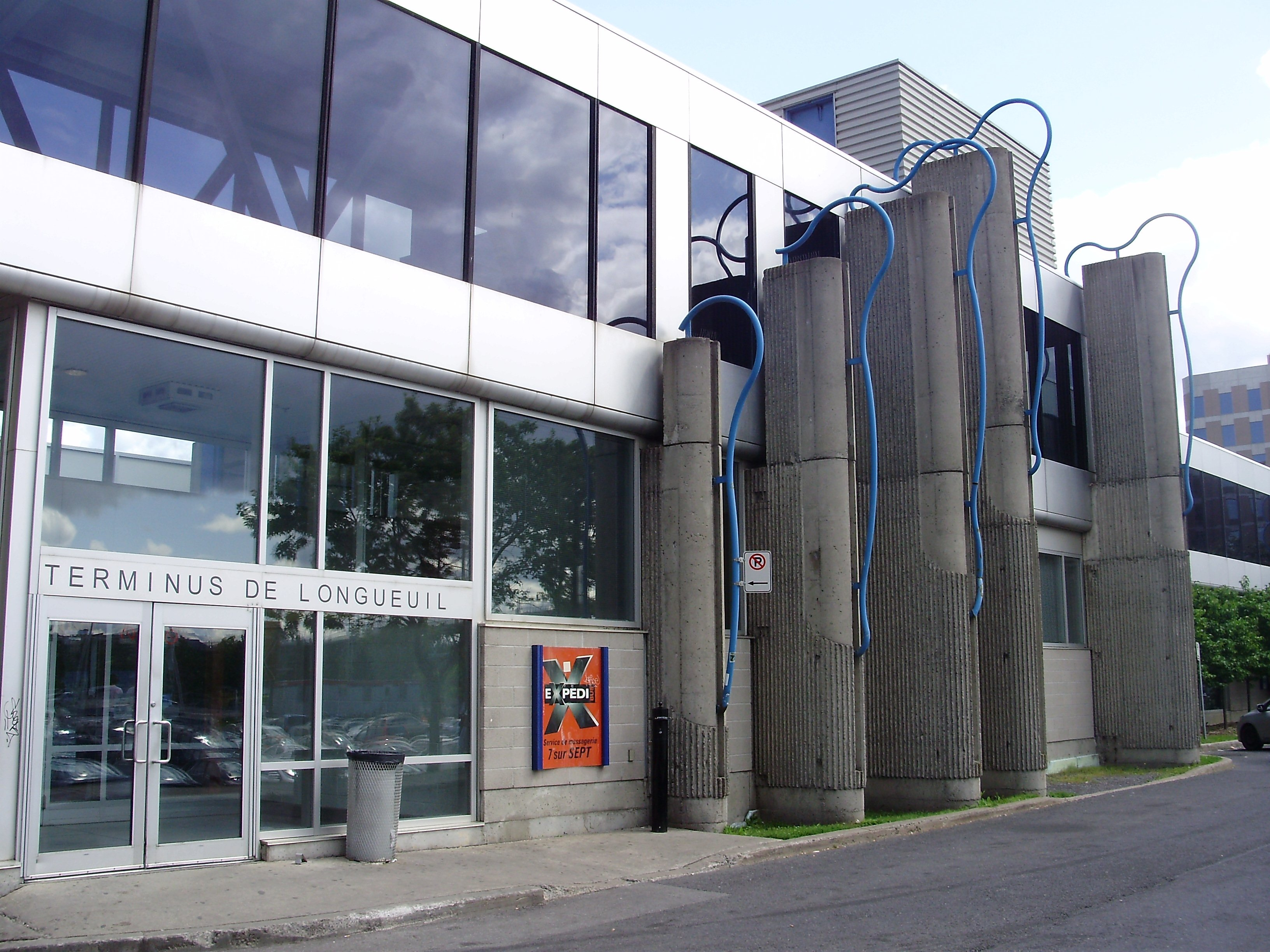

General information
- Location: 120, place Charles-LeMoyne, Longueuil, QC
- Coordinates: 45°31′27″N 73°31′16″W
- Owner: ARTM
- Operator: Réseau de transport de Longueuil
- Bus stands: 41
- Bus operators: Réseau de transport de Longueuil; Exo bus services; STC Pierre-de-Saurel; Intercity buses
- Connections: Longueuil–Université-de-Sherbrooke

Construction
- Parking: 2370 spaces Not gratis
- Cycle facilities: 622 place racks

Other information
- Fare zone: ARTM: B
- Website: Terminus Longueuil

Passengers
- 2016: 12,935,600 (Exo)
Location

Terminus Longueuil is an ARTM bus terminus, part of the Longueuil–Université-de-Sherbrooke Metro complex, in Longueuil, Quebec, Canada, on the south shore of the Saint Lawrence River across from Montreal.

The bus terminus has 41 numbered platforms in 7 lettered sections, mostly used by Greater Montreal transit agencies with some intercity coach services.

== Connecting bus routes ==
Réseau de transport de Longueuil
No.	Route	Connects to	Service times / notes	Terminus wing and gate
1 ♿︎	Desaulniers / Victoria / Windsor	Saint-Lambert	Daily	E-33
3 ♿︎	Secteur Laflèche		Daily	B-12
4 ♿︎	Taschereau / Payer / DIX30	Du Quartier; Brossard	Daily	B-14
6 ♿︎	Victoria	Panama; Saint-Lambert	Daily	C-18
8 ♿︎	ch. Chambly / Cousineau / Promenades St-Bruno	Longueuil–Saint-Hubert	Daily	F-39
9	Secteurs L-M St-Hubert		Weekdays, peak only	B-12
10 ♿︎	Roland-Therrien / Belcourt		Weekends only	E-36
13 ♿︎	Riverside / Secteurs P-V Brossard	Panama	Daily	C-19
14 ♿︎	Rome / DIX30	Brossard	Weekdays only	D-29
15 ♿︎	Riverside / Alexandra / Churchill	Panama	Daily	D-30
16	Nobert / Antoinette-Robidoux / Adoncour		Daily	A-8
17 ♿︎	Roland-Therrien / Roberval		Weekends only	E-35
19	Davis		Daily	B-11
20	Jean-Paul-Vincent / Beauharnois		Daily	B-10
21 ♿︎	Grande-Allée / du Quartier	Du Quartier	Daily	B-15
23	Ste-Hélène / Jacques-Cartier		Weekdays and Saturday only	D-26
25	Parcs industriels Vieux-Longueuil / Boucherville		Daily	G-3
28 ♿︎	ch. Chambly / Savane / ENA		Daily	F-39
29 ♿︎	Collectivité Nouvelle		Daily	D-27
54	Tiffin / St-Georges / Taschereau	Panama	Daily	B-13
71	Curé-Poirier		Daily	B-16
73	Joliette / de Lyon		Daily	E-37
74 ♿︎	St-Laurent / Secteur Bellerive		Daily	C-25
75	Quinn / Brébeuf		Daily	E-34
76 ♿︎	Roland-Therrien / Roberval		Weekdays only	E-36
78	Adoncour / du Colisée		Weekdays, peak only	D-29
80 ♿︎	De Montarville / Carrefour de la Rive-Sud	Terminus De Montarville	Daily	G-1
81	du Fort-St-Louis / Marie-Victorin		Daily	G-3
82	Marie-Victorin / du Fort-St-Louis	Terminus De Montarville	Weekdays, peak only	G-1
83	De Montarville / Samuel-De Champlain		Daily	G-2
84	Samuel-De Champlain / De Montarville		Weekdays only	G-2
85	Îles-Percées / de Mortagne / de Gascogne	Terminus De Montarville	Weekdays, peak only	G-1
88 ♿︎	ch. Chambly / Mountainview	Longueuil–Saint-Hubert	Daily	F-40
98	Parc industriel St-Bruno / Parent		Weekdays, peak only	C-24
99	Promenades St-Bruno / Saint-Bruno-de-Montarville	Seigneurial park and ride	Daily	C-24
120	Fernand-Lafontaine / Stationnement de Mortagne	De Mortagne park and ride	Weekdays, peak only	B-10
123	Jacques-Cartier / Parcs industriels		Daily	D-26
125	Pratt & Whitney / Lumenpulse		Weekdays, peak only	B-10
128	Zone aéroportuaire / Parc industriel St-Bruno	Longueuil–Saint-Hubert	Weekdays, peak only	F-41
161	R.-Therrien / J.-Cartier / De Montarville	Terminus De Montarville; De Mortagne park and ride	Daily	E-36
180	De Montarville / des Sureaux	Terminus De Montarville	Weekdays only	G-1
185	Ampère / Gay-Lussac	De Mortagne park and ride	Weekdays, peak only	G-3
199	Seigneurial / Grand Boulevard	Seigneurial park and ride	Weekdays, peak only	C-24
410	Express Roland-Therrien / Belcourt		Weekdays only	E-35
417	Express Roland-Therrien / Roberval		Weekdays only	E-35
421 ♿︎	Grande-Allée / A.-Frappier		Weekdays only	B-15
428	Zone aéroportuaire / Aéroport MET	Longueuil–Saint-Hubert	Daily Connects to Montreal Metropolitan Airport	F-41
442	Cousineau / Pacific	Longueuil–Saint-Hubert	Weekdays, peak only	F-39
724	Panama – Terminus Longueuil / Métro Longueuil-Université-de-Sherbrooke	Panama	Used in case of a service disruption on the REM	
725	Brossard – Du Quartier – Terminus Longueuil / Métro Longueuil-Université-de-Sherbrooke	Du Quartier; Brossard	Used in case of a service disruption on the REM	
901	Ligne métropolitaine Taschereau	Panama; Terminus La Prairie; Terminus Montcalm-Candiac; Terminus Georges-Gagné	ARTM bus line operated by the RTL Daily	
TA ♿︎	RTL Transport adapté			F-42
Exo Sorel-Varennes sector
No.	Route	Connects to	Service times / notes	Terminus wing and gate
700	Sorel-Tracy - Longueuil	Terminus De Montarville	Daily	G-5
701	Contrecoeur - Longueuil	Terminus Contrecoeur	Daily	G-5
707	Contrecoeur - Varennes (Jean-Coutu) - Longueuil	Terminus Contrecoeur	Weekdays, peak only	G-5
709	Contrecoeur - Longueuil	Terminus Contrecoeur	Daily	G-5
720	Varennes - Longueuil	Terminus De Montarville	Daily	G-4
721	Varennes - Longueuil	Terminus De Montarville	Weekdays, peak only	G-4
722	Varennes - Longueuil	Terminus De Montarville	Weekdays, peak only	G-4
723	Varennes (IREQ) - Longueuil		Weekdays only	G-4
731	Saint-Amable - Longueuil		Weekdays, peak only	G-4
732	Saint-Amable - Longueuil		Weekdays, peak only	G-4
Exo Richelain / Roussillon sector
No.	Route	Connects to	Services times / notes	Terminus wing and gate
550	La Prairie - Longueuil (Cégep É.-Montpetit)	Terminus La Prairie	Weekdays only	C-23
551	Candiac - Longueuil (Cégep É.-Montpetit)	Terminus Montcalm-Candiac	Weekdays only	C-23
555	Delson - Longueuil (Cégep É.-Montpetit)	Terminus Georges-Gagné	Weekdays only	C-23
Exo Chambly-Richelieu-Carignan sector
No.	Route	Connects to	Services times / notes	Terminus wing and gate
680	Chambly - Terminus Longueuil	Terminus Chambly	Weekends only	C-20
681	Chambly - Terminus Longueuil - Cégep É.-Montpetit	Terminus Chambly	Weekdays only	C-20
Exo de la Vallée du Richelieu sector
No.	Route	Connects to	Service times / notes	Terminus wing and gate
200	Saint-Hyacinthe - Longueuil	Saint-Basile-le-Grand; McMasterville	Daily	D-31
201	ExpressO Mont-Saint-Hilaire - Longueuil	Saint-Basile-le-Grand; McMasterville	Weekdays, peak only	D-31
Exo Sainte-Julie sector
No.	Route	Connects to	Services times / notes	Terminus wing and gate
325	Express Longueuil - Cégep	Terminus Sainte-Julie	Weekdays only	C-20
330	Express Longueuil - CFP - Cégep	Terminus Sainte-Julie	Only two departures per direction, weekdays peak only	C-20
340	Express Longueuil - Promenades Saint-Bruno	Terminus Sainte-Julie	Weekends only	C-20
350	Express Longueuil	Terminus Sainte-Julie	Daily	C-20
Exo Transport adapté
No.	Route	Connects to	Service times / notes	Terminus wing and gate
TA ♿︎	Exo Transport adapté			F-42
STC Pierre-de-Saurel
No.	Route	Connects to	Service times / notes	Terminus wing and gate
750	Express Sorel-Tracy - Longueuil		Daily	A-7
751	Express Sorel-Tracy - Longueuil via Saint-Roch-de-Richelieu		Only one trip per direction, weekdays only	A-7
752	Express Sorel-Tracy - Longueuil via Varennes		Only two trips per direction, weekdays only	A-7
753	Express Sorel-Tracy - Longueuil via Sainte-Julie	Terminus Sainte-Julie	Only two trips towards Sorel, weekdays only	A-7
TA ♿︎	STC Transport adapté			F-42

=== Intercity buses ===
Intercity buses
Company	Main Destinations
Adirondack Trailways	Albany, New York City
Limocar	Sherbrooke, Magog
Orléans Express	Quebec City, Rivière-du-Loup

== See also ==
- List of park and rides in Greater Montreal
- Longueuil–Université-de-Sherbrooke station
