= Yellow Line (Montreal Metro) =

Metro line in Montreal, Quebec, Canada

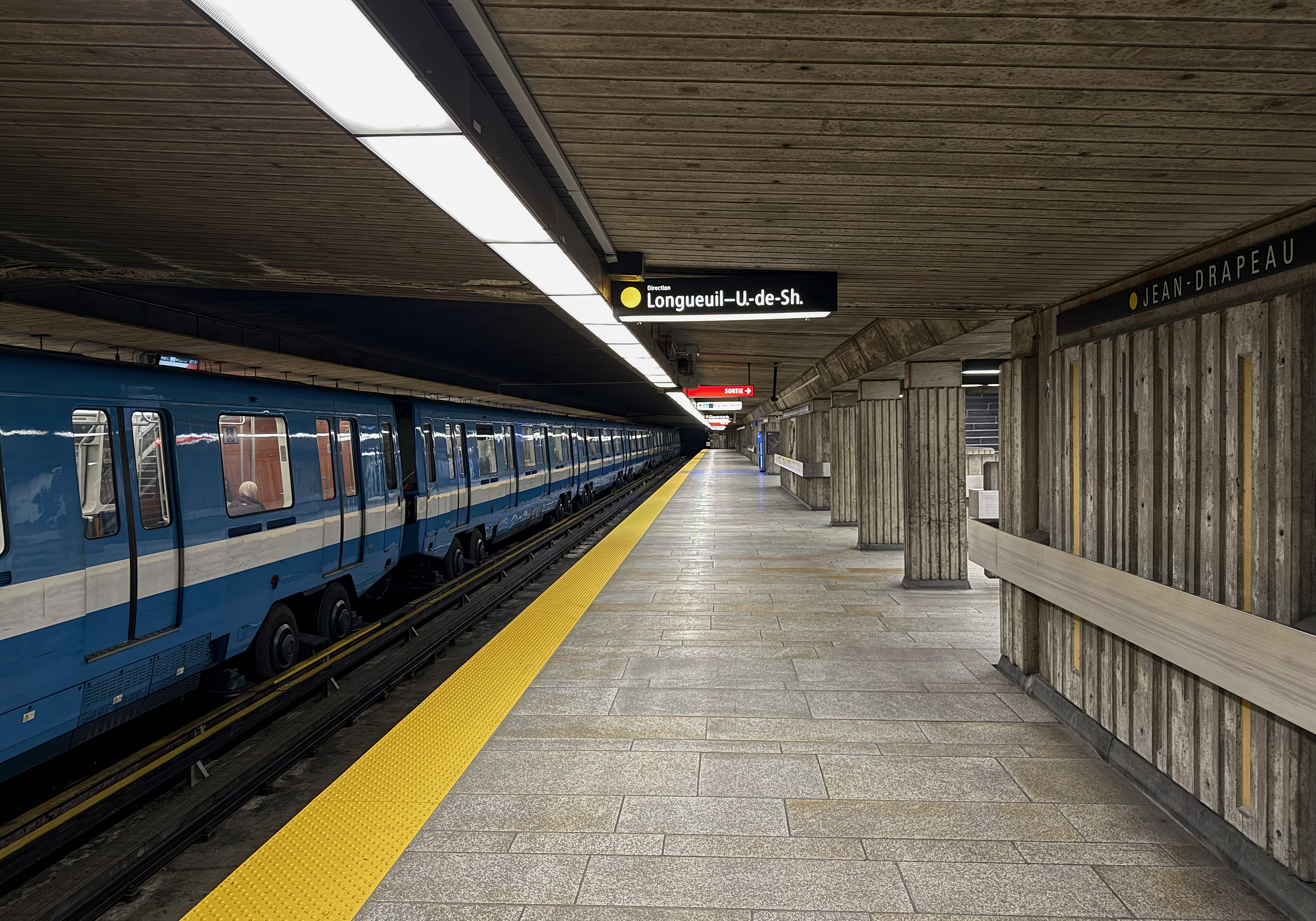
- Jean-Drapeau station

Overview
- Native name: Ligne jaune (French)
- Line number: 4
- Locale: Montreal, Quebec, Canada
- Termini: Berri–UQAM (north); Longueuil–Université-de-Sherbrooke (south)
- Stations: 3

Service
- Type: Rapid transit
- System: Montreal Metro
- Operator: Société de transport de Montréal (STM)
- Depot(s): None (Berri-UQAM connecting track links line 4 with lines 1 and 2 so that trains can access Angrignon, Beaugrand and Plateau d'Youville garages)
- Rolling stock: Bombardier Transportation MR-73 cars

History
- Opened: April 1, 1967; 59 years ago (restricted access); April 28, 1967; 59 years ago (public opening)
- 1988: Berri-de-Montigny renamed Berri–UQAM
- 2001: Île Sainte-Hélène renamed Jean-Drapeau
- 2003: Longueuil renamed Longueuil–Université-de-Sherbrooke

Technical
- Line length: 4.25 km (2.64 mi)
- Track gauge: 1,435 mm (4 ft 8 1/2 in) standard gauge
- Electrification: Guide bar, 750 V DC
- Operating speed: 40–65 km/h (25–40 mph)
- Maximum incline: 6.3%
Route map
Yellow Line highlighted in yellow

The Yellow Line (French: Ligne jaune, pronounced [liɲ ʒon]), also known as Line 4 (French: Ligne 4), is one of the Montreal Metro's four routes operating in Montreal, Quebec, Canada.

Built to serve the crowds of the Expo 67 exhibition, the line now forms a key link between Downtown Montreal, the South Shore and the city of Longueuil. The line is the shortest on the Metro at 4.25 kilometres (2.64 mi) long, having not been extended since its opening in 1967. All three stations on the line have been renamed since their opening.

== Route ==
The Yellow Line is a 4.25 kilometres (2.64 mi) east–west line connecting the Island of Montreal with the South Shore and the city of Longueuil, serving three stations. As with other Montreal Metro lines, the entirety of the line is in tunnel. The line does not have a depot, however a connecting track at Berri–UQAM allows access to both the Green and Orange lines.

At the western end of the line, Berri–UQAM station is located 28 metres (92 ft) below rue Saint-Denis, below the level of the Green and Orange lines. Departing Berri–UQAM, the line heads southeast, with downward gradients of 6% taking the line south under Old Montreal and the Old Port of Montreal. The deepest point of the Metro network is located 54 metres (177 ft) below rue Notre-Dame in the Old Town. The line then heads northeast, gradually ascending as it passes under St. Lawrence River, to the cut and cover Jean-Drapeau station on Île Sainte-Hélène. The distance between Berri–UQAM and Jean-Drapeau is 2.36 kilometres (1.47 mi), the longest distance between two stations on the Metro. Departing Jean-Drapeau, the line descends to pass underneath Le Moyne Channel, Île Notre-Dame and the St. Lawrence Seaway, before ascending at gradients of 6.3% to the terminus at Longueuil–Université-de-Sherbrooke in Longueuil.

== History ==
=== Planning and construction ===
In November 1961, Montreal City Council decided to build a Metro network, however the Yellow Line was not part of the original plans. A year later, however, Montreal's bid to host the 1967 World's Fair (Expo 67) was accepted.

In early 1963, Executive Chairman of Montreal City Council Lucien Saulnier asked engineers overnight to come up with a proposal to link the city to a potential location for the exposition in the St. Lawrence River. On March 29, 1963, the location for the World's Fair was officially announced, with the under construction Metro to be extended to serve the site. On August 6, 1963, the decision to build the line was approved by Montreal City Council in a special meeting, at an estimated cost of $17 million. In May 1964, tenders were sought to build the line. The previously proposed station on Île Notre-Dame was omitted from the design, with the Expo Express to be built instead. The suburb of Longueuil to the east of Montreal contributed $3.3 million towards the construction of the line.

Construction of the Red Line (line 3) was subsequently cancelled; with the Yellow Line built to connect the artificial islands hosting the expo in the St. Lawrence River with downtown Montreal and the rapidly-growing suburb of Longueuil. The tunnels below the St. Lawrence River were dug in bedrock, with open cut construction methods used for the tunnels across the new artificial islands. The artificial islands used spoil from Metro tunnelling to assist in constructing them.

=== Opening for Expo 67 ===
The official opening of the line took place on April 1, 1967. In the first four weeks, the station on Île Sainte-Hélène served only the construction workers of the Expo site. The line finally opened to the public on April 28, 1967, the day after the official opening of Expo 67. During the Expo, Île Sainte-Hélène station handled over 60,000 passengers an hour.

Following the closure of Expo 67, the line serves the La Ronde amusement park, events at Parc Jean-Drapeau (such as the Canadian Grand Prix) as well as allowing connections to Longueuil and the South Shore. In 1991, the Université de Sherbrooke opened its campus in Longueuil, adjacent to the Metro station.

The line is now a key link between the South Shore and Montreal, with 40% of public transit users from the South Shore using the line in the morning peak. Longueuil–Université-de-Sherbrooke is one of the busiest stations on the Metro network.

All three stations on the line have been renamed – with Berri-de Montigny renamed to Berri–UQAM in 1988, Île Sainte-Hélène renamed to Jean-Drapeau in 2001, and Longueuil renamed to Longueuil–Université-de-Sherbrooke in 2003.

=== Accessibility ===
In 2019, Jean-Drapeau became the first station on the line to be made accessible. As of 2023, construction work is underway to make the Yellow Line platforms at Berri–UQAM accessible, despite the technical challenge of excavating and building new elevators 28 metres (92 ft) below street level.

== Proposed extensions ==
=== South Shore extension ===
In 2009, Premier of Quebec Jean Charest announced $12 million to undertake Metro extension feasibility work. This would include an eastern extension of the Yellow Line, to serve Pierre-Boucher Hospital and CÉGEP Édouard-Montpetit.

In December 2011, STM announced their long term extension plans, which included an extension of the line further into Longueuil. The former Agence métropolitaine de transport (now ARTM) published a study, Vision 2020 in December 2011. The study had plans for the Yellow Line to be extended further into the city of Longueuil along Roland-Therrien Boulevard. The six new stations would connect residential areas, shopping centers, and several schools.

During the 2010s, Longueuil politicians continued to push for an extension of the Metro further south, while the provincial government and the City of Montreal focused on a proposed extension of the Blue Line to Anjou instead.

In 2020, CDPQ Infra (developers of the Réseau express métropolitain) were instructed by the Government of Quebec to develop a public transit plan for South Shore, with the potential of an extension of the Yellow Line. This follows proposals by Réseau de transport de Longueuil and ARTM to build a tramway. In January 2024, CDPQ Infra announced it was withdrawing its proposal to build a line on the South Shore, leaving the local mayors to coordinate with the soon-to-be created provincial government agency for large public transit projects.

=== Northern extension ===
An extension of the Yellow Line further into Longueuil could overload the interchange at Berri–UQAM, with a northern extension of the line proposed as mitigation by offering a connection to the Green Line at McGill.

In June 2008, the City of Montreal proposed a number of service improvements and Metro extensions, including extending the Yellow Line from Berri–UQAM to McGill station to ease congestion on that part of the Green Line. In 2018, Québec solidaire proposed a two station extension to McGill, to relieve congestion at Berri–UQAM and connect to the under construction Réseau express métropolitain.

== Service ==
=== Operation hours and frequency ===
The Yellow Line operates between 5:30 a.m. and 1:00 a.m on weekdays and Sunday, and between 5:30 a.m. and 1:30 a.m on Saturday. Trains arrive at stations every 3 to 5 minutes during rush hour, and every 5 to 10 minutes during off-peak periods and on weekends.

=== Rolling stock ===
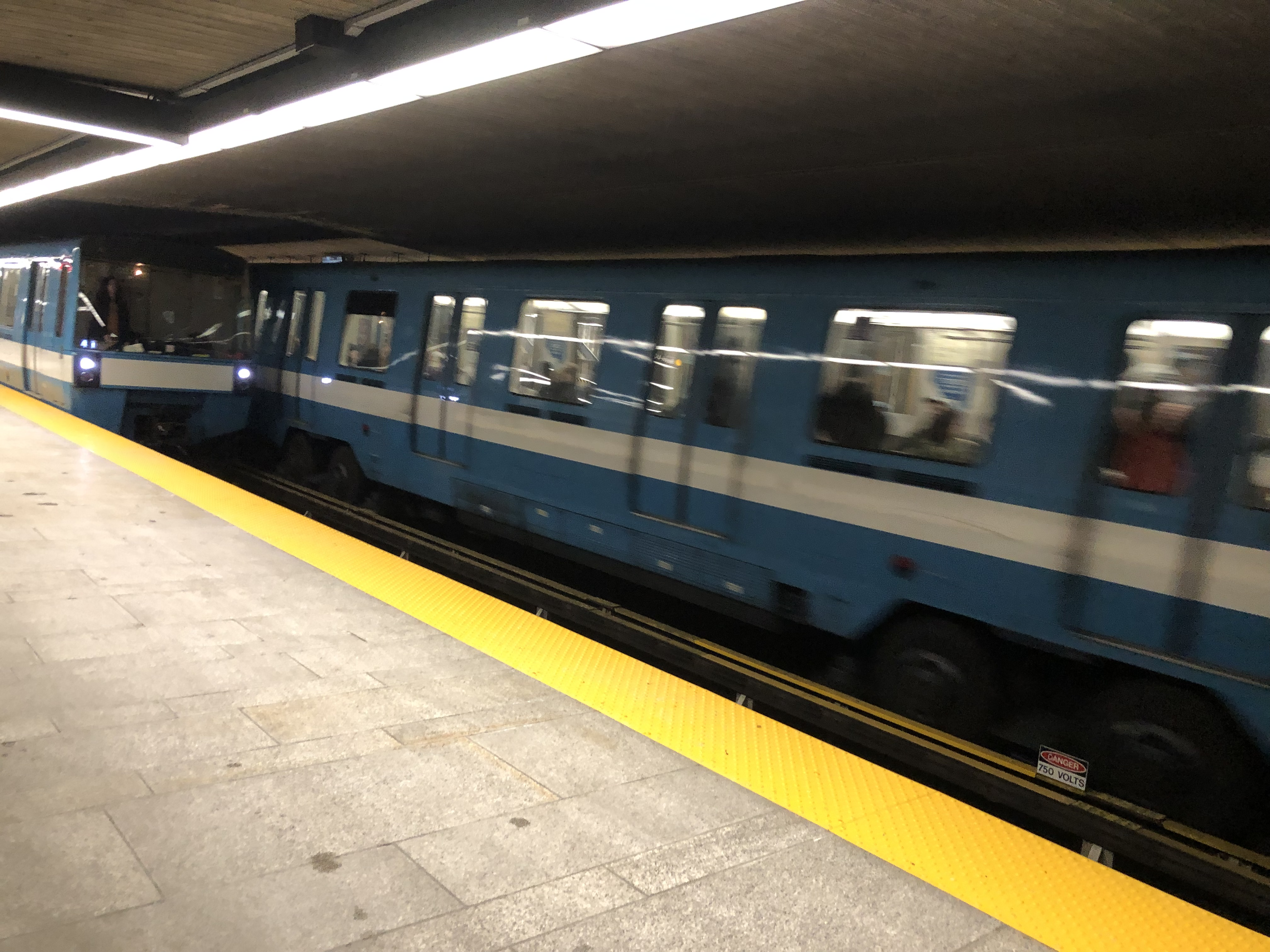
Two MR-73 trains at Jean-Drapeau Station.

At its opening in 1967, MR-63 cars were used on the Yellow Line. Upon the introduction of the MR-73 cars in 1976, they replaced the MR-63 cars on the line. In 2008, MR-63 cars were once again in use on the Yellow Line, but they began to be retired in 2017.

== List of stations ==
Station	Date opened	Odonym	Namesake	Distance (km)		Transfers/Connections	Location
Station	Date opened	Odonym	Namesake	Between stations	Total	Transfers/Connections	Location
Berri–UQAM	April 28, 1967	Berri Street	Simon Després dit Le Berry	–	0.0	Green Line; Orange Line; Gare d'autocars de Montréal	Ville-Marie
Berri–UQAM	April 28, 1967	Université du Québec à Montréal		–	0.0	Green Line; Orange Line; Gare d'autocars de Montréal	Ville-Marie
Jean-Drapeau	April 28, 1967	Parc Jean-Drapeau	Jean Drapeau (former mayor of Montreal)	2.4	2.4	STM: 767, 768, 777 STM: 292	Ville-Marie
Longueuil–Université-de-Sherbrooke	April 28, 1967	City of Longueuil		1.6	4.0	Terminus Longueuil	Longueuil
Longueuil–Université-de-Sherbrooke	April 28, 1967	Université de Sherbrooke	John Coape Sherbrooke (former Governor General of British North America)	1.6	4.0	Terminus Longueuil	Longueuil

== See also ==
- List of Montreal Metro stations
