= Exo Chambly-Richelieu-Carignan sector =

- Parent: Exo
- Founded: 2017
- Service area: Carignan, Quebec, Chambly, Quebec, Marieville, Quebec, Richelieu, Quebec, Saint-Mathias-sur-Richelieu
- Service type: bus service, paratransit, on-demand taxibus
- Routes: 17
- Destinations: Brossard, Longueuil, Saint-Jean-sur-Richelieu
- Hubs: Terminus Chambly, Terminus Brossard
- Annual ridership: 766,087 (2025)
- Website: exo.quebec/en/trip-planner/bus/CITCRC

The Exo Chambly-Richelieu-Carignan sector is the division of Exo that delivers bus service to the communities of Chambly, Richelieu and Carignan. This area is in southwestern Quebec, Canada, about 25 kilometres (16 mi) east of Montreal on the Richelieu River.

== History ==
From 1913 to 1956, commuter service to Montreal was provided by the Montreal and Southern Counties Railway with four stops in what is now Chambly.

The Conseil intermunicipal de transport Chambly-Richelieu-Carignan (CITCRC) was formed in 1984. In 1993 it was agreed to expand service to St-Mathias-sur-Richelieu, and in 1994 it was the turn of Marieville to join.

In 2000, the Agence métropolitaine de transport (predecessor to Exo and Autorité régionale de transport métropolitain) opened a park and ride in Chambly for commuters into Montreal.

Gestrans was contracted to manage the transportation system from 2008 through 2012 with Veolia Transport (formerly Connex) operating the buses, under an agreement that expired at the end of 2011.

In December 2011, the CIT network was expanded with local bus lines, using the park and ride as a terminus. In July 2012 a one-year pilot project was announced making these new local lines fare-free; only rides outside of the CIT territory would require a fare.

In October 2012, the CIT was rebranded to Blus (an acronym combining bus and plus), with a new visual identity. The fare-free pilot project was made permanent.

On June 1, 2017, a new law reorganizing public transit agencies in Greater Montreal abolished the CITs and established a new Réseau de transport métropolitain (RTM, later branded Exo), that, among other things, assumed the Blus responsibilities, assets and employees."L'objectif de la mobilité intégrée" (in French). La Presse. 2017-05-15.

When the Réseau express métropolitain started service between Montreal Central Station and Brossard in July 2023, Exo reorganized the bus network in the Chambly-Richelieu-Carignan sector. Bus routes that went to Terminus Centre-Ville or Terminus Panama now terminated at the new Brossard REM station. A new bus route numbering scheme was also implemented.

== Fares ==
As of July 1, 2024

The Chambly-Richelieu-Carignan sector is integrated in the Autorité régionale de transport métropolitain (ARTM)'s fare structure for Greater Montreal.

The territory of the sector is in fare zone C, with the exception of Marieville, which is in zone D.

- Travel within the sector is fare-free.
- Routes to Brossard or Longueuil (Zone B) require a All modes ABC or Bus fare that's valid for those zones.
- Routes to St-Jean-sur-Richelieu (Zone D) require All modes ABCD or Bus Out-of-Territory fare.

Beyond the standard ARTM fares, there are additional fares available for this sector:

- The CRC-SJU-VR-REM fare is valid on services in the Zone C of Chambly-Richelieu-Carignan, Sainte-Julie and Vallée-du-Richelieu sectors (thereby excluding Marieville), as well as the South Shore branch of the Réseau express métropolitain (REM).
- The CRC Marieville-REM is valid on all services in the Chambly-Richelieu-Carignan sector as well as the South Shore branch of the REM.

== Services ==
=== Local bus routes ===
Local routes
No.	Route	Connects to	Service times / notes
104	Chambly (Brassard - Martel - Gentilly)	Terminus Chambly	No peak service (delivered by line 106)
105	Chambly - Richelieu - Marieville	Terminus Chambly	Daily
106	Chambly (Brassard - Salaberry - Gentilly)	Terminus Chambly	Weekdays, peak only
107	Chambly (Anne-Le Seigneur - Salaberry - Brassard)	Terminus Chambly	Weekdays only
108	Taxibus Chambly - St-Mathias-sur-Richelieu	Terminus Chambly	Weekdays, peak only
109	Taxibus Chambly - Carignan - Saint-Hubert	Terminus Chambly	Weekdays, peak only

=== Express bus routes ===
Express bus routes
No.	Route	Connects to	Service times / notes
481	Chambly – Terminus Brossard	Brossard; Terminus Chambly	Daily
482	Chambly (Franquet–Fréchette) – Terminus Brossard	Brossard; Terminus Chambly	Weekdays, peak only
483	Carignan (Bellerive–Henriette) – Terminus Brossard	Brossard	Weekdays, peak only
484	Carignan (Île aux Lièvres) – Terminus Brossard	Brossard	Weekdays, peak only
485	Chambly (Franquet–Fréchette) – Terminus Brossard	Brossard	Weekdays, peak only
486	Marieville – Terminus Brossard	Brossard	Only two departures per direction, weekdays peak only
487	Chambly (Industriel) – Terminus Brossard	Brossard	Weekdays, peak only
488	Chambly (Daigneault – Martel) – Terminus Brossard	Brossard	Weekdays, peak only

=== Regional bus routes ===
Regional bus routes
No.	Route	Connects to	Service times / notes
680	Chambly - Terminus Longueuil	Longueuil–Université-de-Sherbrooke; Terminus Chambly	Weekend only
681	Chambly - Terminus Longueuil - Cégep É.-Montpetit	Longueuil–Université-de-Sherbrooke; Terminus Chambly	Weekdays only
685	Carignan - Chambly - Saint-Jean-sur-Richelieu	Terminus Chambly	Weekdays, peak only

== See also ==
- Exo (public transit) bus services
