= Montarville (disambiguation) =

Montarville is a federal riding in Canada.

Montarville may also refer to:

- Montarville (provincial electoral district), a provincial riding in Quebec
- Terminus De Montarville, a public bus terminus

== See also ==
- Saint-Bruno-de-Montarville, an off-island southshore suburb of Montreal, Quebec, Canada
