= Du Quartier station =

REM station in Brossard, Quebec, Canada

Du Quartier
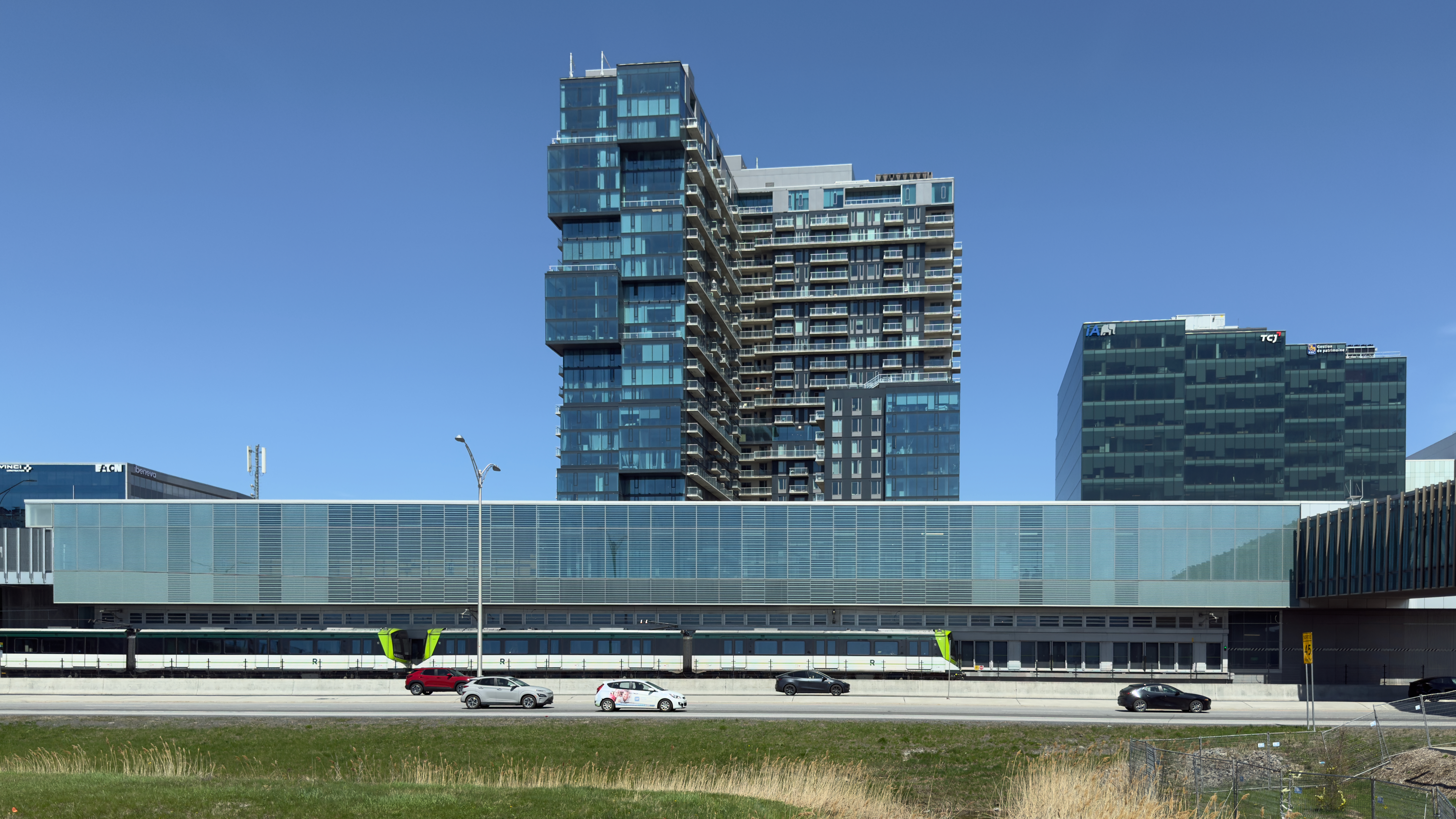
- Train arrives at platform 2, seen from across autoroute 10

General information
- Location: 2100 Éclipse Street; Brossard, Quebec; Canada
- Coordinates: 45°26′48″N 73°26′00″W
- Operator: Pulsar (AtkinsRéalis and Alstom)
- Platforms: 1 island platform
- Tracks: 2
- Connections: Réseau de transport de Longueuil

Construction
- Structure type: At-grade
- Parking: None
- Cycle facilities: 74 rack spaces
- Accessible: Yes

Other information
- Station code: DUQ
- Fare zone: ARTM: B

History
- Opened: 31 July 2023; 3 years ago

Services
Preceding station	REM	Following station
Panama toward Deux-Montagnes or Anse-à-l'Orme	Réseau express métropolitain	Brossard Terminus
Future services
Preceding station	REM	Following station
Panama toward Airport	Réseau express métropolitain (opens 2027)	Brossard Terminus
Location

Du Quartier (Canadian French: [d͡zy kaʁt͡sje]; French: [dy kaʁtje]) is a Réseau express métropolitain (REM) station in the city of Brossard, Quebec, Canada. It is operated by CDPQ Infra and serves as a station on the central (southern) branch of the REM. The opening for regular service was on 31 July 2023. It is immediately across from the Quartier DIX30, a lifestyle centre, located on the southern side of Quebec Autoroute 10, just to the southeast of Boulevard du Quartier overpass. It is connected to a large future transit-oriented development of around 4,000 people and 5,000 jobs.

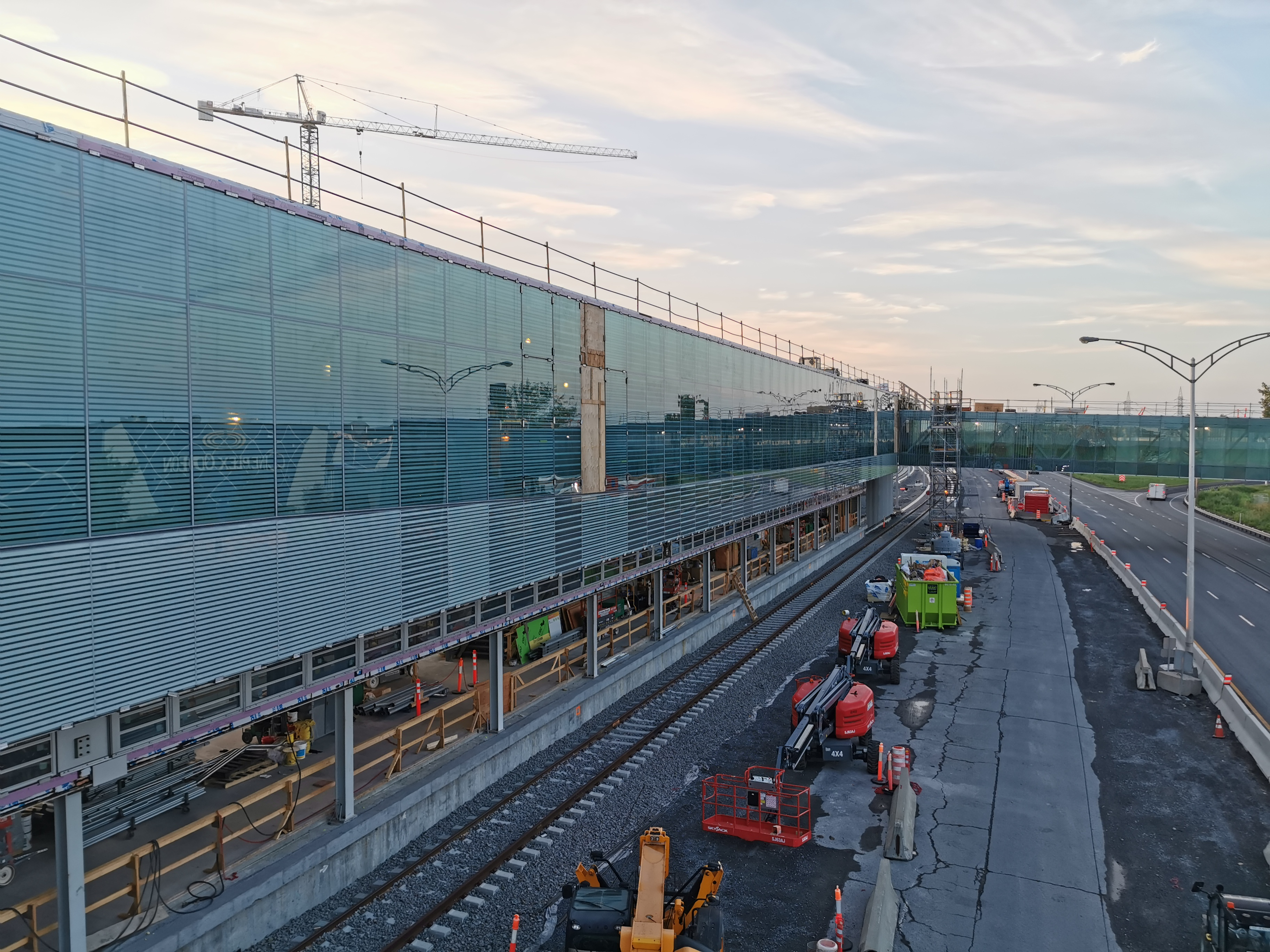
Station during construction (2020)

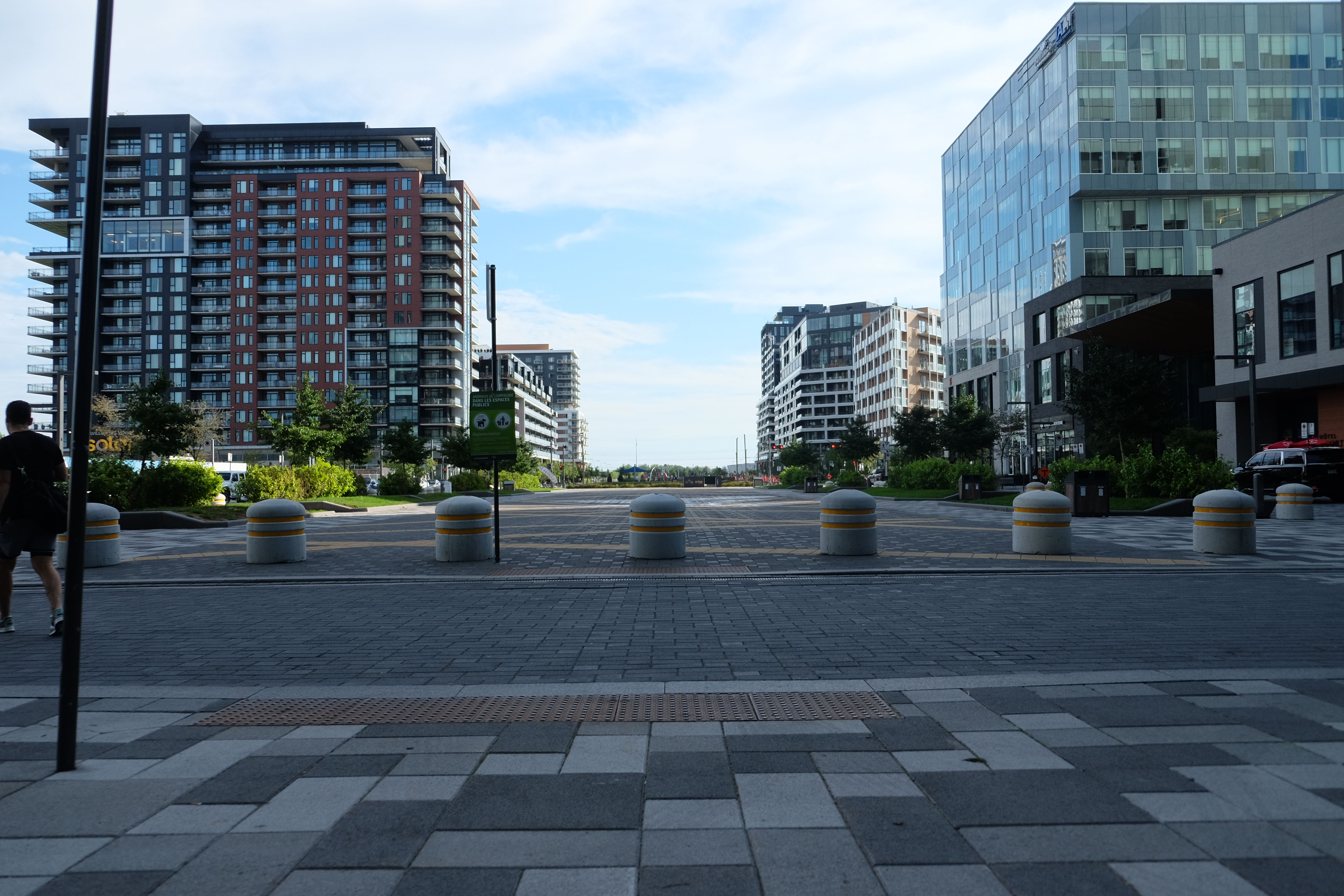
Just outside Du Quartier Station, looking towards Solar Uniquartier

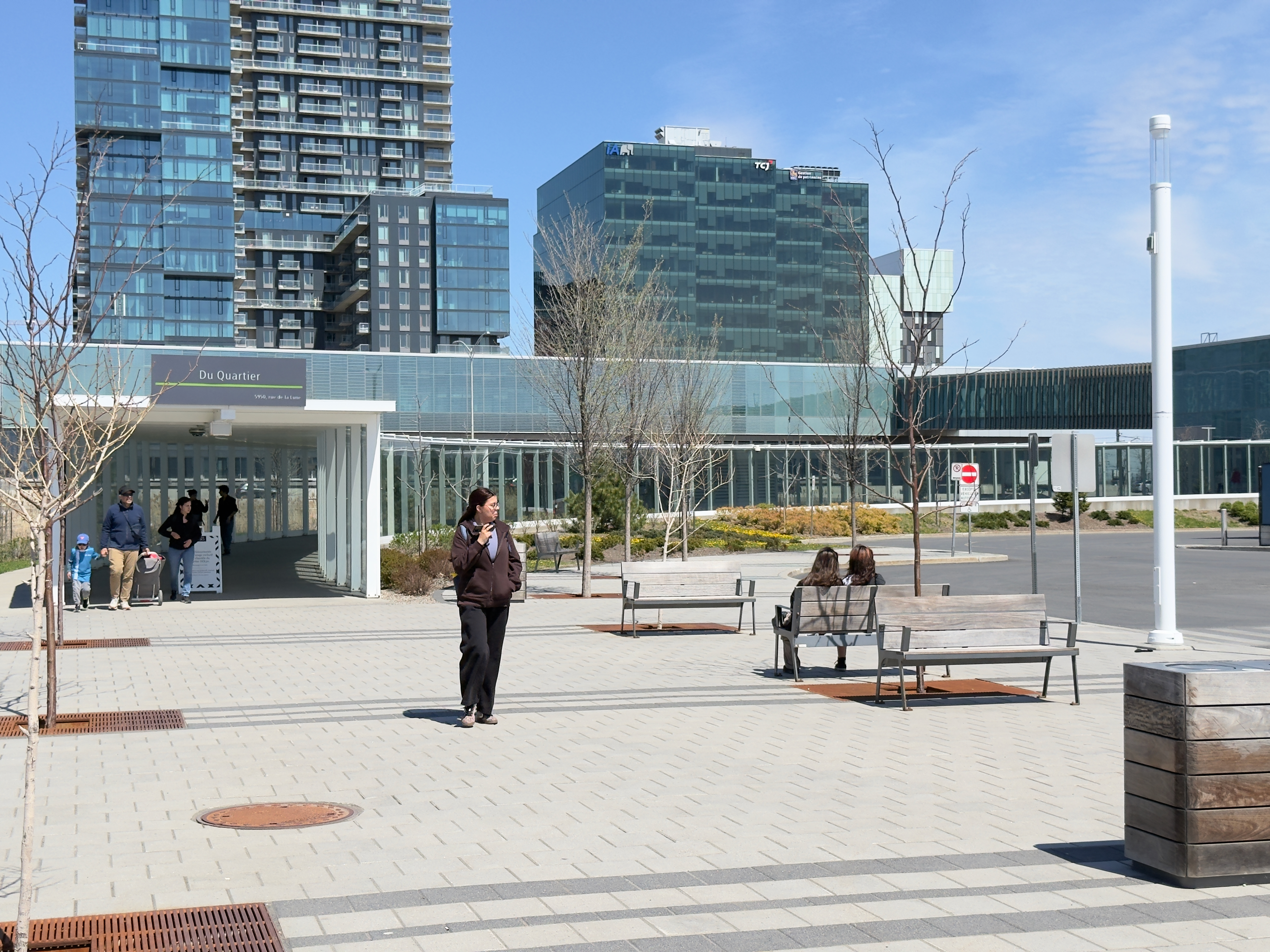
Station entrance from DIX30

== Connecting bus routes ==
Réseau de transport de Longueuil
No.	Route name	Connects to	Service times / notes
4 ♿︎	Taschereau / Payer / DIX30	Longueuil–Université-de-Sherbrooke; Brossard	Daily
21 ♿︎	Grande-Allée / du Quartier	Longueuil–Université-de-Sherbrooke	Daily
32	Secteur B Brossard / Mountainview	Brossard	Daily
38 ♿︎	Chevrier / Secteur B Brossard	Panama; Brossard	Daily
132	DIX30 / Parc de la Cité / Mountainview	Brossard	Daily
720	Interstation Rive-Sud	Île-des-Sœurs; Panama; Brossard	Used in case of a service disruption on the REM between Île-des-Soeurs station, Panama station, Du Quartier station & Brossard station
725	Brossard – Du Quartier – Terminus Longueuil / Métro Longueuil-Université-de-Sherbrook	Longueuil–Université-de-Sherbrooke; Brossard	Used in case of a service disruption on the REM
TA ♿︎	RTL Transport adapté		
