= Brossard station =

REM station in Brossard, Quebec, Canada

Brossard
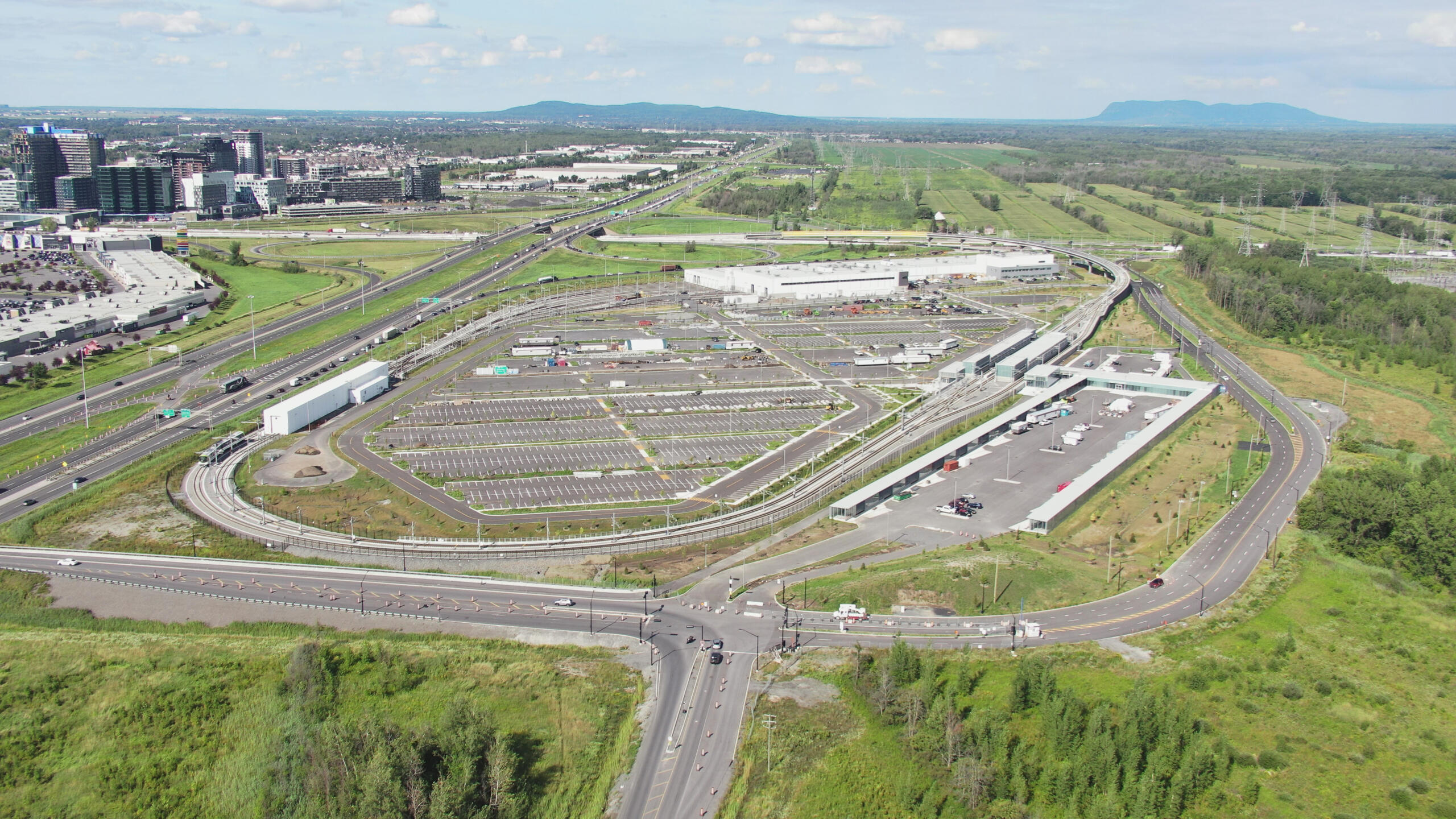
- Brossard station complex

General information
- Location: 8200 Rome Boulevard; Brossard, Quebec; Canada
- Coordinates: 45°26′17″N 73°25′48″W
- Operator: Pulsar (AtkinsRéalis and Alstom)
- Platforms: 1 island platform, 1 side platform
- Tracks: 3
- Bus stands: 21
- Connections: Réseau de transport de Longueuil; Exo bus services; Saint-Jean-sur-Richelieu public transit

Construction
- Structure type: Embankment
- Parking: 2,948 spaces
- Cycle facilities: 50 rack spaces
- Accessible: Yes

Other information
- Station code: RIV
- Fare zone: ARTM: B

History
- Opened: 31 July 2023; 3 years ago

Services
Preceding station	REM	Following station
Du Quartier toward Deux-Montagnes or Anse-à-l'Orme	Réseau express métropolitain	Terminus
Future services
Preceding station	REM	Following station
Du Quartier toward Airport	Réseau express métropolitain (opens 2027)	Terminus
Track layout
Location

Brossard (Canadian French: [bʁɔsɑːʁ, bʁɔsɑɔ̯ʁ], French: [bʁɔsaʁ]; known as Rive-Sud during early development) is a Réseau express métropolitain (REM) station in the city of Brossard, Quebec, Canada. Located approximately 200 metres (660 ft) south of the intersection of Autoroutes 10 and 30, in the uninhabited Y section of Brossard, the station is the only elevated station on the South Shore segment and is operated by CDPQ Infra; it serves as the southern terminus of the REM and the eastern-most subway stop in Canada.

The station is equipped with a large regional bus terminal for Exo buses, as well as 2,948-space parking lot. The station is adjacent to the operations and maintenance centre for the REM. It is accessible via de Rome Boulevard. The station opened on 31 July 2023. With the opening of Brossard in 2023, the long-time park and ride lot Brossard-Chevrier, located on the opposite side of the Autoroute 10/30 interchange, closed.

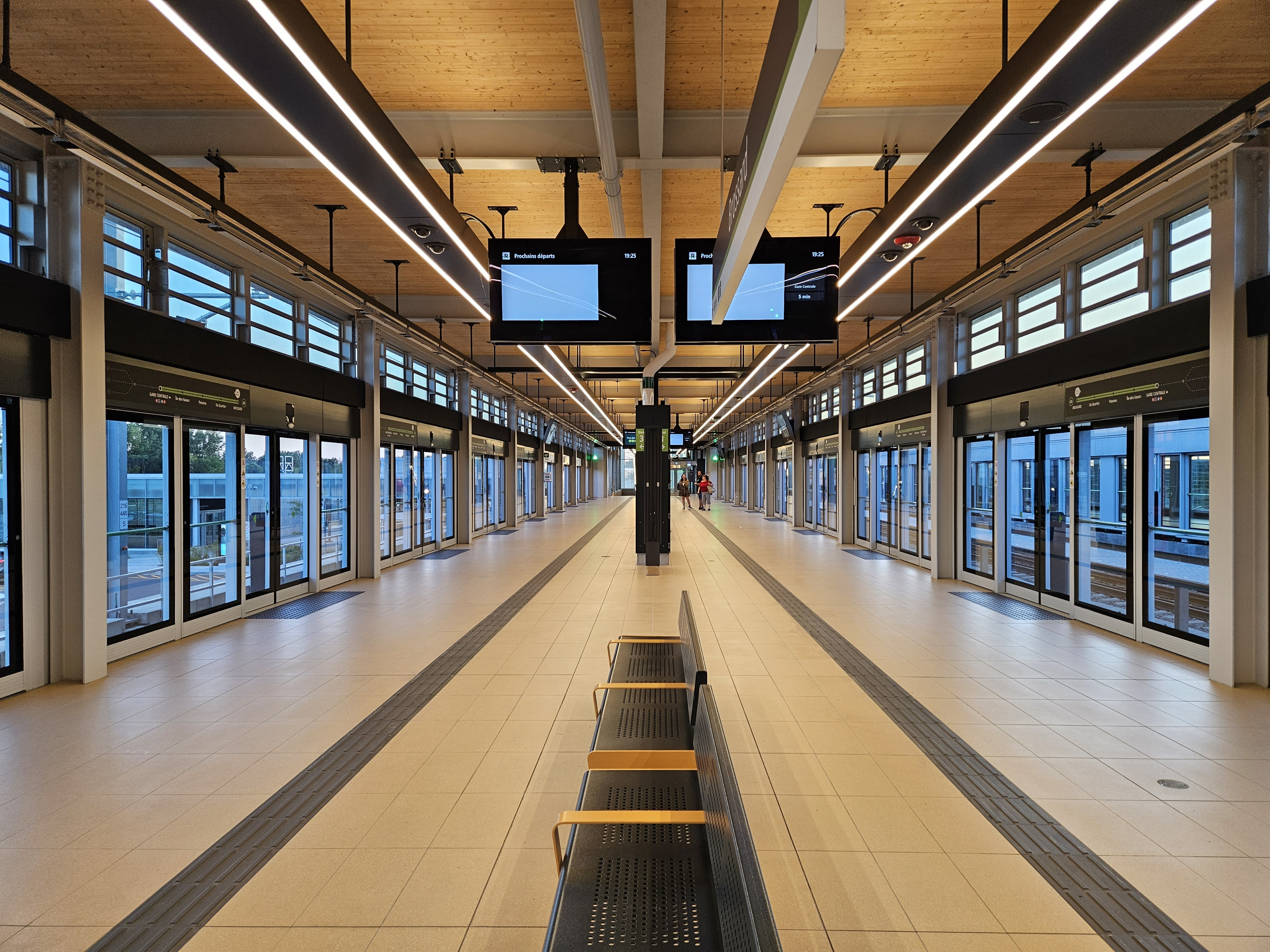
Platforms 3 (left) and 1 (right) at the station

== Artwork ==
The station has two bronze sculptures titled Les passagers (The passengers) by artist David Armstrong VI located next to the entrance of the station. This work was unveiled in September 2024.

== Terminus Brossard ==
Brossard station has an ARTM bus terminal called Terminus Brossard, with 21 platforms. A total of 26 bus lines go to the station.

Réseau de transport de Longueuil
No.	Route	Connects to	Service times / notes	Terminus wing and gate
4 ♿︎	Taschereau / Payer / DIX30	Longueuil–Université-de-Sherbrooke; Du Quartier	Daily	A6
14 ♿︎	Rome / DIX30	Longueuil–Université-de-Sherbrooke	Weekdays only	A6
32 ♿︎	Secteur B Brossard / Mountainview	Du Quartier	Daily	A9
38 ♿︎	Chevrier / Secteur B Brossard	Panama	Daily	A7
44	Secteurs M-N-O Brossard	Panama	Daily	
114 ♿︎	Station Brossard / de Rome / St-Laurent	Panama	Daily	
132	DIX30 / Parc de la Cité / Mountainview	Du Quartier	Daily	A9
720	Interstation Rive-Sud	Île-des-Soeurs; Panama; Du Quartier	Used in case of a service disruption on the REM between Île-des-Soeurs station, Panama station, Du Quartier station & Brossard station	B20
725	Brossard – Du Quartier – Terminus Longueuil / Métro Longueuil-Université-de-Sherbrook	Longueuil–Université-de-Sherbrooke; Du Quartier	Used in case of a service disruption on the REM	
TA ♿︎	RTL Transport adapté			P2-22
Exo Vallée-du-Richelieu sector
No.	Route	Connects to	Service times / notes	Terminus wing and gate
300	Saint-Hyacinthe – Terminus Brossard	Mont-Saint-Hilaire	Weekdays only	A4
Exo Richelain / Roussillon sector
No.	Route	Connects to	Service times / notes	Terminus wing and gate
450	La Prairie (Magdeleine) – Terminus Brossard		Weekdays, peak only	B18
451	La Prairie (Briqueterie) – Terminus Brossard		Weekdays, peak only	B17
452	La Prairie (Symbiocité–Briqueterie) – Terminus Brossard		Weekdays, peak only	B17
454	Candiac (Charlemagne) – Terminus Brossard		Weekdays, peak only	B17
455	Candiac (Deauville) – Terminus Brossard		Weekdays, peak only	B19
456	Candiac (Fouquet) – Terminus Brossard		Weekdays, peak only	B18
457	Saint-Philippe – Terminus Brossard		Weekdays, peak only	B18
552	Saint-Constant – Delson – Terminus Brossard	Sainte-Catherine	Weekdays, peak only	B19
554	Delson – Terminus Brossard	Terminus Georges-Gagné	Weekdays, peak only	B16
Exo Chambly-Richelieu-Carignan sector
No.	Route	Connects to	Service times / notes	Terminus wing and gate
481	Chambly – Terminus Brossard	Terminus Chambly	Daily	B13
482	Chambly (Franquet–Fréchette) – Terminus Brossard	Terminus Chambly	Weekdays, peak only	B13
483	Carignan (Bellerive–Henriette) – Terminus Brossard		Weekdays, peak only	B3
484	Carignan (Île aux Lièvres) – Terminus Brossard		Weekdays, peak only	B3
485	Chambly (Franquet–Fréchette) – Terminus Brossard		Weekdays, peak only	B15
486	Marieville – Terminus Brossard		Only two departures per direction, weekdays peak only	A3
487	Chambly (Industriel) – Terminus Brossard		Weekdays, peak only	B15
488	Chambly (Daigneault – Martel) – Terminus Brossard		Weekdays, peak only	B15
Exo Sainte-Julie sector
No.	Route	Connects to	Service times / notes	Terminus wing and gate
600	Sainte-Julie – Terminus Brossard	Terminus Sainte-Julie	Weekdays only	A5
Exo Transport adapté
No.	Route	Connects to	Service times / notes	Terminus wing and gate
TA ♿︎	Exo Transport adapté			P2-22
Saint-Jean-sur-Richelieu public transit
No.	Route	Connects to	Service times / notes	Terminus wing and gate
96 E	Saint-Jean-sur-Richelieu		Weekdays; express	B14
96 S	Saint-Jean-sur-Richelieu		Weekdays, peak only; super express	B14
