= Île-des-Soeurs station =

REM station in Montreal, Quebec, Canada

Île-des-Soeurs
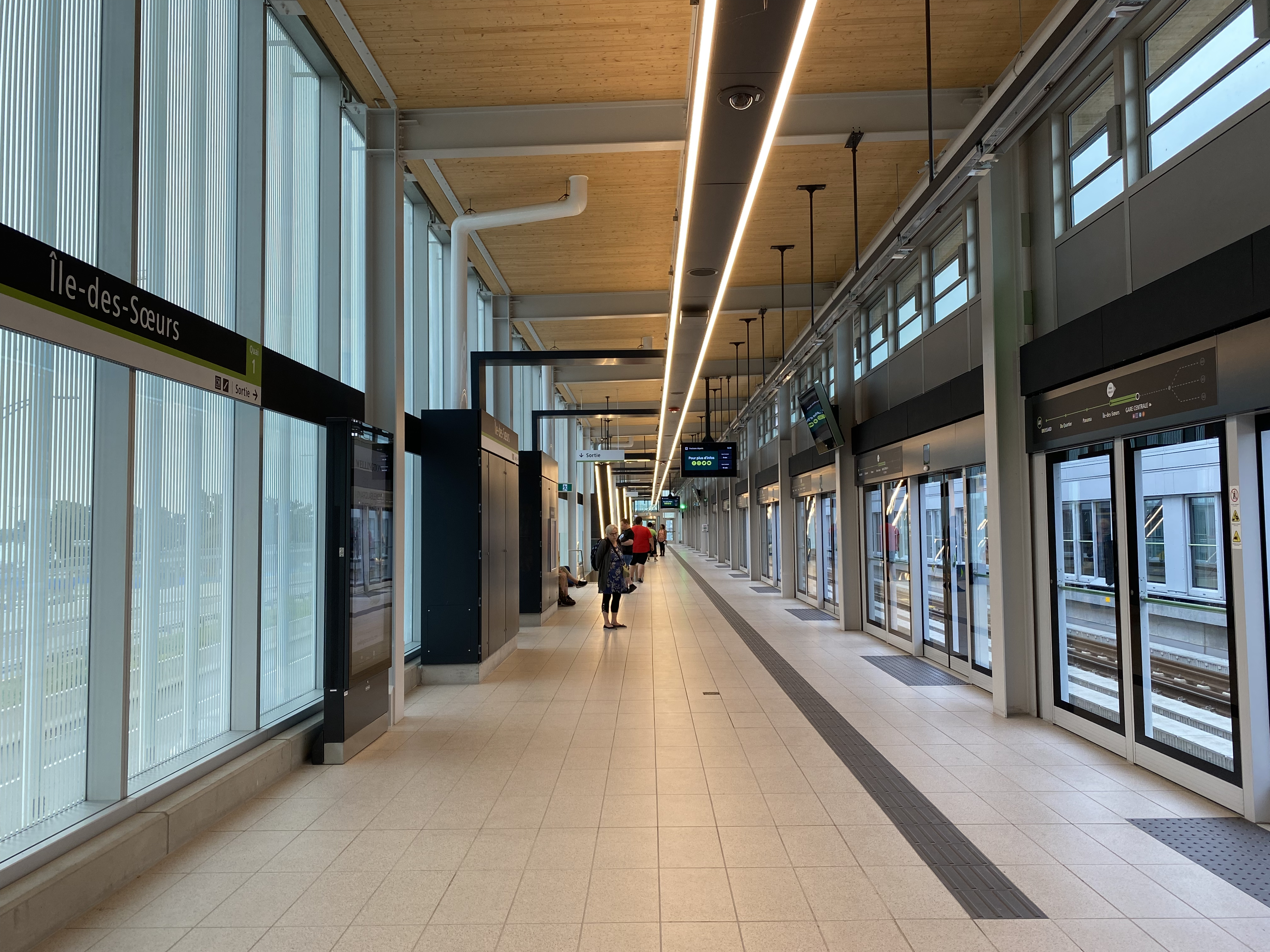
- Platform towards Central Station

General information
- Location: 900 René-Lévesque Boulevard; Verdun, Quebec; Canada
- Coordinates: 45°28′14″N 73°32′16″W
- Operator: Pulsar (AtkinsRéalis and Alstom)
- Platforms: 2 side platforms
- Tracks: 2
- Connections: STM bus

Construction
- Structure type: Elevated
- Parking: No
- Cycle facilities: 60 rack spaces
- Accessible: Yes

Other information
- Station code: IDS
- Fare zone: ARTM: A

History
- Opened: 31 July 2023; 3 years ago

Services
Preceding station	REM	Following station
Central Station toward Deux-Montagnes or Anse-à-l'Orme	Réseau express métropolitain	Panama toward Brossard
Future services
Preceding station	REM	Following station
Central Station toward Airport	Réseau express métropolitain (opens 2027)	Panama toward Brossard
Location

Île-des-Soeurs (officially Île-des-Sœurs, pronounced [ildesœʁ]) is a Réseau express métropolitain (REM) station on Nuns' Island in Montreal's borough of Verdun. It is operated by CDPQ Infra and serves as a station on the South Shore branch of the REM.

It is located between the headquarters of Bell Canada (to the north) and the Place du Commerce shopping centre (to the south) atop Highway 10/A 15. It opened on 31 July 2023.

== Connecting bus routes ==
Société de transport de Montréal
No.	Route	Connects to	Service times / notes
12	Île-des-Soeurs	De l'Église	Daily
168	Cité-du-Havre	Square-Victoria-OACI; McGill	Daily
172	Du Golf		Weekdays only
176	Berlioz		Daily
568	Navette REM - Gare Centrale / Île-des-Soeurs	Gare Centrale	Used in case of a service disruption on the REM
872	Île-des-Soeurs Shuttle	McGill; Square-Victoria-OACI	Weekdays, peak only Created to act as a temporary measure until the opening of the entire REM network
TA ♿︎	STM Transport adapté		
Réseau de transport de Longueuil
No.	Route	Connects to	Service times / notes
720	Interstation Rive-Sud	Panama; Du Quartier; Brossard	Used in case of a service disruption on the REM
TA ♿︎	RTL Transport adapté		
