= Exo Sainte-Julie sector =

Public transportation service

- Parent: Exo
- Founded: 2017
- Service area: Sainte-Julie, Quebec
- Service type: bus service, paratransit, on-demand taxibus
- Routes: 11
- Destinations: Brossard, Longueuil, Montreal
- Hubs: Terminus Sainte-Julie, Terminus Longueuil
- Annual ridership: 529,498 (2024)
- Website: exo.quebec/en/trip-planner/bus/CITCRC

The Exo Sainte-Julie sector is the division of Exo that delivers bus service for the city of Sainte-Julie in southwestern Quebec, Canada. This municipality is located in the Marguerite-D'Youville Regional County Municipality, about 25 kilometres (16 mi), southeast of downtown Montreal.

The Marguerite-D'Youville Regional County Municipality manages the transportation for people with disabilities within the Region. To be eligible for this service, one must complete the application form and be approved.

== Services ==
=== Local bus routes ===
Local routes
| No. | Route | Connects to | Service times / notes |
|---|---|---|---|
| 1 | Sainte-Julie (des Hauts-Bois) | Terminus Sainte-Julie | Daily |
| 3 | Sainte-Julie (Principale) | Terminus Sainte-Julie | Weekdays, peak only |
| 4 | Sainte-Julie (Abbé-Théoret) | Terminus Sainte-Julie | Weekdays, peak only |
| 5 | Sainte-Julie (N.P.-Lapierre) | Terminus Sainte-Julie | Weekdays, peak only |
| 8 | Sainte-Julie (north sector) | Terminus Sainte-Julie | Daily |
| 30 | Sainte-Julie - Saint-Hyacinthe | Terminus Sainte-Julie | Weekdays, peak only |

=== Express / regional bus routes ===
Express / regional routes
| No. | Route | Connects to | Service times / notes |
|---|---|---|---|
| 325 | Express Longueuil / Cégep | Longueuil–Université-de-Sherbrooke; Terminus Sainte-Julie | Weekdays only |
| 330 | Express Longueuil - CFP - Cégep | Longueuil–Université-de-Sherbrooke; Terminus Sainte-Julie | Only two departures per direction, weekdays peak only |
| 340 | Express Longueuil - Promenades Saint-Bruno | Longueuil–Université-de-Sherbrooke; Terminus Sainte-Julie | Weekends only |
| 350 | Express Longueuil | Longueuil–Université-de-Sherbrooke; Terminus Sainte-Julie | Daily |
| 600 | Sainte-Julie - Terminus Brossard | Brossard; Terminus Sainte-Julie | Weekdays only |

== See also ==
- Exo bus services
- List of park and rides in Greater Montreal
