= CN Sports Complex =

Multipurpose sports facility in Quebec, Canada

- French: Complexe Sportif CN
- Interactive map of CN Sports Complex
- Former names: Bell Sports Complex
- Address: 8000 Boul. Leduc #104; Brossard, Quebec; Canada
- Coordinates: 45.452725°N 73.445191°W
- Current use: Official practice facility for the Montreal Canadiens

Construction
- Opened: December 12, 2008

Tenant
- Montreal Canadiens (practice rink)

Website
- Official website

The CN Sports Complex (French: Complexe Sportif CN) formerly known as the Bell Sports Complex is a multipurpose sports facility located in Brossard, Quebec, Canada. Situated near Quebec Autoroute 10 and the Quartier Dix30 lifestyle center, the primary function of the CN Sports Complex is to serve as the official practice facility of the Montreal Canadiens National Hockey League team. It opened on December 12, 2008, and features two ice hockey rinks and one indoor soccer pitch. On August 15, 2023 Canadian National Railway acquired the naming rights.

== Soccer ==
| Date | Winning Team | Score | Opponent | Attendance |
|---|---|---|---|---|
| April 1, 2011 | McGill University (Canada) | 2–1 | (Canada) Montreal Impact | |

== See also ==
- Bell Centre
