= Réseau de transport de Longueuil =

Public transit system in Longueuil, Quebec

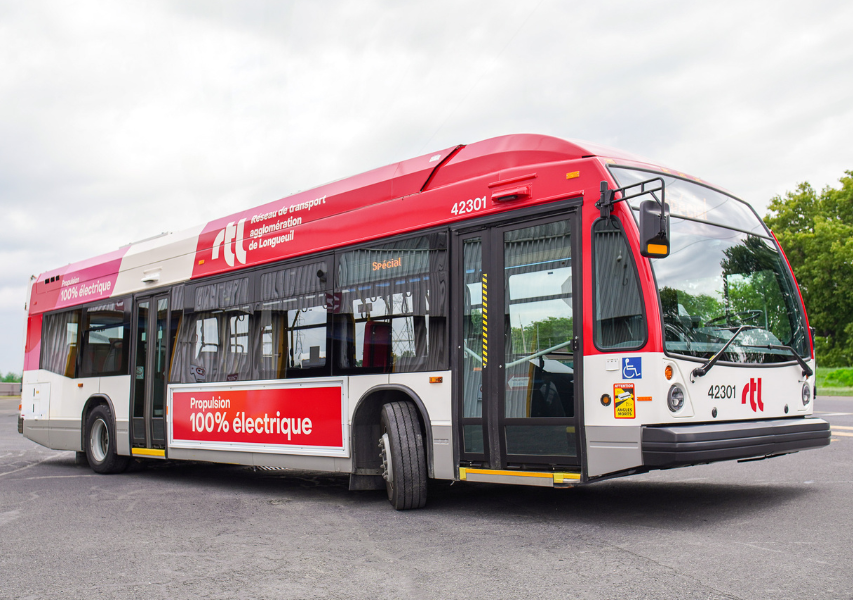
- Founded: 1974
- Headquarters: 1150, boul. Marie-Victorin
- Locale: Longueuil, Quebec
- Service area: Boucherville, Brossard, Longueuil (Greenfield Park, Lemoyne, Saint-Hubert), Saint-Lambert, Saint-Bruno-de-Montarville
- Service type: Bus service, paratransit, school bus service, on-demand transit
- Alliance: Autorité régionale de transport métropolitain (ARTM)
- Routes: 154 bus, 12 taxi
- Stops: 3,366 (661 shelters)
- Fleet: 493 buses (2021)
- Daily ridership: 133,537 (2013)
- Annual ridership: 34,447,686 (2013)
- Chief executive: Alain Dufort (2024)
- Website: RTL English-language website

Réseau de transport de Longueuil (French pronunciation: [ʁezo də tʁɑ̃spɔʁ də lɔ̃ɡœj], RTL; English: Longueuil Transit Network) is a public transit system in the city of Longueuil, Quebec, Canada, and nearby communities on the South Shore of Montreal. The RTL had an annual ridership of 34,447,686 in 2013.

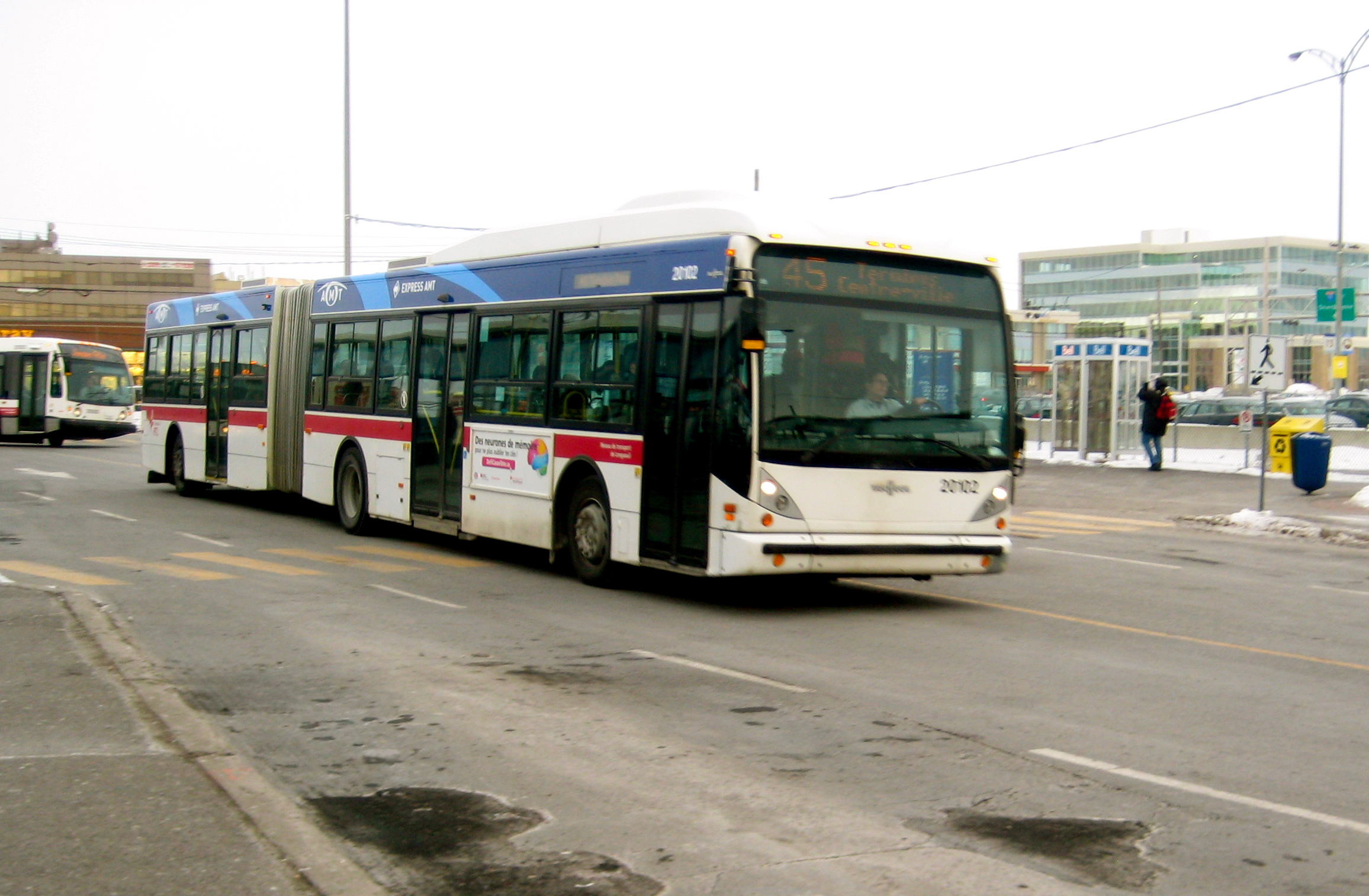
An RTL Van Hool AG300 on former route 45 at Terminus Panama.

== History ==
RTL was officially inaugurated on July 1, 1974, as Commission de transport de la Rive-Sud de Montréal (CTRSM), replacing the former privately owned company Chambly Transport. It served the former communities of Boucherville, Brossard, Greenfield Park, Longueuil, LeMoyne, Saint-Hubert, Saint-Lambert and Notre-Dame-du-Sacré-Cœur (later annexed to Brossard in 1978). From 1985 until 2002 it was named Société de transport de la Rive-Sud de Montréal (STRSM).

Logo of the RTL from 2002 to 2025.

Following the municipal mergers in 2002, the name officially changed to Société de transport de Longueuil. Its marketing name is Réseau de transport de Longueuil, to avoid confusion with the Société de transport de Laval.

Some of the "former" municipalities demerged (broke away) from the city of Longueuil on January 1, 2006, as the result of referendums. However, demerged municipalities continue to be served by and to contribute financially to the RTL, since they still belong to the urban agglomeration of Longueuil.

== Bus stations served ==
=== Bus terminus ===
- Terminus Panama
- Terminus Centre-Ville
- Terminus Longueuil
- Terminus De Montarville
- Terminus Radisson

=== Park-and-ride lots ===
- De Mortagne Park-n-Ride (Boucherville, rue Ampère, exit 92 off Autoroute 20, 45.572641°N 73.443539°W)
  - Exo Line 61
- Seigneurial Park-n-Ride (Saint-Bruno, corner boul. Seigneurial and Route 116, 45.514219°N 73.344995°W)
  - RTL Lines 98, 99, 192, 199

=== Individual Montreal metro stations ===
- Bonaventure metro station accessed from Terminus Centre-Ville
- Longueuil–Université-de-Sherbrooke metro station accessed from Terminus Longueuil
- Papineau metro station
- Radisson metro station

=== Commuter rail stations along Mont-Saint-Hilaire line ===
- Saint-Lambert Railway Station
  - RTL Lines 1, 6, 55, 106
- Saint-Hubert Railway Station
  - RTL Lines 8, 22, 28, 88
- Saint-Bruno Railway Station
  - RTL Lines 91, 92

== Routes ==
No.	Route	Connects to	Service times / notes
1 ♿︎	Desaulniers / Victoria / Windsor	Longueuil–Université-de-Sherbrooke; Saint-Lambert	Daily
3 ♿︎	Secteur Laflèche	Longueuil–Université-de-Sherbrooke	Daily
4 ♿︎	Taschereau / Payer / DIX30	Longueuil–Université-de-Sherbrooke; Du Quartier; Brossard	Daily
5	Auteuil / mtée St-Hubert / Maisonneuve	Bonaventure; Panama; Gare Centrale; Terminus Centre-Ville	Daily
6 ♿︎	Victoria	Longueuil–Université-de-Sherbrooke; Panama; Saint-Lambert	Daily
8 ♿︎	ch. Chambly / Cousineau / Promenades St-Bruno	Longueuil–Université-de-Sherbrooke; Longueuil–Saint-Hubert	Daily
9	Secteurs L-M St-Hubert	Longueuil–Université-de-Sherbrooke	Weekdays, peak only
10 ♿︎	Roland-Therrien / Belcourt	Longueuil–Université-de-Sherbrooke	Weekends only
13 ♿︎	Riverside / Secteurs P-V Brossard	Longueuil–Université-de-Sherbrooke; Panama	Daily
14 ♿︎	Rome / DIX30	Longueuil–Université-de-Sherbrooke; Brossard	Weekdays only
15 ♿︎	Riverside / Alexandra / Churchill	Longueuil–Université-de-Sherbrooke; Panama	Daily
16	Nobert / Antoinette-Robidoux / Adoncour	Longueuil–Université-de-Sherbrooke	Daily
17 ♿︎	Roland-Therrien / Roberval	Longueuil–Université-de-Sherbrooke	Weekends only
19	Davis	Longueuil–Université-de-Sherbrooke	Daily
20	Jean-Paul-Vincent / Beauharnois	Longueuil–Université-de-Sherbrooke	Daily
21 ♿︎	Grande-Allée / du Quartier	Longueuil–Université-de-Sherbrooke; Du Quartier	Daily
22	Gare Longueuil - St-Hubert/Sect. B Vieux-Longueuil	Longueuil–Saint-Hubert; De Mortagne park and ride	Weekdays, peak only
23	Ste-Hélène / Jacques-Cartier	Longueuil–Université-de-Sherbrooke	Weekdays and Saturday only
25	Parcs industriels Vieux-Longueuil / Boucherville	Longueuil–Université-de-Sherbrooke	Daily
28 ♿︎	ch. Chambly / Savane / ENA	Longueuil–Université-de-Sherbrooke	Daily
29 ♿︎	Collectivité Nouvelle	Longueuil–Université-de-Sherbrooke	Daily
30	Secteurs P-V Brossard	Panama	Weekdays, peak only
32	Secteur B Brossard / Mountainview	Du Quartier; Brossard	Daily
33	Secteurs M-N-O Brossard	Panama	Daily
34	Secteur A Brossard / Bellevue	Panama	Weekdays, peak only
37	Simard / du Béarn	Panama	Weekdays, peak only
38 ♿︎	Chevrier / Secteur B Brossard	Panama; Du Quartier; Brossard	Daily
42	Gaétan-Boucher / Parc de la Cité	Panama	Daily
44	Secteurs M-N-O Brossard	Panama; Brossard	Daily
47 ♿︎	Secteurs R-S-T Brossard	Panama	Daily
50	Bienville / Orchard / Prince-Charles	Panama	Daily
55	Victoria / Wellington	Bonaventure; Gare Centrale; Saint-Lambert; Terminus Centre-Ville	Weekdays, peak only
59	Montgomery / Gareau	Panama	Weekdays, peak only
60 ♿︎	Milan / Gaétan-Boucher / Promenades St-Bruno	Panama	Weekdays only
61	Boucherville / Terminus Radisson	Radisson; Terminus De Montarville; De Mortagne park and ride	Daily
71	Curé-Poirier	Longueuil–Université-de-Sherbrooke	Daily
73	Joliette / de Lyon	Longueuil–Université-de-Sherbrooke	Daily
74 ♿︎	St-Laurent / Secteur Bellerive	Longueuil–Université-de-Sherbrooke	Daily
75	Quinn / Brébeuf	Longueuil–Université-de-Sherbrooke	Daily
76 ♿︎	Roland-Therrien / Roberval	Longueuil–Université-de-Sherbrooke	Weekdays only
77 ♿︎	Taschereau / Coteau-Rouge / Cégep É.-Montpetit	Panama	Daily
78	Adoncour / du Colisée	Longueuil–Université-de-Sherbrooke	Weekdays, peak only
80 ♿︎	De Montarville / Carrefour de la Rive-Sud	Longueuil–Université-de-Sherbrooke; Terminus De Montarville	Daily
81	du Fort-St-Louis / Marie-Victorin	Longueuil–Université-de-Sherbrooke	Daily
82	Marie-Victorin / du Fort-St-Louis	Longueuil–Université-de-Sherbrooke; Terminus De Montarville	Weekdays, peak only
83	De Montarville / Samuel-De Champlain	Longueuil–Université-de-Sherbrooke	Daily
84	Samuel-De Champlain / De Montarville	Longueuil–Université-de-Sherbrooke	Weekdays only
85	Îles-Percées / de Mortagne / de Gascogne	Longueuil–Université-de-Sherbrooke; Terminus De Montarville	Weekdays, peak only
86	Samuel-De Champlain / De Montarville / TCV	Bonaventure; Gare Centrale; Terminus Centre-Ville	Weekdays, peak only
88 ♿︎	ch. Chambly / Mountainview	Longueuil–Université-de-Sherbrooke; Longueuil–Saint-Hubert	Daily
93	Gare St-Bruno / Montarville / Y.-Duckett	Saint-Bruno	Weekdays, peak only
98	Parc industriel St-Bruno / Parent	Longueuil–Université-de-Sherbrooke	Weekdays only
99	Promenades St-Bruno / Saint-Bruno-de-Montarville	Longueuil–Université-de-Sherbrooke; Seigneurial park and ride	Daily
114 ♿︎	Station Brossard / de Rome / St-Laurent	Brossard; Panama	Daily
120	Fernand-Lafontaine / Stationnement de Mortagne	Longueuil–Université-de-Sherbrooke; De Mortagne park and ride	Weekdays, peak only
123	Jacques-Cartier / Parcs industriels	Longueuil–Université-de-Sherbrooke	Daily
125	Pratt & Whitney / Lumenpulse	Longueuil–Université-de-Sherbrooke	Weekdays, peak only
128	Zone aéroportuaire / Parc industriel St-Bruno	Longueuil–Université-de-Sherbrooke; Longueuil–Saint-Hubert	Weekdays, peak only
132	DIX30 / Parc de la Cité / Mountainview	Du Quartier; Brossard	Daily
160 ♿︎	Milan / Gaétan-Boucher / Centre-ville St-Bruno	Panama; Seigneurial park and ride	Daily
161	R.-Therrien / J.-Cartier / De Montarville	Longueuil–Université-de-Sherbrooke; Terminus De Montarville; De Mortagne park and ride	Daily
170	Station Papineau / Ste-Hélène / J.-Cartier	Papineau	Weekdays, peak only
180	De Montarville / des Sureaux	Longueuil–Université-de-Sherbrooke; Terminus De Montarville	Weekdays only
185	Ampère / Gay-Lussac	Longueuil–Université-de-Sherbrooke; De Mortagne park and ride	Weekdays, peak only
199	Seigneurial / Grand Boulevard	Longueuil–Université-de-Sherbrooke; Seigneurial park and ride	Weekdays, peak only
284	Navette Boucherville		Weekdays only
287	Samuel-De Champlain / De Montarville / TCV	Bonaventure; Gare Centrale; Terminus Centre-Ville	Two AM departures towards Montreal only
410	Express Roland-Therrien / Belcourt	Longueuil–Université-de-Sherbrooke	Weekdays only
417	Express Roland-Therrien / Roberval	Longueuil–Université-de-Sherbrooke	Weekdays only
421 ♿︎	Grande-Allée / A.-Frappier	Longueuil–Université-de-Sherbrooke	Weekdays only
428	Zone aéroportuaire / Aéroport MET	Longueuil–Université-de-Sherbrooke; Longueuil–Saint-Hubert	Daily Connects to Montreal Metropolitan Airport
442	Cousineau / Pacific	Longueuil–Université-de-Sherbrooke; Longueuil–Saint-Hubert	Weekdays, peak only
461	Express de Touraine / de Montarville / Radisson	Radisson; De Mortagne park and ride; De Touraine park and ride	Daily
462	Touraine-Mortagne-Radisson-HMR-Inst.cardio	Radisson; De Mortagne park and ride; De Touraine park and ride	Weekdays, peak only
720	Interstation Rive-Sud	Île-des-Sœurs; Panama; Du Quartier; Brossard	Used in case of a service disruption on the REM between Île-des-Soeurs station, Panama station, Du Quartier station & Brossard station
724	Panama – Terminus Longueuil / Métro Longueuil-Université-de-Sherbrooke	Longueuil–Université-de-Sherbrooke; Panama	Used in case of a service disruption on the REM
725	Brossard – Du Quartier – Terminus Longueuil / Métro Longueuil-Université-de-Sherbrooke	Longueuil–Université-de-Sherbrooke; Du Quartier; Brossard	Used in case of a service disruption on the REM
901	Ligne métropolitaine Taschereau	Longueuil–Université-de-Sherbrooke; Panama; Terminus La Prairie; Terminus Montcalm-Candiac; Terminus Georges-Gagné	ARTM bus line operated by the RTL Daily

== Shared taxi routes ==
The RTL provides 14 shared taxi routes for residents in certain sectors that are not served by regular bus routes. Shared taxis serve the same stops and accept the same tickets and passes as the bus service. Shared taxis take riders to the nearest transfer point. Each shared taxi route has its own schedule.

== Other transit services ==
- School buses: RTL provides more than 70 school bus lines (numbered in the 500s and 600s) to public high schools in the Centre de services scolaire Marie-Victorin and Riverside School Board systems, as well as a few private secondary schools on the territory. These buses only run once in each direction on school days. More than 8000 pupils use the service.
- REM replacement bus service: When the REM trains experience an outage, or during planned maintenance, RTL provides shuttles between Panama, Du Quartier, Brossard stations on its territory, and stations on Nuns' Island and Montreal Central Station. Replacement bus service lines are numbered in the 700s.
- Paratransit: Beyond wheelchair-accessible bus lines, registered users with recognized disabilities living in the area can make appointments for point-to-point paratransit. This service is offered to 5000 users.
- On-demand transit: RTL operates an RTL à la demande app where riders can create an on-demand transit account and schedule a pick-up and drop-off in four sparser areas of the territory.

== See also ==
- Autorité régionale de transport métropolitain
- Exo (public transit)
- List of park and rides in Greater Montreal
