= Terminus De Montarville =

Coordinates: 45°36′03″N 73°27′01″W

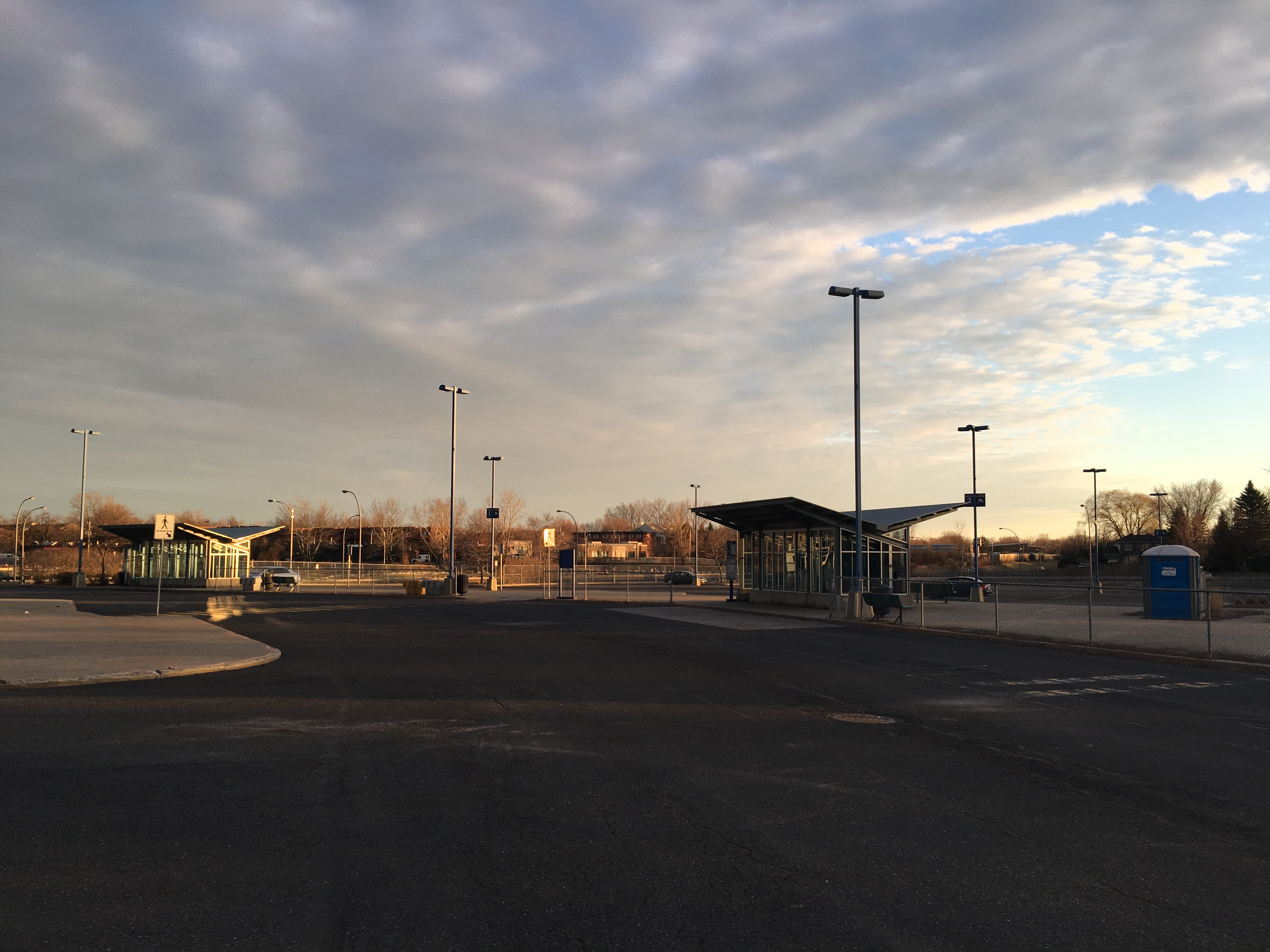

General information
- Owner: ARTM
- Bus operators: Réseau de transport de Longueuil; Exo bus services

Construction
- Parking: Park and ride with 308 spaces
- Cycle facilities: Bicycle rack with 35 spaces

Other information
- Fare zone: ARTM: B

History
- Opened: 2007

Passengers
- 2016: 245,700 (Exo)
Location

The Terminus De Montarville is an ARTM bus terminus in the city of Boucherville.

The bus terminus was built on the corner of Quebec route 132 and Boulevard De Montarville. It includes a 308 car and 35 bicycle capacity parking and seven waiting areas for buses on two bus platforms.

It was built to help transfers between Boucherville's RTL bus lines 61, 80 and 85, and CIT Sorel-Varennes bus lines 700, 720, 721 and 722 on April 7, 2008.

On June 1, 2017, the AMT was dissolved and replaced by two new governing bodies: the Autorité régionale de transport métropolitain (ARTM) and the Réseau de transport métropolitain (RTM). The ARTM then took ownership of the facility.

== Connecting bus routes ==
Réseau de transport de Longueuil
No.	Route	Connects to	Service times / Notes
61	Boucherville / Terminus Radisson	Radisson; De Mortagne park and ride	Daily
80 ♿︎	De Montarville / Carrefour de la Rive-Sud	Longueuil–Université-de-Sherbrooke	Daily
82	Marie-Victorin / du Fort-St-Louis	Longueuil–Université-de-Sherbrooke	Weekdays, peak only
85	Îles-Percées / de Mortagne / de Gascogne	Longueuil–Université-de-Sherbrooke; De Mortagne park and ride	Weekdays, peak only
161	R.-Therrien / J.-Cartier / De Montarville	Longueuil–Université-de-Sherbrooke; De Mortagne park and ride	Daily
180	De Montarville / des Sureaux	Longueuil–Université-de-Sherbrooke	Weekdays only
Exo Sorel-Varennes sector
No.	Route	Connects to	Services times / notes
700	Sorel-Tracy - Longueuil	Longueuil–Université-de-Sherbrooke	Daily
720	Varennes - Longueuil	Longueuil–Université-de-Sherbrooke	Daily
721	Varennes - Longueuil	Longueuil–Université-de-Sherbrooke	Weekdays, peak only
722	Varennes - Longueuil	Longueuil–Université-de-Sherbrooke	Weekdays, peak only

== See also ==
- List of park and rides in Greater Montreal
