= Panama station =

REM station in Brossard, Quebec, Canada

Panama
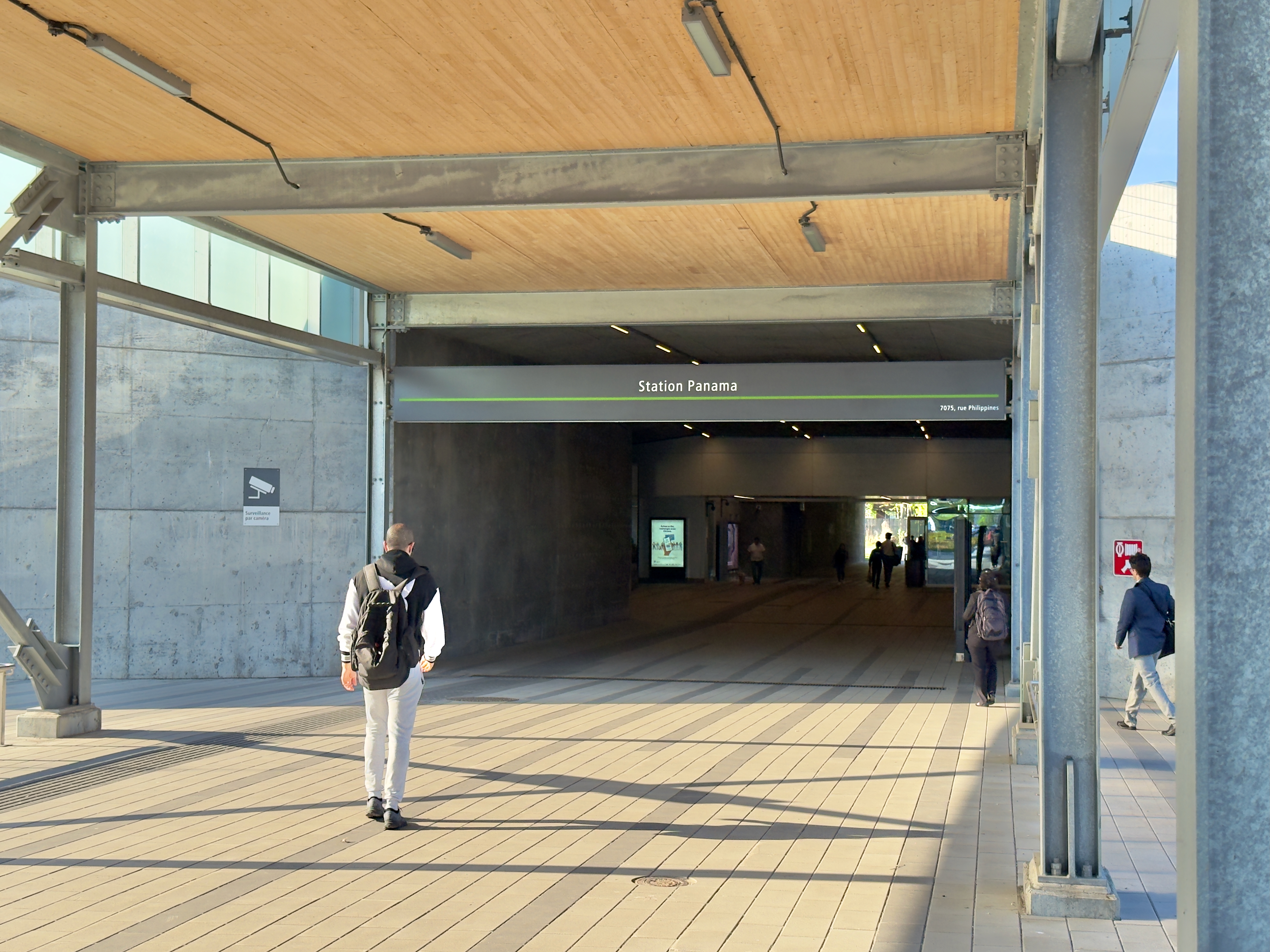
- Philippines Street entrance to station.

General information
- Location: 7075 Philippines Street; Brossard, Quebec; Canada
- Coordinates: 45°28′03″N 73°28′07″W
- Operator: Pulsar (AtkinsRéalis and Alstom)
- Platforms: 1 island platform
- Tracks: 2
- Connections: Réseau de transport de Longueuil; Exo bus services; Saint-Jean-sur-Richelieu public transit

Construction
- Structure type: At-grade
- Parking: 304 spaces
- Cycle facilities: 200 rack spaces
- Accessible: Yes

Other information
- Station code: PAN
- Fare zone: ARTM: B

History
- Opened: 31 July 2023; 3 years ago

Services
Preceding station	REM	Following station
Île-des-Soeurs toward Deux-Montagnes or Anse-à-l'Orme	Réseau express métropolitain	Du Quartier toward Brossard
Future services
Preceding station	REM	Following station
Île-des-Soeurs toward Airport	Réseau express métropolitain (opens 2027)	Du Quartier toward Brossard
Location

Panama station is a Réseau express métropolitain (REM) station in the city of Brossard, Quebec, Canada. It is operated by CDPQ Infra and serves as a station on the South Shore branch of the REM. The station opened on 31 July 2023.

The station replaced the Panama bus terminus and functions as a large transit hub for the cities of Longueuil and Brossard. This station is equipped with a bus terminal as well as a 304-space parking lot.

== History ==
The bus terminus was inaugurated in 1985. The original building was located at the intersection of Panama Street and Taschereau Boulevard. It was adjacent to both Autoroute 10 and Mail Champlain. The new building is located 70 metres (230 ft) south of the old terminal, situating itself closer to the new Panama station. In 2006, a busway (bus lane) was constructed between the terminus and the Taschereau Interchange of Autoroute 10.

Starting in September 2018, the bus terminus was progressively demolished to make way for the Panama station of the Réseau express métropolitain metro network. A temporary bus terminal was implemented in 2020 in order to make way for additional construction. The new bus terminal opened partially on July 11, 2022, with the waiting area and entrance to the REM closed. The new terminal was named Terminus Panama, instead of Terminus Brossard-Panama, to not confuse it with the new Brossard station.

== Artwork ==
A photographic artwork titled Un voyage sans fin au-delà du présent by photographer Chih-Chien Wang is located in the access tunnel to the station. This work was unveiled in October 2024.

== Terminus Panama ==
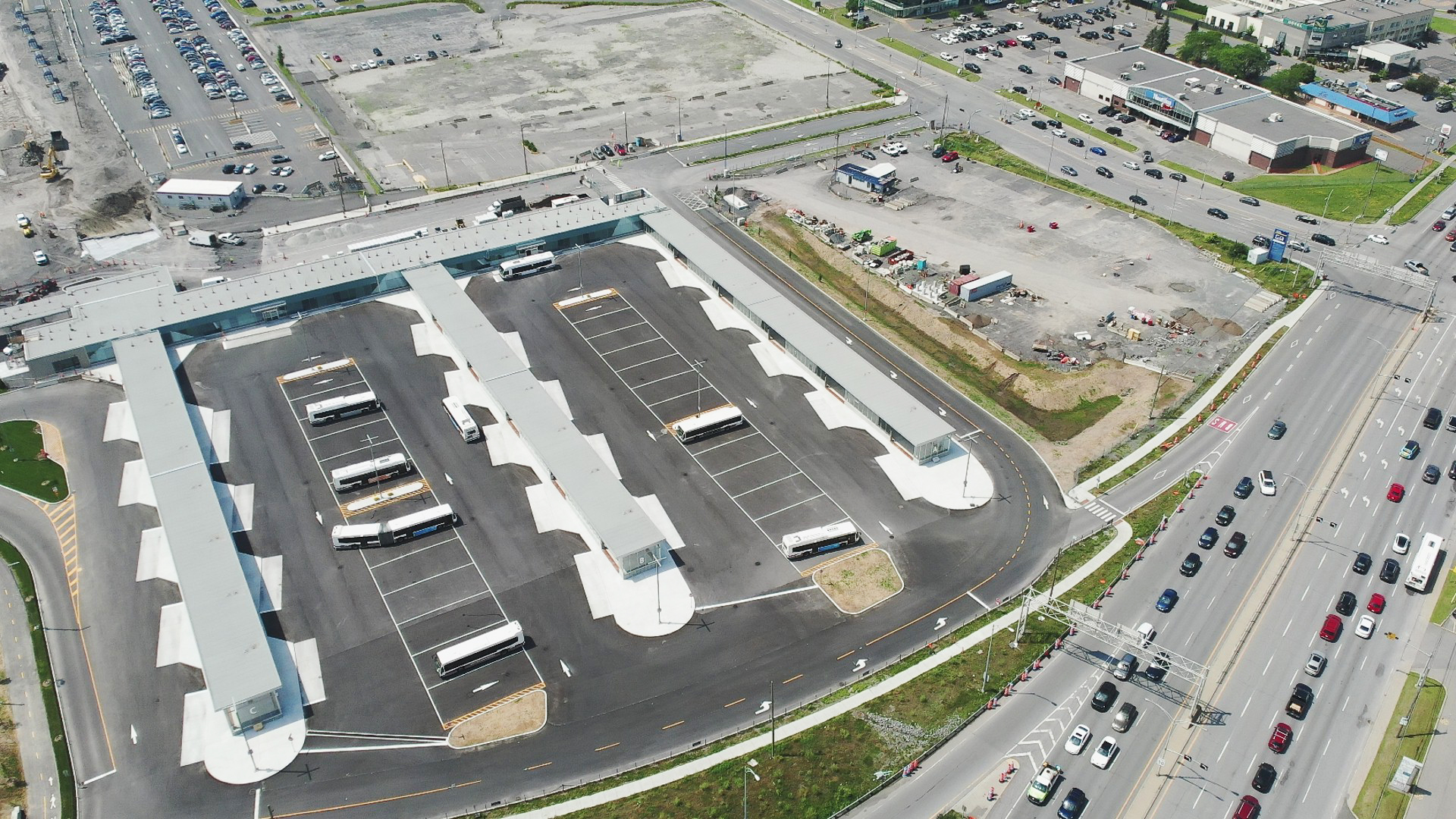
Overhead photo of the new Panama Terminus

Panama station has a bus terminal called Terminus Panama, with 30 platforms. A total of 37 bus lines serve the station.

Réseau de transport de Longueuil
No.	Route	Connects to	Service times / notes	Terminus wing and gate
5	Auteuil / Montée Saint-Hubert / Maisonneuve	Bonaventure; Gare Centrale; Terminus Centre-Ville	Daily	C21
6 ♿︎	Victoria	Longueuil–Université-de-Sherbrooke; Saint-Lambert	Daily	C27
13 ♿︎	Riverside / Secteurs P-V Brossard	Longueuil–Université-de-Sherbrooke	Daily	C26
15 ♿︎	Riverside / Alexandra / Churchill	Longueuil–Université-de-Sherbrooke	Daily	C26
30	Secteurs P-V Brossard		Weekdays, peak only	B17
33	Secteurs M-N-O-R Brossard		Daily	B17
34	Secteur A Brossard / Bellevue		Weekdays, peak only	B16
37	Simard / du Béarn		Weekdays, peak only	B18
38 ♿︎	Chevrier / Secteur B Brossard	Brossard	Daily	B18
42	Gaétan-Boucher / Parc de la Cité		Daily	C20
44	Secteurs M-N-O Brossard		Daily	C24
47 ♿︎	Secteurs R-S-T Brossard		Daily	C28
50	Bienville / Orchard / Prince-Charles		Daily	C23
59	Montgomery / Gareau		Weekdays, peak only	B16
60 ♿︎	Milan / Gaétan-Boucher / Promenades Saint-Bruno		Weekdays only	C20
77 ♿︎	Taschereau / Coteau-Rouge / Cégep É.-Montpetit		Daily	A22 A25
114 ♿︎	Station Brossard / de Rome / St-Laurent	Brossard	Daily	
160 ♿︎	Milan / Gaétan-Boucher / Centre-Ville Saint-Bruno	Seigneurial park and ride	Daily	C20
720	Interstation Rive-Sud	Île-des-Sœurs; Du Quartier; Brossard	Used in case of a service disruption on the REM between Île-des-Soeurs station, Panama station, Du Quartier station & Brossard station	A3 A4
724	Panama – Terminus Longueuil / Métro Longueuil-Université-de-Sherbrooke	Longueuil–Université-de-Sherbrooke	Used in case of a service disruption on the REM	
901	Ligne métropolitaine Taschereau	Longueuil–Université-de-Sherbrooke; Terminus La Prairie; Terminus Montcalm-Candiac; Terminus Georges-Gagné	ARTM bus line operated by the RTL Daily	A2 A7
TA ♿︎	RTL Transport adapté			S31
Exo Richelain / Roussillon sector
No.	Route	Connects to	Service times / notes	Terminus wing and gate
453	La Prairie (Vieux La Prairie) – Terminus Panama		Weekdays, peak only	B10
459	Candiac – Terminus Panama	Terminus Montcalm-Candiac	Weekdays, peak only	B12
553	Sainte-Catherine – Delson – Terminus Panama		Weekdays, peak only	B15
Exo Transport adapté
No.	Route	Connects to	Service times / notes	Terminus wing and gate
TA ♿︎	Exo Transport adapté			S31
Saint-Jean-sur-Richelieu public transit
No.	Route	Connects to	Service times / notes	Terminus wing and gate
96 A	Saint-Jean-sur-Richelieu		Daily	B14
