= Quartier DIX30 =

Coordinates: 45.443031°N 73.43575°W

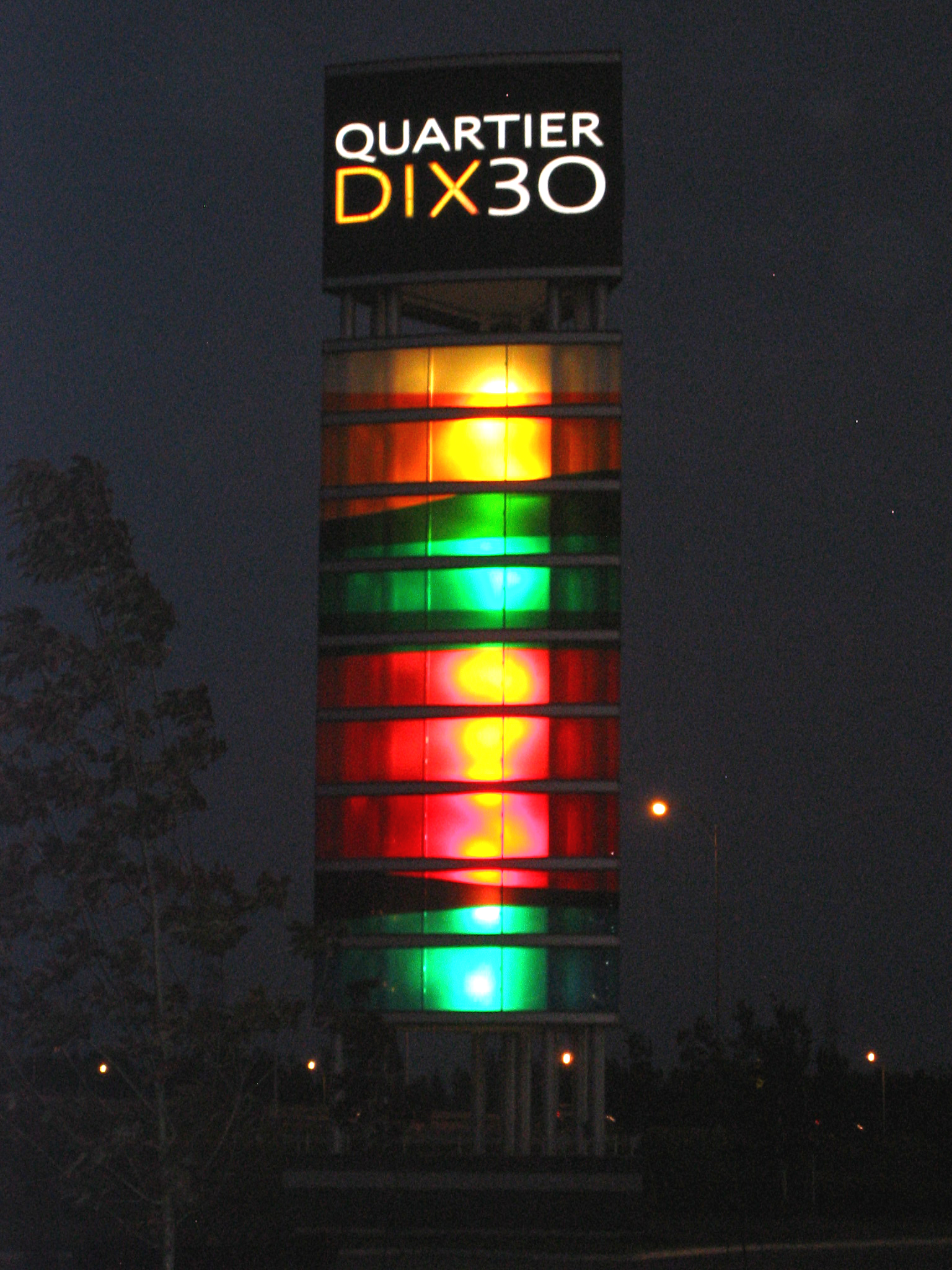
- The Quartier DIX30 tower, illuminated at night.
- Location: Brossard, Quebec, Canada
- Address: 9370 Leduc Boulevard
- Opened: September 14, 2006 (Phase I)
- Developer: Devimco Real Estate Development Firm
- Manager: RioCan Real Estate Investment Trust
- Owner: RioCan Real Estate Investment Trust (50%); Hydro-Québec pension Fund (20%); Fonds de placement immobilier Beaudoin-Bombardier (15%); STM pension fund (9%); Quebec City pension fund (6%)
- Num. of stores: 500 (When fully completed)
- Num. of anchor tenants: +-10
- Parking: Outdoor & underground parking lots
- Public transit: 4 ♿︎ 14 ♿︎ 32 38 ♿︎ 47 ♿︎ 132 192 214 ♿︎ 139 Du Quartier
- Website: quartierdix30.com

Quartier DIX30 (also commonly referred to as Dix 30 in French and Distrande in English) is a commercial lifestyle centre located in Brossard, Quebec. It is considered Canada's first lifestyle centre and occupies an area of 2,746,063 sq ft (255,117.6 m^{2}) in the L section of Brossard. Quartier DIX30 was designed to emulate an urban or downtown shopping experience with boutiques and to meet the needs of suburban dwellers living on the South Shore of Montreal. Its name (meaning "TEN 30 District" in English) refers to its location: at the west corner of the intersection between Autoroute 10 and Autoroute 30.

Quartier DIX30 is served by Réseau de transport de Longueuil buses and the Réseau express métropolitain (REM) light metro station Du Quartier.

== Project ==
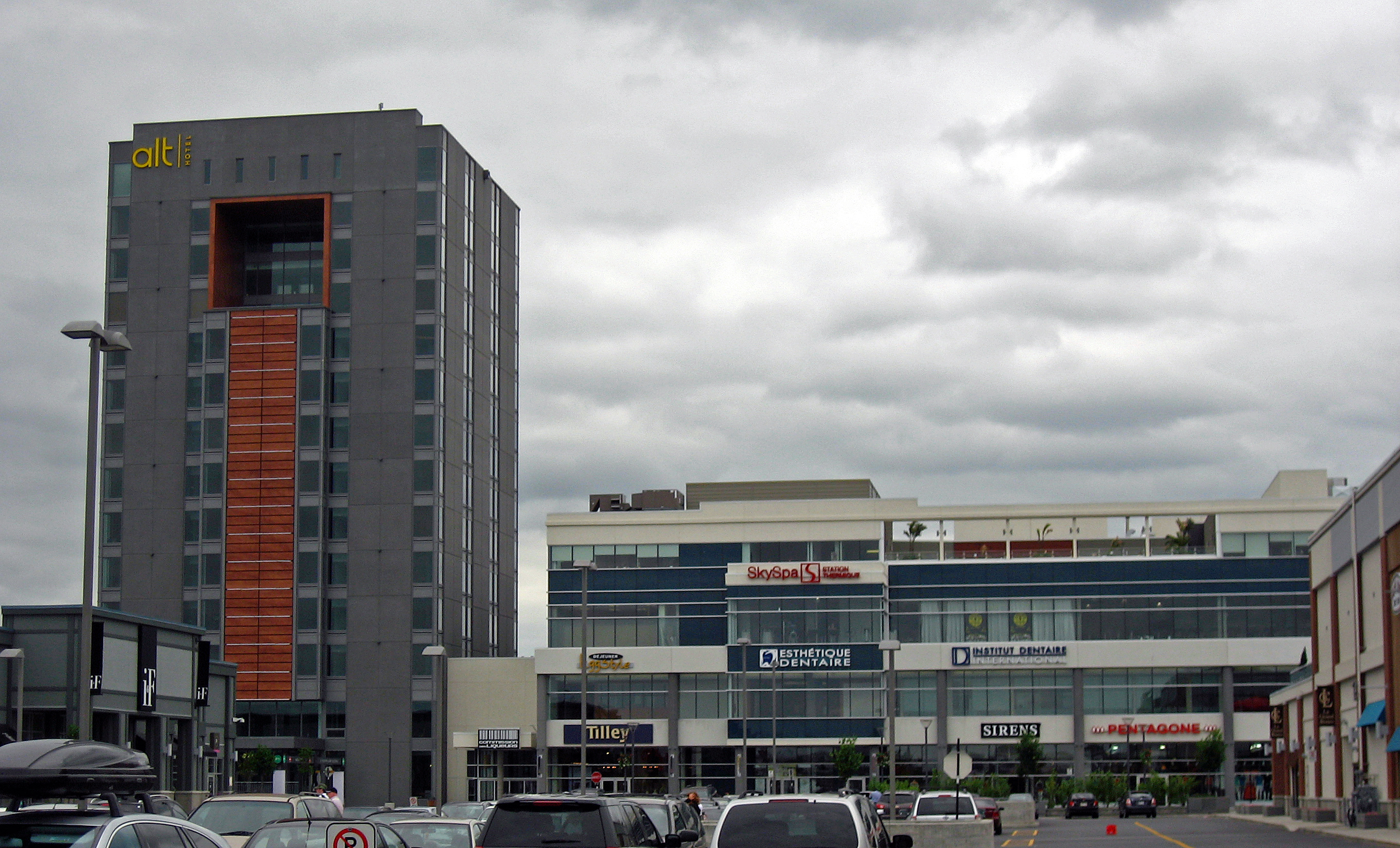
The ALT Hotel at Quartier Dix30.

According to a RioCan press release, "Quartier DIX30 was originally planned in three phases. [...] Phase III goes beyond the initial agreement and comprises approximately 36 acres (15 ha) of adjacent land."

=== Phase I (September 2006) ===
Following a press conference on September 14, 2006, the 150-million Canadian dollar phase I of Quartier DIX30 was opened to the public by the developer (Devimco Real Estate Development Firm|Devimco) and the majority owner (RioCan). This initial phase included the opening of 400,000 square feet (40,000 m^{2}) of retail space and of a total of 78 boutiques and restaurants, among many other national retailers.

=== Phase II (April 2007) ===
Another 40 retailers were opened like major foreign fashion boutiques, electronic stores and restaurant franchises. Furthermore, free underground parking was opened with access ramps along des Lumières Avenue.

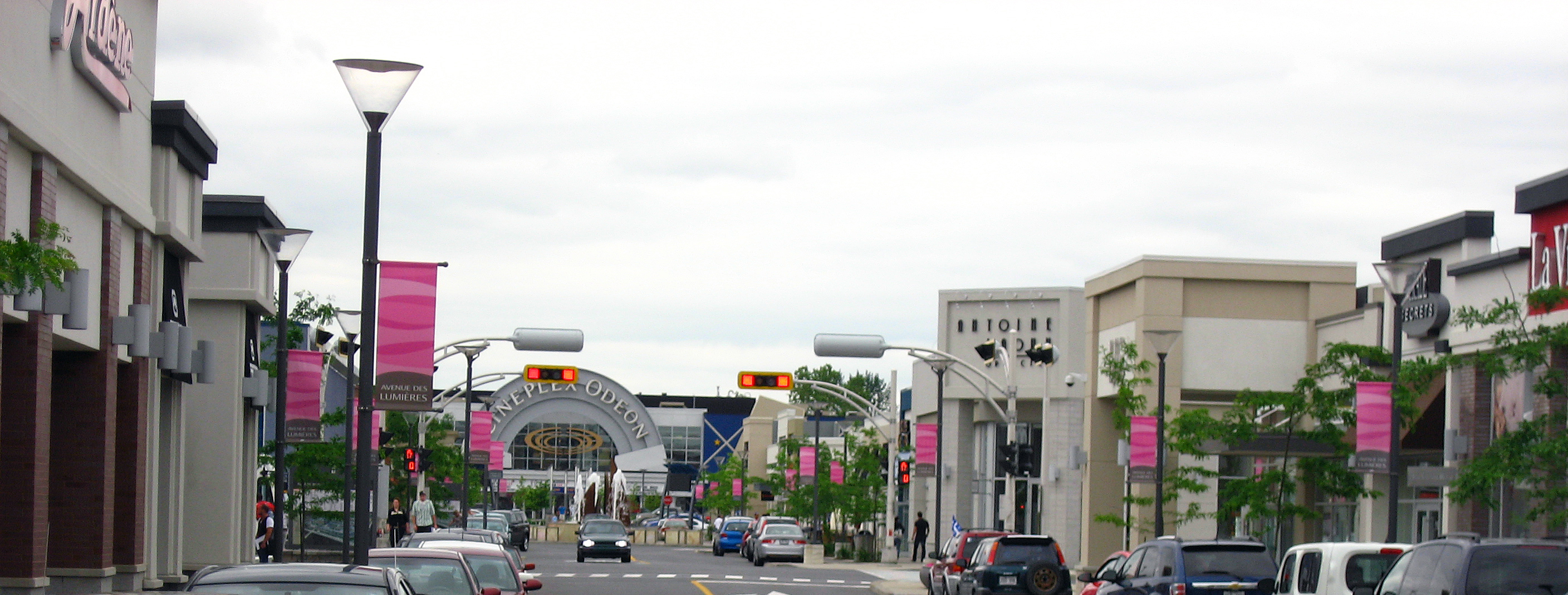
Shops in Quartier Dix30.

=== (Autumn 2007) ===
The Germain Group built a boutique-hotel: ALT Hotel, a cheap-chic concept designed by LEMAYMICHAUD Architecture Design that "offers the qualities sought by a growing range of consumers who want affordable accommodation without compromising on design and comfort." The hotel was built alongside the brand new entertainment complex which includes a 900-seat live theatre and concert hall, spa and gym.

Furthermore, a Bureau en Gros supplies store, a Safari Pet Centre (the largest in Quebec), a Canadian Tire retailer, a RONA hardware and home improvement store and a large Wal-Mart store have been built on lots in the vicinity of the hotel.

=== Phase III (Winter 2009) ===
This new phase will consist of 200 shops and restaurants and is under construction. The new shops will be built in between Bell Sport Complex and Cineplex Odeon, these are the stores confirmed.

=== Summer 2013 ===
Holt Renfrew's new off-price retail store hr2 opened a store in this most recent phase. The arrival coincides with an opening of 100 additional fashion brands (including Lacoste, Michael Kors, Pandora, Peak Performance, Zara, Jack & Jones, Vero Moda, Urban Behavior, Yves Rocher, Apple, Rudsak, Fossil, Birks), several other stores, restaurants as well as banks, a new live theatre, office towers, a hotel, a medical clinic, a toy superstore, as well as a heated underground parking lot that will feature 2,000 free spaces.

== Medical clinic ==
A private medical clinic, possibly associated with the Fonds d'investissement de placement immobilier BB of the Bombardier and Beaudoin families, opened in 2012.

== CN Sports Complex (previously Bell Center) ==
The Montreal Canadiens and the City of Brossard partnered in building the CN Sports Complex, a 30-million Canadian dollar recreational facility that features two NHL-sized rinks with a capacity of 800 seats, as well as dressing rooms, an indoor soccer field (built to FIFA specifications) and a fitness centre. It is open to the general public and was built adjacent to the Quartier DIX30 shopping complex. It primarily serves as the practice facility for the Canadiens, but is also the home of other sports-related groups, such as Foot-Total, a soccer academy. The center is now named Complexe Sportif CN (CN Sports Complex).

== See also ==
- Bell Sports Complex
- List of largest shopping malls in Canada
- List of malls in Montreal
- Mail Champlain
- Place Portobello
