= Autorité régionale de transport métropolitain =

Public transit authority

Agency overview
- Formed: June 1, 2017
- Jurisdiction: Greater Montreal
- Headquarters: 1001 boulevard Robert-Bourassa, Montreal, Quebec, Canada
- Annual budget: CA$2,470.6 million (2023)
- Agency executives: Ginette Sylvain, chairperson; Benoît Gendron, General Manager
- Website: www.artm.quebec

The Autorité régionale de transport métropolitain (ARTM; lit. 'Metropolitan Regional Transportation Authority') is a transportation authority that plans, finances and integrates public transport in Greater Montreal in Quebec, Canada. The organization was created by the Government of Quebec on June 1, 2017, replacing the former planning mandate of the Agence métropolitaine de transport (AMT). It has assumed other key initiatives including Opus card operation and multiple other projects supporting transit.

== History ==
Attempts at planning, coordinating, operating and integrating regional public transit in the Greater Montreal area have been made since 1970, with the mandates from different levels of government, including: Bureau de transport métropolitain (BTM), accountable to the Montreal Urban Community; Bureau d'aménagement du réseau express métropolitain (BAREM, unrelated to the current REM); Conseil des transports de la région de Montréal (COTREM), manated by the Quebec Ministry of Transportation (MTQ), the Conseil métropolitain de transport en commun (CMTC), created by an Act of the National Assembly and; Divisions of the MTQ itself. Following the publishing of the Pichette Report on governance of Greater Montreal, the Quebec government takes steps to create a single agency for governing transit, reporting directly to the minister (and not the ministry) of transport.

In December 1995, the National Assembly enacts a law creating the Agence métropolitain de transport (AMT), giving it the mission "to support, develop, coordinate and promote shared transportation, including special transportation services for the handicapped, to improve suburban train services and ensure their development, to foster the integration of the services provided by various modes of transportation and to increase the efficiency of traffic corridors." It supplants the CMTC and inherits the commuter rail operations from the Société de transport de Montréal. The AMT went on to oversee the Montreal area's transit strategy and operated commuter rail lines, express bus lines and park and ride lots.

In May 2014, Quebec Premier Philippe Couillard announced in his inaugural speech his intention to review the AMT's mandate. In April 2015, Radio-Canada reported that the provincial government intended to replace the AMT with two organizations: one to plan; and one to operate trains, suburban buses and oversee the other transit operators.

On June 1, 2017, Bill 76 was implemented: the AMT was officially dissolved and replaced by two newly created organizations: the ARTM and the Réseau de transport métropolitain (RTM). The AMT's planning mandate went to the ARTM, while the operation of the various commuter rail lines across the Greater Montreal became the responsibility of the RTM (later rebranded Exo).

== Role and relationship in Montreal public transit ==
The ARTM plays a role of "organizing authority" in the governance model for public transit put in place by the Government of Quebec in the Montreal area:

- The Quebec government sets the transit strategic direction
- The Montreal Metropolitan Community directs and sets transit policies
- The ARTM plans, finances, organizes, develops and promotes an integrated transit network
- Transit operators – namely, Exo, Réseau de transport de Longueuil, Réseau express métropolitain, Société de transport de Laval and Société de transport de Montréal – execute, build and maintain transit operations throughout the ARTM area

== Organization ==
The ARTM's board of directors consists of:

- ten independent members
  - the chair and six regular members appointed Government of Quebec
  - three members appointed by the Montreal Metropolitan Community council
- five mayors from the ARTM's jurisdiction

== Fare structure ==
The ARTM is responsible for setting public transit fares in the Greater Montreal area, including fare collection technology and the Opus transit card system. It began work to simplify the fare structure in 2021, with the aim of reducing the number of fare zones and retiring the majority of the 700 different fare types available on the territory.

There are two primary types of fares:

- "Bus" fares are valid on buses anywhere in the territory (zones A, B and C, including between zones. Out-of-territory bus tickets are valid on Exo bus services that operate between zones B, C and D.
- "All Modes" fares are zone-specific (A, AB, ABC or ABCD) but are valid on any mode of transit provided in those zones (bus, commuter train, REM, river shuttle or métro).

You can buy fares valid for:

- 1, 2 or 10 trips. Trips may involve an unlimited number of transfers on valid modes and zones, for up to 90 or 120 minutes.
- Unlimited trips for an evening, weekend, 24 hours, 3 days or a month.

Reduced fares are available for children, students over 18, and people aged 65 and over. Children aged 11 and under ride for free.

The fare schedule includes more specific and less flexible fares for individual public transit operators and Exo bus sectors. Paratransit has its own fare schedule for registered users.

=== Fare zones ===
The ARTM has implemented a fare system with four zones across its territory, named from A (innermost) to D (outermost).

Fare zone A - Agglomeration of Montréal
Fare zone B - Laval and Agglomeration of Longueuil
Fare zone C - Southern and Northern suburbs
Fare zone D - Areas served by exo but outside of ARTM jurisdiction

Prior to July 1, 2021, the ARTM operated 8 zones for train and monthly passes, numbered 1 to 8. Progressively since 2021, fares have been introduced for all modes of transit using combinations of A, AB, ABC and ABCD, and for buses within ABC as well as between C and D.

As of the fare schedule of July 1, 2025, most fares use zones A-D, with the exception of combination bus/REM tickets and bus-specific fares.

=== Fare payment ===
Exo provides passengers a Opus+ subscription which automatically debits the passenger's bank account or credit card and adds the pass to the passenger's Opus card.

== Funding ==
The ARTM is responsible for the structure, sale, collection and validation of transit fares, and a large part of the financing of public transit on its territory.

Sources of financing include:

- taxes on gas and vehicle registration charged on the authority's territory
- the sale of fares, payments from paid parking spaces and from fines
- allocations from the provincial budget, either for public transit operations or for large-scale projects
- royalties collected to finance a new service offer
- contributions made by municipalities in the territory or those outside of the territory served by Exo.

The majority of expenses are service contracts held with public transit authorities and with the REM. In 2025, these costs amounted to 89% of the ARTM's budget. Transit operators are paid according to their fixed costs and the distance their services have travelled. Other expenses include metropolitan-scale infrastructure such as bus terminuses, ticket offices and the fare management system, as well as service planning and operations.

== Uniform signage ==
Network icons in the new Signalétique métropolitaine
Metro network icon

REM network icon

Commuter rail network icon

BRT network icon

Bus network icon

In 2018, the ARTM gave the Société de transport de Montréal the mandate to develop standards for a harmonized metropolitan signage for public transit agencies to use, based on their recent revision to signage of the Montreal Metro. In July 2023, the ARTM unveiled its updated metropolitan transit network map, in time for the inauguration of the first branch of the REM.

== Assets and equipment ==
The ARTM owns certain equipment of a metropolitan or inter-agency nature, and contracts their operation to the agency on whose territory it is. Notably, it owns and manages a few bus terminals:

- Angrignon
- Brossard
- Cartier
- Centre-Ville
- Côte-Vertu
- Fairview–Pointe-Claire
- Gare d'autocars de Montréal
- Henri-Bourassa
- Le Carrefour
- Longueuil
- De Montarville
- Dorval
- Montmorency
- Panama
- Radisson

The ARTM also owns and manages other assets such as:

- Some park and ride lots
- Reserved bus lanes and BRT infrastructure
- Ticket offices
- The Opus card system

The ARTM also offers a metropolitan bus line which is a high-frequency, long-distance line operating across several transit operators' territories:

- 901 Taschereau, operated by the Réseau de transport de Longueuil between Georges-Gagné terminus in Delson and the Longueuil-Université-de-Sherbrooke station via Panama station

== Future projects ==
The ARTM is undertaking several major projects:

- Metro extensions: Extending the Blue Line by five stations to Anjou. The extension is slated to open in 2031.
- Extending the Pie-IX BRT system to Notre-Dame Street. The extension is due to open in 2027.
- Study a major transit solution to replace the cancelled REM de l'Est project, named PSE. In January 2023, it was revealed that the ARTM was planning on proposing a 21-kilometre light rail line consisting of 22 stations, at a cost of $10.4 billion.
