= Longueuil–Université-de-Sherbrooke station =

Montreal Metro station

Longueuil–Université-de-Sherbrooke
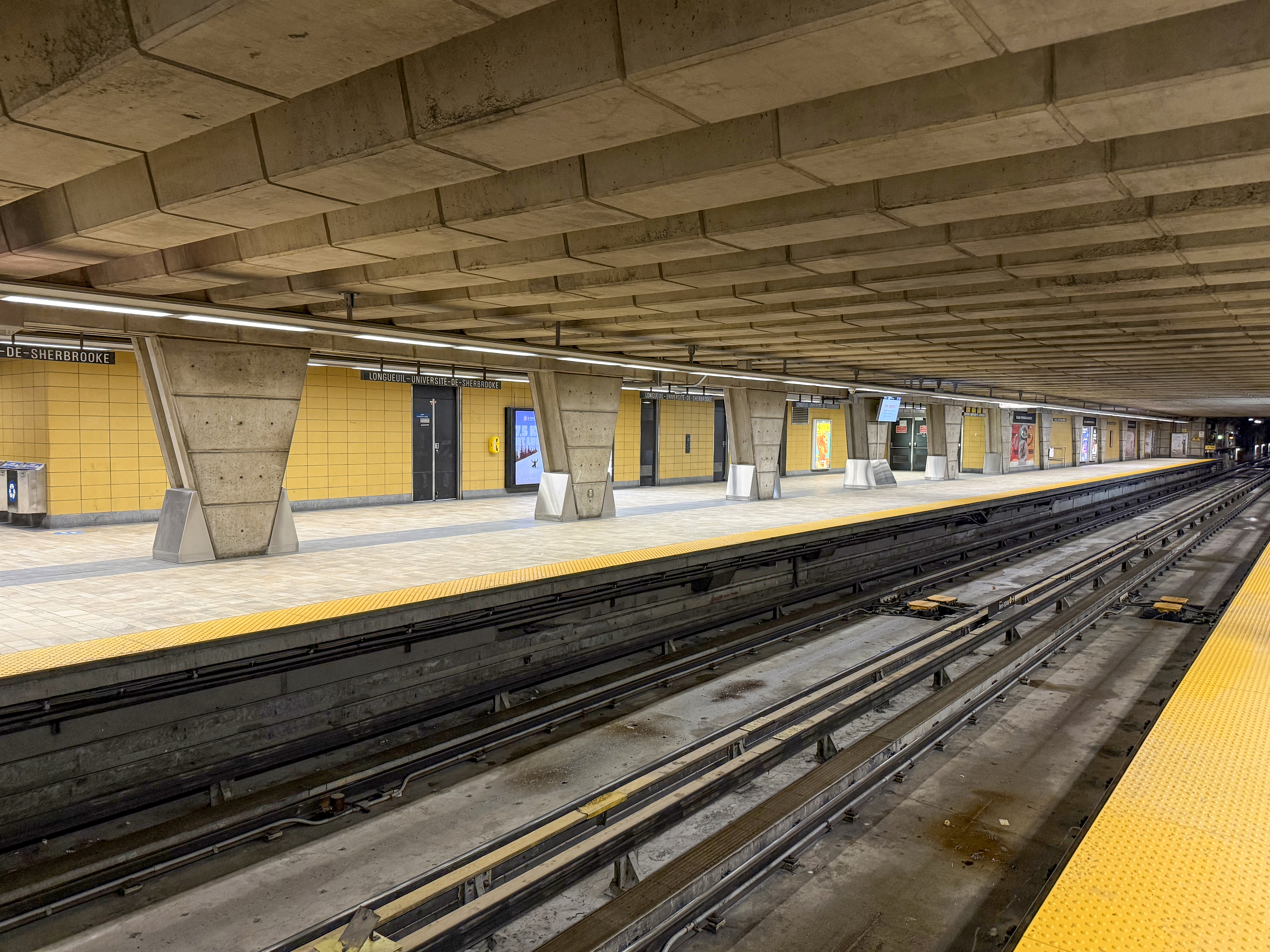
- The station in 2026

General information
- Location: 100, Place Charles Lemoyne; Longueuil, Quebec J4K 2T4; Canada
- Coordinates: 45°31′31″N 73°31′19″W
- Operator: Société de transport de Montréal
- Platforms: 2 side platforms
- Tracks: 2
- Connections: Terminus Longueuil

Construction
- Depth: 4.3 metres (14 feet 1 inch), shallowest, tie with Angrignon
- Accessible: No
- Architect: Jean Dumontier

Other information
- Fare zone: ARTM: B

History
- Opened: 1 April 1967

Passengers
- 2024: 6,349,711 ▲9.64%
- Rank: 10 of 68

Services
| Preceding station | Montreal Metro | Following station |
|---|---|---|
| Jean-Drapeau toward Berri–UQAM | Yellow Line | Terminus |
Location

Longueuil–Université-de-Sherbrooke station is a Montreal Metro station in Longueuil, Quebec, Canada. It is operated by the Société de transport de Montréal (STM) and is the southern terminus of the Yellow Line. It is connected to a campus of Université de Sherbrooke, as well as the largest bus station in Greater Montreal, Terminus Longueuil.

It is one of the busiest stations on the Metro network, with 40% of public transit users from the South Shore using the Yellow Line in the morning peak.

== Overview ==
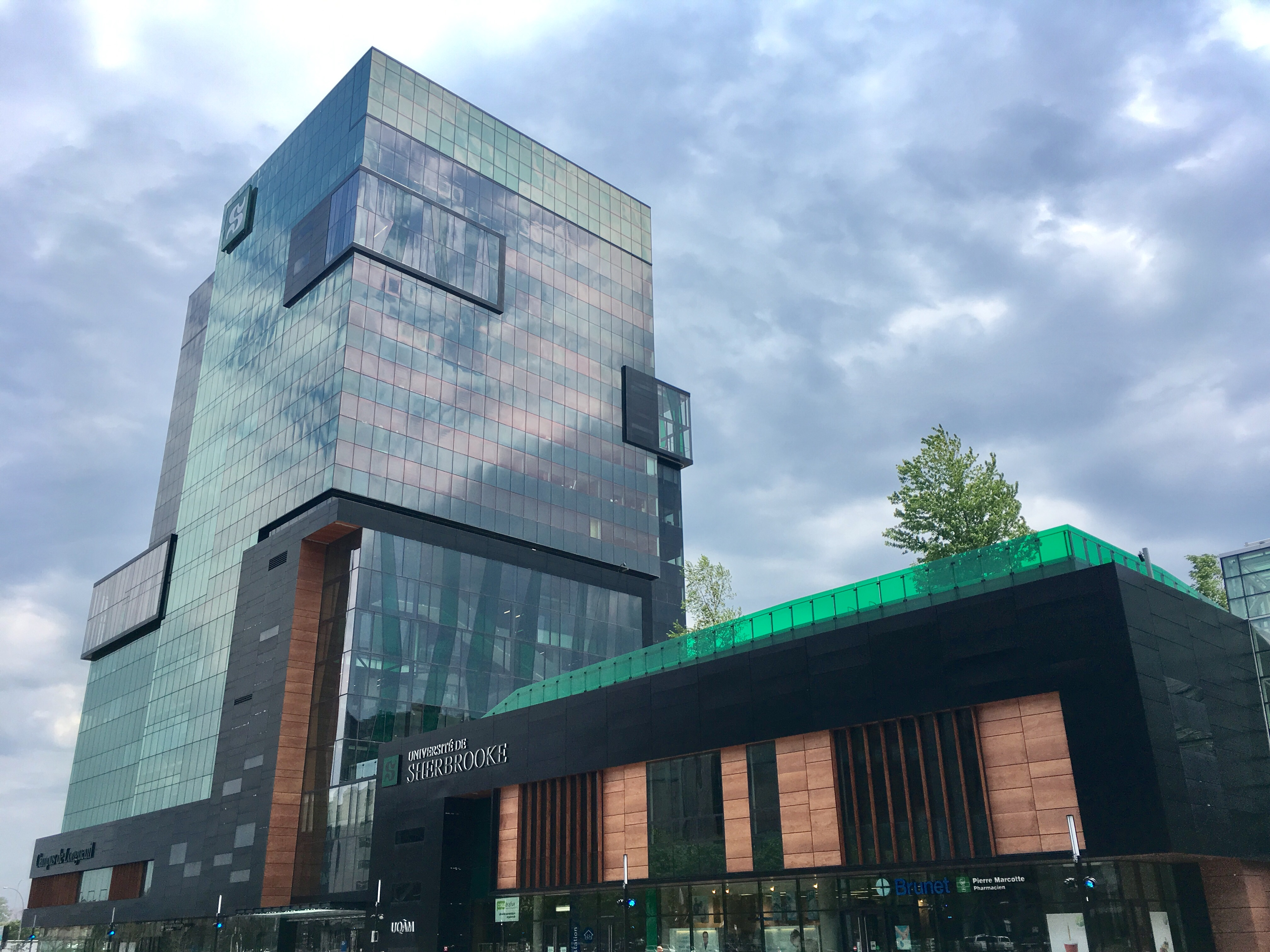
Université de Sherbrooke Longueuil campus, directly connected to the Metro

The Yellow Line was not part of the original plans of Montreal's Metro network, with the line proposed and approved in 1963 to serve the Expo 67 site and connect to the growing South Shore. The suburb of Longueuil contributed $3.3 million towards the construction of the line. The station opened in April 1967 along with the rest of the Yellow Line.

It is a normal side platform station, with a ticket hall installed directly at platform level on the departure platform. As a result, a new fare must be purchased to switch platforms. Longueuil–Université-de-Sherbrooke is directly connected to Terminus Longueuil bus station, and is also connected to several neighbouring buildings through skywalks. This station has underground city access to the Université de Sherbrooke, Université de Montréal and Université Laval’s campuses, as well shopping, office and retail complexes.

The 1967 station building was a single storey building, connected directly to the bus terminal. A large commercial building was subsequently built above the station, with a second floor added in 1972 and an overhead walkway to neighbouring building Port-de-Mer added in 1973.

In 2010, the new campus for Université de Sherbrooke Longueuil was opened to the east of the station, with direct underground city access to the station. In the 2020s, the building above the station was demolished, to be replaced by a 30 storey mixed-use development above the station including residential condominiums, offices and a hotel. This is part of an effort by Longueuil City Council to develop the area around the Metro station, resulting in 8,500 new homes.

In 2022, the STM's Universal Accessibility Report noted that preliminary design work to make the station accessible was underway. STM plan to work with developers to allow the construction of elevators. Local campaigners have pushed to make the station accessible, noting high ridership levels and connections across the South Shore.

== Origin of name ==
When the Yellow Line was being constructed, the station was known as Rive-Sud. The station opened as Longueuil, after the city where it is located. It was renamed Longueuil–Université-de-Sherbrooke on September 26, 2003, to reflect the fact that the Université de Sherbrooke has a campus nearby. (Each Montreal-area university has its name in the nearest Metro station.) Nevertheless, most Montrealers still use the station's original name when referring to this station.

== Connections ==
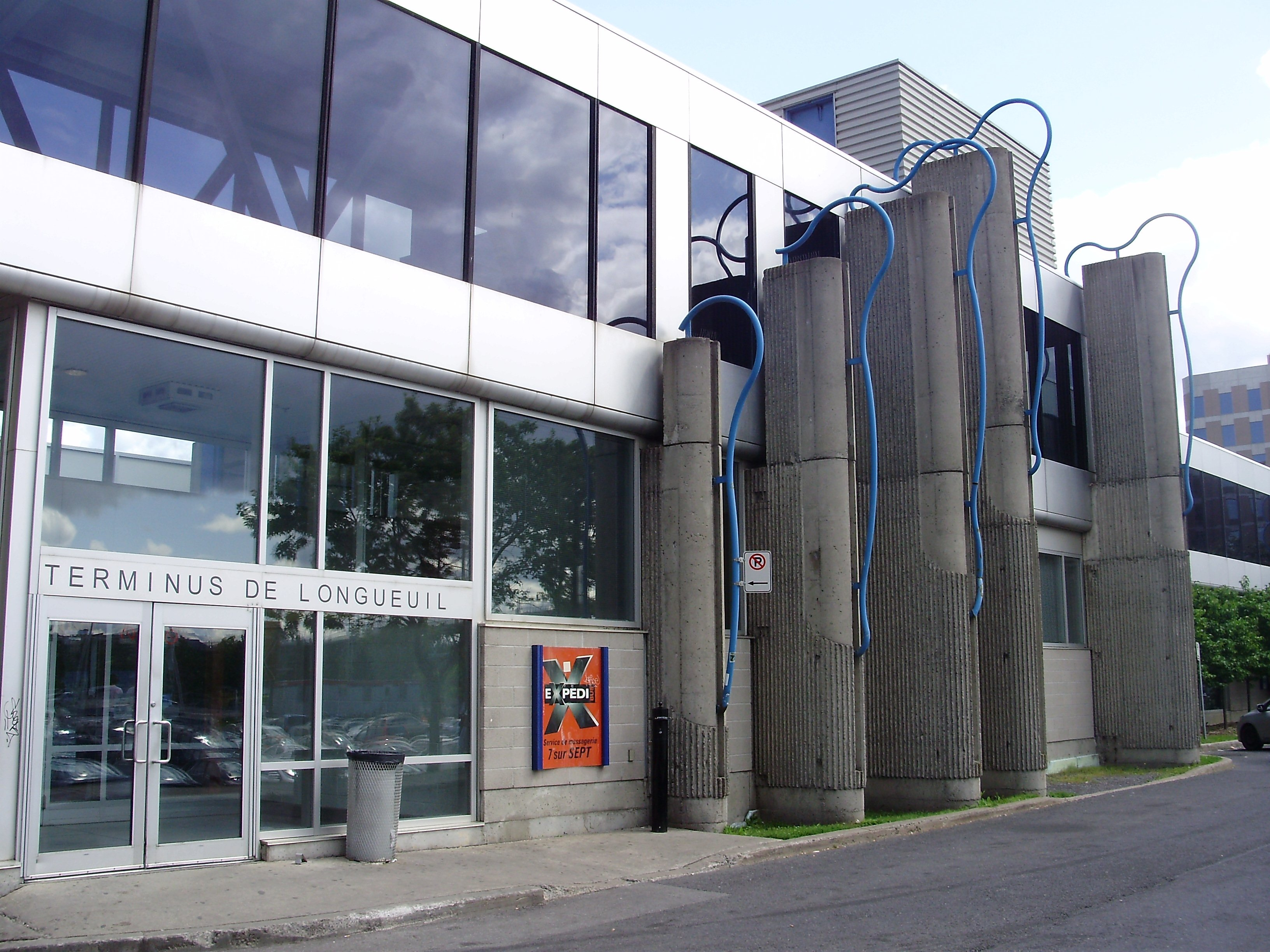
Terminus Longueuil is directly connected to Longueuil–Université-de-Sherbrooke station.

The station is connected to Terminus Longueuil, the largest bus station in Greater Montreal. The bus station has 42 platforms, with bus routes from Longueuil, adjacent municipalities and across Quebec.

Nearly 2,000 parking spaces are available at the station.

== Nearby main intersections ==
The station is located at the junction of two major roads ( Route 132 and Route 134) and one freeway ( Autoroute 20), near the Jacques Cartier Bridge.

== Nearby points of interest ==
- Université de Sherbrooke, Longueuil campus
- Champlain College Saint-Lambert
- Place Longueuil

== See also ==
- Université de Sherbrooke
