= List of park and rides in Greater Montreal =

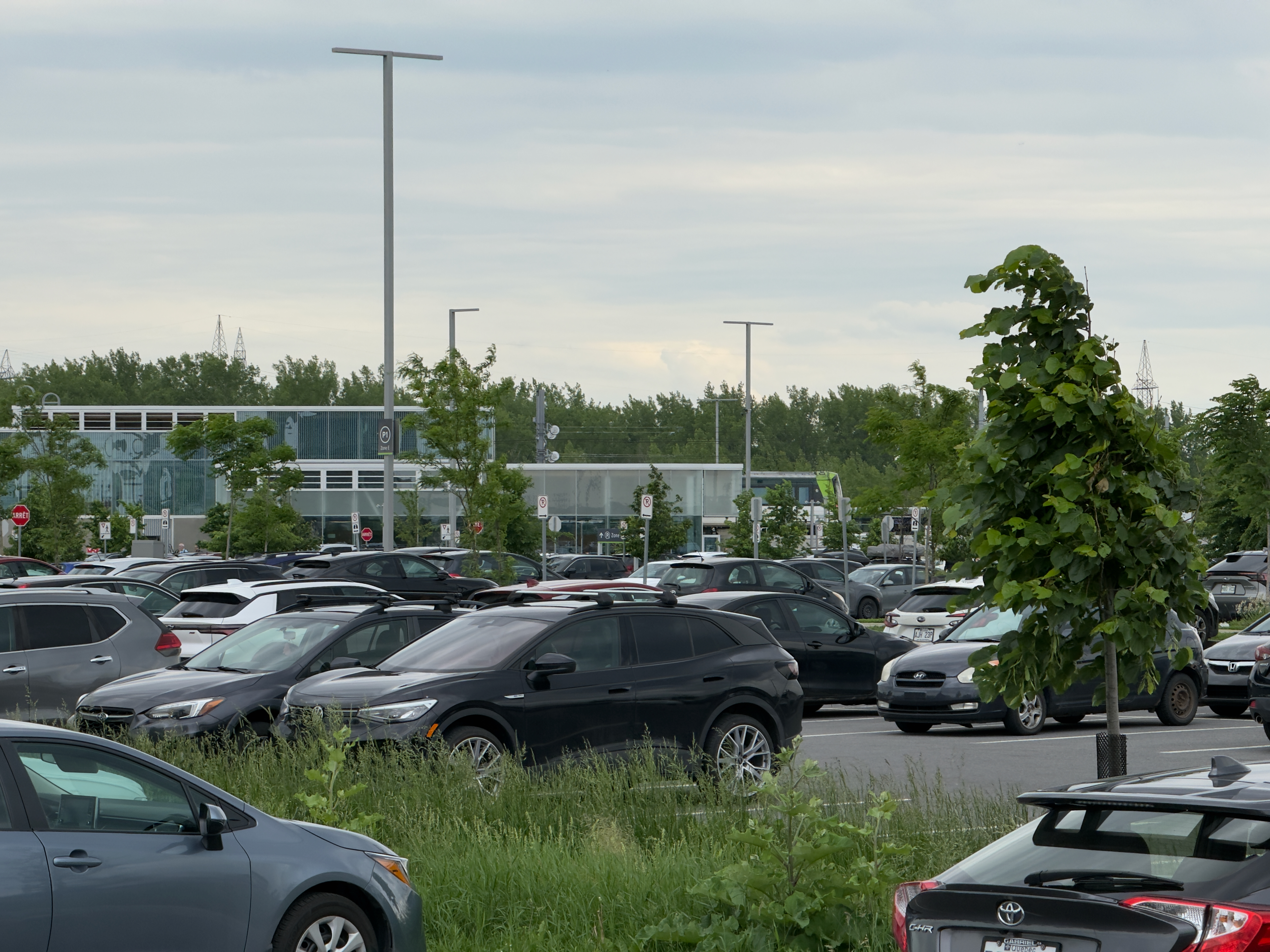
Park and ride at Brossard station

Greater Montreal has a number of park and ride lots (French: stationnements incitatifs), most of which are adjacent to transit hubs such as stations on the Montreal Metro, Exo commuter rail lines, the Réseau express métropolitain (REM), as well as at bus terminals.

ARTM symbol for park and rides

Prior to the reorganization of the governance over public transit in Greater Montreal the Agence métropolitain de transport (AMT) was responsible for all park and ride lots. It operated 61 lots. Since then, the new Autorité régionale de transport métropolitain (ARTM) has retained ownership of certain park and rides but has

The following is a list of park and ride lots in Montreal and its surrounding area, owned and operated by the various local transit agencies.

Park and ride lots
Name	Municipality	Parking spaces	Operator	Transit services	Services
Angrignon	Montreal	733	STM	Green Line; STM buses; Exo bus services	
Anjou	Montreal	308	Exo	Line 15 – Mascouche; STM buses	
Anse-à-l'Orme	Sainte-Anne-de-Bellevue	144 free; 56 paid	Indigo	Réseau express métropolitain; Exo bus services; STM buses	
Baie-D'Urfé	Baie-D'Urfé	72	Exo	Line 11 – Vaudreuil–Hudson; STM buses	
Beaconsfield	Beaconsfield	452	Exo	Line 11 – Vaudreuil–Hudson; STM buses	
Beaurepaire	Beaconsfield	41	Exo	Line 11 – Vaudreuil–Hudson; STM buses	
Beloeil Park and Ride	Beloeil	194	Exo	Exo bus services	
Blainville	Blainville	576	Exo	Line 12 – Saint-Jérôme; Exo bus services	
Bois-Franc	Montreal	635 free; 39 paid	Indigo	Réseau express métropolitain; Société de transport de Laval; STM buses	
Brossard	Brossard	2511 free; 332 paid	Indigo	Réseau express métropolitain; Réseau de transport de Longueuil; Exo bus services	Ticket office
Candiac	Candiac	343	Exo	Line 14 – Candiac; Exo bus services	
Cartier	Montreal	733	STL	Orange Line; Société de transport de Laval	Ticket office
Cedar Park	Pointe-Claire	28	Exo	Line 11 – Vaudreuil–Hudson; STM buses	
Terminus Chambly	Chambly	596	Exo	Exo bus services	
Terminus Châteauguay	Châteauguay	601	Exo	Exo bus services	
Terminus Contrecoeur	Contrecoeur	60	Exo	Exo bus services	
Delson	Delson	106	Exo	Line 14 – Candiac; Exo bus services	
De la Concorde	Laval	102	Exo	Orange Line; Line 12 – Saint-Jérôme; Société de transport de Laval	
Terminus De Montarville	Boucherville	307	RTL	Réseau de transport de Longueuil; Exo bus services	
De Mortagne Park and Ride	Boucherville	437	RTL	Réseau de transport de Longueuil	
De Touraine Park and Ride	Boucherville	291	RTL	Réseau de transport de Longueuil	
Des Sources	Pointe-Claire	285 free; 147 paid	Indigo	Réseau express métropolitain; STM buses	
Deux-Montagnes	Deux-Montagnes	666 free; 301 paid	Indigo	Réseau express métropolitain; Exo bus services	
Dorion	Vaudreuil-Dorion	103	Exo	Line 11 – Vaudreuil–Hudson; Exo bus services	
Dorval	Dorval	372	Exo	Line 11 – Vaudreuil–Hudson; STM buses; Via Rail	
Du Canal	Montreal	150	Exo	Line 14 – Candiac; STM buses	
Du Ruisseau	Montreal	757 free; 297 paid	Indigo	Réseau express métropolitain; Société de transport de Laval; STM buses	
Fairview–Pointe-Claire	Pointe-Claire	300 (Note: An agreement betwen the REM and the owners of Fairview Pointe-Claire in October 2026 made a number of the mall's parking spaces available for overflow. An exact number has not been given.)	Indigo	Réseau express métropolitain; Exo bus services	
Terminus Georges-Gagné	Delson	401	Exo	Exo bus services	
Grand-Moulin	Deux-Montagnes	206 free; 22 paid	Indigo	Réseau express métropolitain; Exo bus services	
Hudson	Hudson	47	Exo	Line 11 – Vaudreuil–Hudson	
Île-Bigras	Laval	35 free; 11 paid	Indigo	Réseau express métropolitain	
Île-Perrot	Île-Perrot	271	Exo	Line 11 – Vaudreuil–Hudson; Exo bus services	
Jules-Phaneuf Park and Ride	Varennes	128	Exo	Exo bus services	
Kirkland	Kirkland	200 paid, residents only	Stat Parkgo	Réseau express métropolitain; STM buses	
Terminus La Prairie	La Prairie	694	Exo	Exo bus services	
Terminus Le Carrefour	Laval	226	STL	Société de transport de Laval; Exo bus services	
Longueuil–Saint-Hubert	Longueuil	23	Exo	Line 13 – Mont-Saint-Hilaire; Réseau de transport de Longueuil	
Longueuil–Université-de-Sherbrooke	Montreal	1880	RTL	Yellow Line; Réseau de transport de Longueuil; Exo bus services	Ticket office
Mascouche	Mascouche	677	Exo	Line 15 – Mascouche; Exo bus services	
McMasterville	McMasterville	723	Exo	Line 13 – Mont-Saint-Hilaire; Exo bus services	
Mirabel	Mirabel	333	Exo	Line 12 – Saint-Jérôme; Exo bus services	
Mirabel Carpool Stop	Mirabel	118	Exo	Carpooling	
Mont-Saint-Hilaire	Mont-Saint-Hilaire	837	Exo	Line 13 – Mont-Saint-Hilaire; Exo bus services	
Terminus Montcalm-Candiac	Candiac	244	Exo	Exo bus services	
Montmorency	Laval	1217	STL	Orange Line; Société de transport de Laval; Exo bus services	Ticket office
Montréal-Ouest	Montréal-Ouest	12	Exo	STM buses	
Namur	Montreal	428	STM	Orange Line; STM buses	
Panama	Brossard	304: 360 free; 75 paid	Indigo	Réseau express métropolitain; Réseau de transport de Longueuil; Exo bus services	Ticket office
Pincourt–Terrasse-Vaudreuil	Pincourt	227	Exo	Line 11 – Vaudreuil–Hudson; Exo bus services	
Pointe-aux-Trembles	Montreal	316	Exo	Line 15 – Mascouche; STM buses	
Pointe-Claire	Pointe-Claire	587	Exo	Line 11 – Vaudreuil–Hudson; STM buses	
Radisson	Montreal	534	STM	Orange Line; STM buses; Exo bus services	Ticket office
Repentigny	Repentigny	586	Exo	Line 15 – Mascouche; Exo bus services	
Terminus Repentigny	Repentigny	291	Exo	Exo bus services	
Rosemère	Rosemère	355	Exo	Line 12 – Saint-Jérôme; Exo bus services	
Pierrefonds-Roxboro	Montreal	823 free; 59 paid	Indigo	Réseau express métropolitain; STM buses	
Rivière-des-Prairies	Montreal	202	Exo	Line 15 – Mascouche; STM buses	
Sainte-Anne-de-Bellevue	Sainte-Anne-de-Bellevue	287	Exo	Line 11 – Vaudreuil–Hudson; STM buses	
Saint-Basile-le-Grand	Saint-Basile-le-Grand	444	Exo	Line 13 – Mont-Saint-Hilaire; Exo bus services	
Saint-Bruno	Saint-Bruno-de-Montarville	567	Exo	Line 13 – Mont-Saint-Hilaire; Réseau de transport de Longueuil	
Sainte-Catherine	Sainte-Catherine	824	Exo	Line 14 – Candiac; Exo bus services	
Saint-Constant	Saint-Constant	350	Exo	Line 14 – Candiac; Exo bus services	
Sainte-Dorothée	Laval	671 free; 165 paid	Indigo	Réseau express métropolitain; Société de transport de Laval; Exo bus services	
Terminus Saint-Eustache	Saint-Eustache	20	Exo	Exo bus services	
Saint-Jérôme	Saint-Jérôme	775	Exo	Line 12 – Saint-Jérôme; Exo bus services	
Terminus Sainte-Julie	Sainte-Julie	953	Exo	Exo bus services	
Saint-Lambert	Saint-Lambert	367	Exo	Line 13 – Mont-Saint-Hilaire; Réseau de transport de Longueuil	
Saint-Léonard–Montréal-Nord	Montreal	179	Exo	Line 15 – Mascouche; STM buses	
Saint-Martin	Laval		STL	Société de transport de Laval; Exo bus services	
Saint-Michel–Montréal-Nord	Montreal		Exo	Line 15 – Mascouche; STM buses; Exo bus services	
Sainte-Rose	Laval	713	Exo	Line 12 – Saint-Jérôme; Société de transport de Laval	
Sainte-Thérèse	Sainte-Thérèse		Exo	Line 12 – Saint-Jérôme; Exo bus services	Ticket office
Seigneurial Park and Ride	Saint-Bruno-de-Montarville	125 spaces	RTL	Réseau de transport de Longueuil	
Sherbrooke Est Park and Ride	Montreal	250 spaces	STM	STM buses; Exo bus services	
Terminus Sorel	Sorel	355	Exo	Exo bus services	
Sunnybrooke	Montreal	453 free; 33 paid	Indigo	Réseau express métropolitain; STM buses	
Terrebonne	Terrebonne	723	Exo	Line 15 – Mascouche; Exo bus services	
Terminus Terrebonne	Terrebonne	850	Exo	Exo bus services	
Valois	Pointe-Claire	145	Exo	Line 11 – Vaudreuil–Hudson; STM buses	
Vaudreuil	Vaudreuil-Dorion	826	Exo	Line 11 – Vaudreuil–Hudson; Exo bus services	
Verchères Park and Ride	Verchères	63	Exo	Exo bus services	
Vimont	Laval	323	Exo	Line 12 – Saint-Jérôme; Société de transport de Laval	

== Former park and rides ==
Former park and ride lots
Name	Municipality	Parking spaces	Operator	Closed	Notes
Chevrier Park and Ride	Brossard	2000	RTL	May 2024 (Note: Since its closure, the parking lot at Chevrier has been used at times for special events, such as during the 2026 UCI Road World Championships.)	Opened September 1998 as Brossard-Chevrier with 600 spaces Expanded to 2000 spaces in 2000; Reduced to 435 in July 2023; Closed with the opening of the Deux-Montagnes branch of the REM
Des Bois Park and Ride	Laval		STL	November 2025	Closed with the opening of the Deux-Montagnes branch of the REM

== Carpooling ==
The ARTM also offers 433 spaces specially reserved for carpooling in its park and ride lots. In operation since 2005, the ARTM Carpool program helps to relieve the demand for parking by reserving seats for customers who carpool in the majority of the park and ride lots.

In addition to the reserved carpool spaces, many park and ride lots also include a number of specific drop-off spaces, nearest to the point of transfer to other modes of transportation (bus, metro, train.)
