= Centre Laval =

- Coordinates: 45.5624°N 73.7315°W
- Address: 1600 Le Corbusier Blvd., Laval, Quebec, Canada; H7S 1Y9
- Opened: March 26, 1968
- Manager: Cominar
- Owner: Cominar
- Num. of stores: 130+
- Num. of anchor tenants: 7
- Floor area: 699,685 sq ft (65,002.9 m^{2}) (GLA)
- Floors: 1
- Public transit: Montmorency; Terminus Montmorency; Société de transport de Laval
- Website: centrelaval.com/en

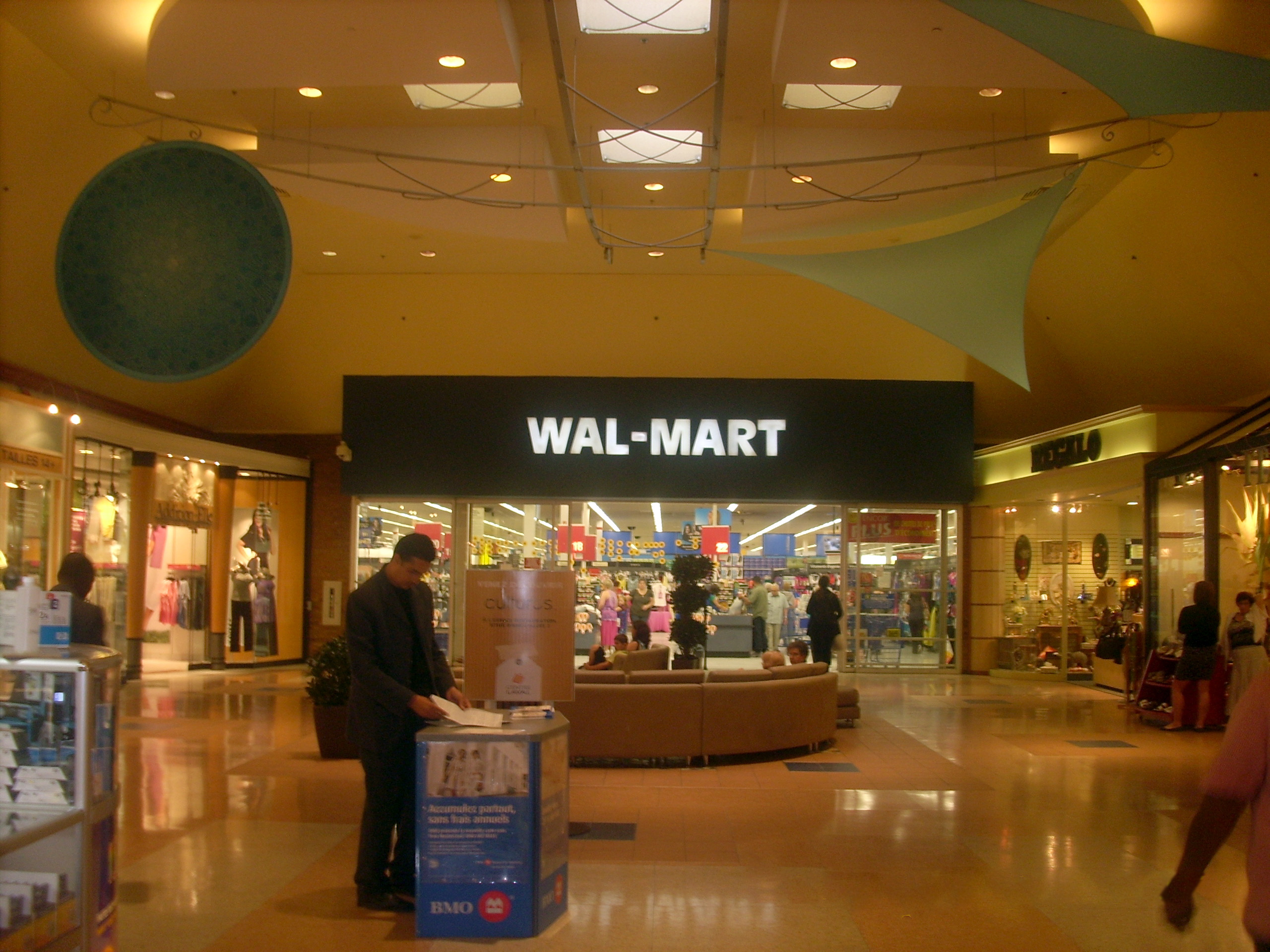
Former Walmart store

Centre Laval is a shopping mall located in the Chomedey district of Laval, Quebec, Canada, at the corner of Saint-Martin West and Le Corbusier boulevard. It is a 10-minute walk from the Montmorency metro station in nearby Laval-des-Rapides. Centre Laval is paired with Quartier Laval, a power centre across the street owned by the same company, with which it makes a shopping complex called DUO.

Though located only 2.5 km (1.6 mi) away from the bigger and more popular Carrefour Laval, Centre Laval is a large shopping mall in its own right with nearly 700,000 square feet (65,000 m^{2}) of retail space. It has 130 shops, services and department stores, including anchors Marshalls/HomeSense, The Brick, Best Buy, Bureau en Gros, Lee Valley, Avril Supermarché Santé and Décathlon. Other tenants of importance include Mark's and Ares. There is also a branch of the Bank of Montreal.

== History ==
Centre Laval began in 1968 as a 370,000 sq ft (34,000 m^{2}) indoor shopping mall with 50 stores anchored by Famous Players theatre, Woolco and Steinberg's. It was notably the first shopping centre with a SAQ store.

Centre Laval literally doubled its size on August 17, 1972, by expanding to the south for a new total of over 100 merchants. Three new mall wings were added and the old area of the shopping centre was renovated. The expansion was supposed to be anchored by Morgan. But by the time the expansion was completed, the Morgan chain had already been renamed to The Bay and the store at Centre Laval inaugurated under the new banner. Montreal Expos baseball players Ken Singleton and Terry Humphrey were present at Centre Laval on August 17 to sign autographs.

In January 1994, it was announced that Walmart would buy the Woolco retail chain to establish a Canadian presence under its own name.

Bureau en Gros acquired the lease of the bankrupt office supply chain Club Biz and inaugurated its Centre Laval store on June 1, 1996. Club Biz, which was founded in 1991 by executives of Steinberg's, had taken over in 1993 the space at Centre Laval of the defunct supermarket following the latter's closing in 1992.

Walmart left Centre Laval in November 2012 to relocate as a Walmart Supercentre on the site formerly occupied by Centre 2000. Walmart's location at Centre Laval was demolished to allow a Target store on its location that operated from 2013 to 2015. The store closed when Target took the decision to withdraw all its Canadian operations. As of October 2017, part of that space was occupied by a 70,000 sq ft (6,500 m^{2}) Sportium sport equipment store. In 2018 more space is being occupied by a 32,000 sq ft (3,000 m^{2}) Avril Supermarché Santé supermarket, and Marshalls and HomeSense.

Lee Valley opened its first store in the province on October 3, 2018.

In June 2020, it was announced that Sportium would close like all locations from that retail banner. Décathlon opened on December 19, 2020.

The second floor of Hudson's Bay was closed around 2020 or 2021 and all of its merchandise was moved on the first level. It was one of four locations tested by Hudson's Bay as part of a pilot project where the stores are used as showrooms so that "customers can easily place online orders for products not available in-store". Hudson's Bay closed in 2025.

== Ownership ==
In April 2007, Homburg Invest Inc acquired Alexis Nihon REIT and thereby officially took ownership of the shopping centre. Centre Laval was transferred to Homburg Canada REIT in 2009 which eventually changed to Canmarc Real Estate Investment Trust in September 2011.

Since March 2012, Centre Laval is owned and managed by Cominar following its acquisition of Canmarc.

== See also ==
- Laval, Quebec
- List of largest enclosed shopping malls in Canada
- List of shopping malls in Canada
