= Opus card =

Public transit smart card in Quebec, Canada

- Location: Quebec, Canada
- Launched: 2008–2009
- Validity: Exo; Réseau express métropolitain; Société de transport de Montréal; Société de transport de Laval; Réseau de transport de Longueuil; Réseau de transport de la Capitale; Société de transport de Lévis; Transport MRC de Joliette
- Website: carteopus.info

Opus (stylized as OPUS) is a rechargeable, dual interface (contact/contactless) smart card automated fare collection system using the Calypso Standard and is used by major public transit operators in Greater Montreal and Quebec City in the province of Quebec, Canada. It complies with the ISO/IEC 14443 standard for smartcards and can be read by smartphones with an NFC antenna.

The name of the card in French, Carte Opus, is a pun on the word in French for smart cards with embedded chips, carte à puce.

== History ==
=== Prior to Opus ===
When the Montreal metro opened on October 14, 1966, the Commission de transport de Montréal (predecessor to the current Société de transport de Montréal, or STM) introduced a magnetic stripe to its tickets that could be read by its turnstiles and inspected visually when boarding buses. Transfers were stamped onto paper by machines within metro stations and on buses. In 1982 magnetic stripes were added to the local monthly pass, the Carte autobus-métro or CAM card, and then to regional transit passes as they were created, such as the TRAM (TRain, Autobus, Métro) card in 1998.

By 2008, it was estimated that fraud from the current ticketing system cost the STM alone $20 million in lost revenue, and that a smart card system could reduce that by half. To prevent fraud, the Opus card won't work re-tapped five minutes after being tapped.

Transit agencies, led by the STM, began work on the project building the Opus platform in 2000. Testing began in 2005. Turnstiles that incorporate the reader and vending machines were installed in Metro stations; buses had previously been fitted with new fare boxes that incorporate the card reader, in order to ensure the uniformity of methods of payment across Montreal’s transit network and that of its suburbs.

=== Rollout ===
- March 2008 – Deployed for users of the Réseau de transport de Longueuil (RTL) only.
- April 2008 - Progressive kick-off in the STM.
- June 2008 - First bus fares were sold for Réseau de transport de la Capitale (RTC) buses.
- Q4 2008 – Deployed for students on all STM, STL and RTL as well as AMT TRAM users.
- Late Q4 2008 – Deployed for all regular fare users of all three transit authorities as well as Exo TRAM users.
- Q2 2009 – Start of deployment for users of Conseil intermunicipaux de transport (CIT) buses (predecessors of the Exo bus services).
- Q2 2010 – End of deployment for users of CIT systems.

In all, the project cost $217 million to implement, including $169 million for the STM. The project was originally supposed to be implemented in 2006.

Since the reorganization of public transport governance in metropolitan Montreal came into effect on June 1, 2017, the Opus ticketing system has been the property of the Autorité régionale de transport métropolitain (ARTM), which has delegated its management to the STM.

=== Project Concerto ===
On June 5, 2018, the STM announced a new project named "Céleste" that would provide an account-based fare system that would work with public transit, Bixi, carsharing platforms and taxis. Fare capping would be applied automatically, and fare collection could be done by tapping either an Opus card, smartphone or smart watch. The STM decided to develop the project without the ARTM's involvement, given that the agency had only been created a year prior, and involve them when they were ready for it.

In 2019 the STM ran tests for paying fares at turnstiles using an Android phone and reloading Opus cards by smartphone. In October 2019, however, the ARTM presented a legal opinion stating that the business model for Céleste is illegal; despite the STM's legal opinions to the contrary, Project Céleste lost support from some municipal politicians and was suspended.

In 2021, the ARTM launched a new digital mobility project, with a call for vendors to provide services. Project Concerto, as its name was announced in 2023, seeks to allow for:

- Reloading Opus cards from a smartphone (rolled out to the public in April 2024).
- Paying fares by tapping a debit or credit card directly; a pilot project launched in 2024 with the STL and Exo bus networks is trialling this.
- Allow account-based ticketing; the ARTM reduced its requirements for potential vendors in October 2024 following a lack of interest from the private sector, following which tests began in May 2025.

== Card types ==
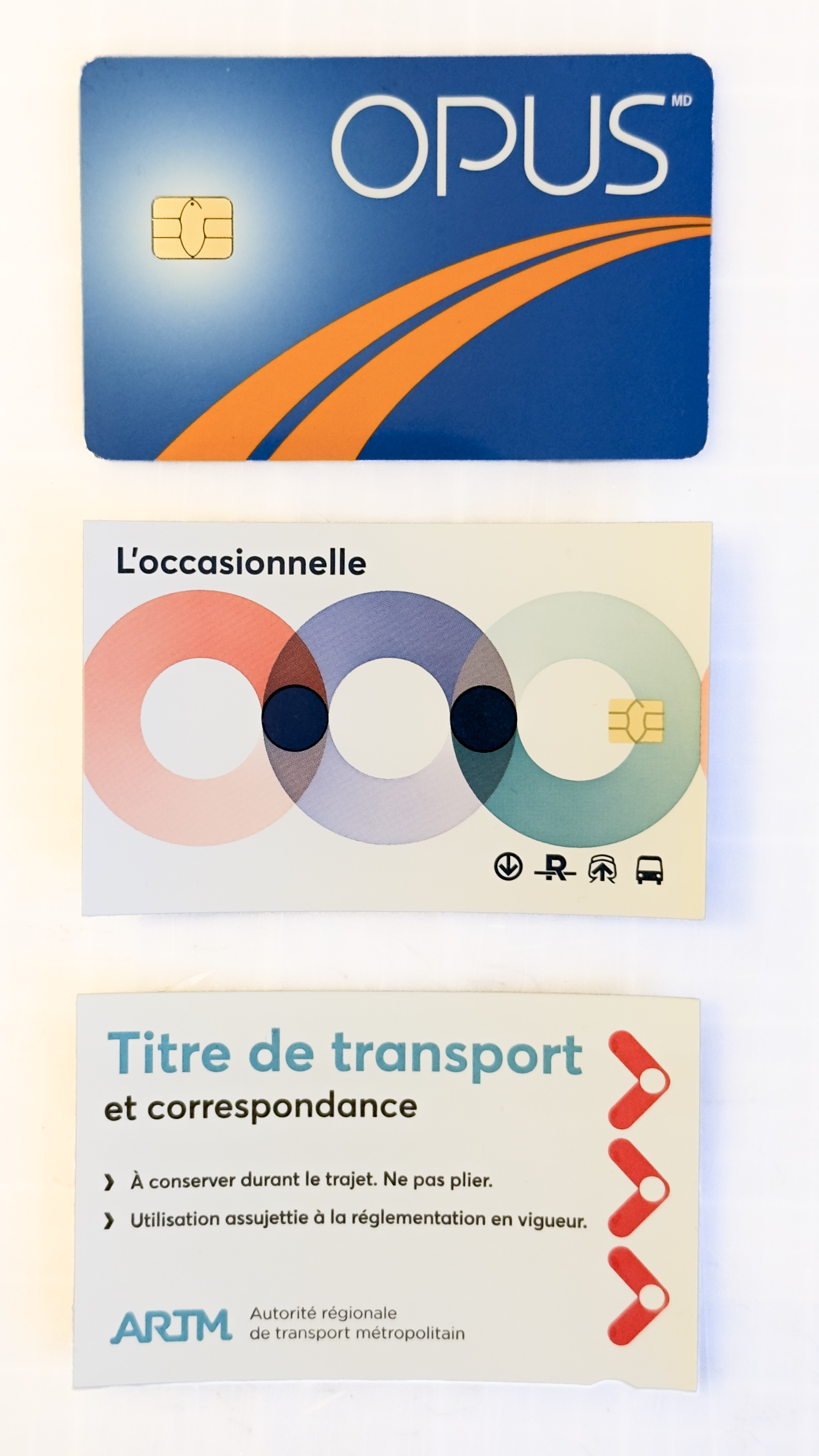
Three ARTM fare cards from March 2025, side by side: a plastic reloadable RFID Opus card, a cardboard RFID L'occasionnelle card, and a cardboard magnetic stripe single-use Zone A fare card

The Opus system is card-based and not account-based. This allows fare control systems on buses or stations to operate without a live internet connection.

=== Reloadable Opus card ===
Durable plastic reloadable cards can hold up to four types of fares simultaneously and can be reloaded as long as its valid. In general, a new Opus card costs CAD$6. They can last up to seven years but, depending on the type, can expire after as little as one year. Reduced fares (e.g. children, students or seniors) will require a designated OPUS card with photo ID printed on it that costs more.

When the ARTM introduced new fare zones in Greater Montreal in 2023, technical constraints prevented fares covering different zones from appearing on the same physical Opus card. The ARTM now sells designated All Modes AB, ABC, ABCD cards.

=== Paper cards ===
Certain limited-use fares can be purchased on cardboard smartcards called L'Occasionnelle in Greater Montreal and Occasionnelle in Quebec City area. They can hold bundles of tickets but are single-use and cannot be reloaded.

The STM still supports the magnetic stripe cards for single fares or transfers from buses. These cards can be used anywhere in Zone A, but must be validated and stamped with a date and time in an STM bus or metro before using on another agency's network in the zone.

== Fares ==
Fares available depend on the territory and the transit agency. All agencies in Greater Montreal use the Autorité régionale de transport métropolitain's integrated fare system. Agencies in Quebec City have their own fares.

Unlike other transit cards, such as Presto (Ontario) and Compass (Metro Vancouver), the Opus is not a stored-value system; the card stores tickets and passes, not a dollar value.

== Points of sale ==
Vending machines that sell or refill Opus cards
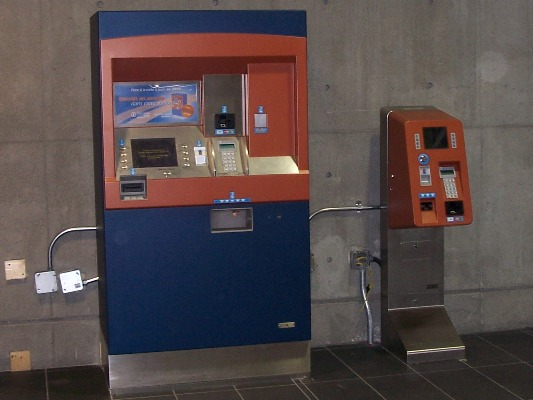
Typical vending machine (left) and recharging station (right) inside the Cartier Metro station.

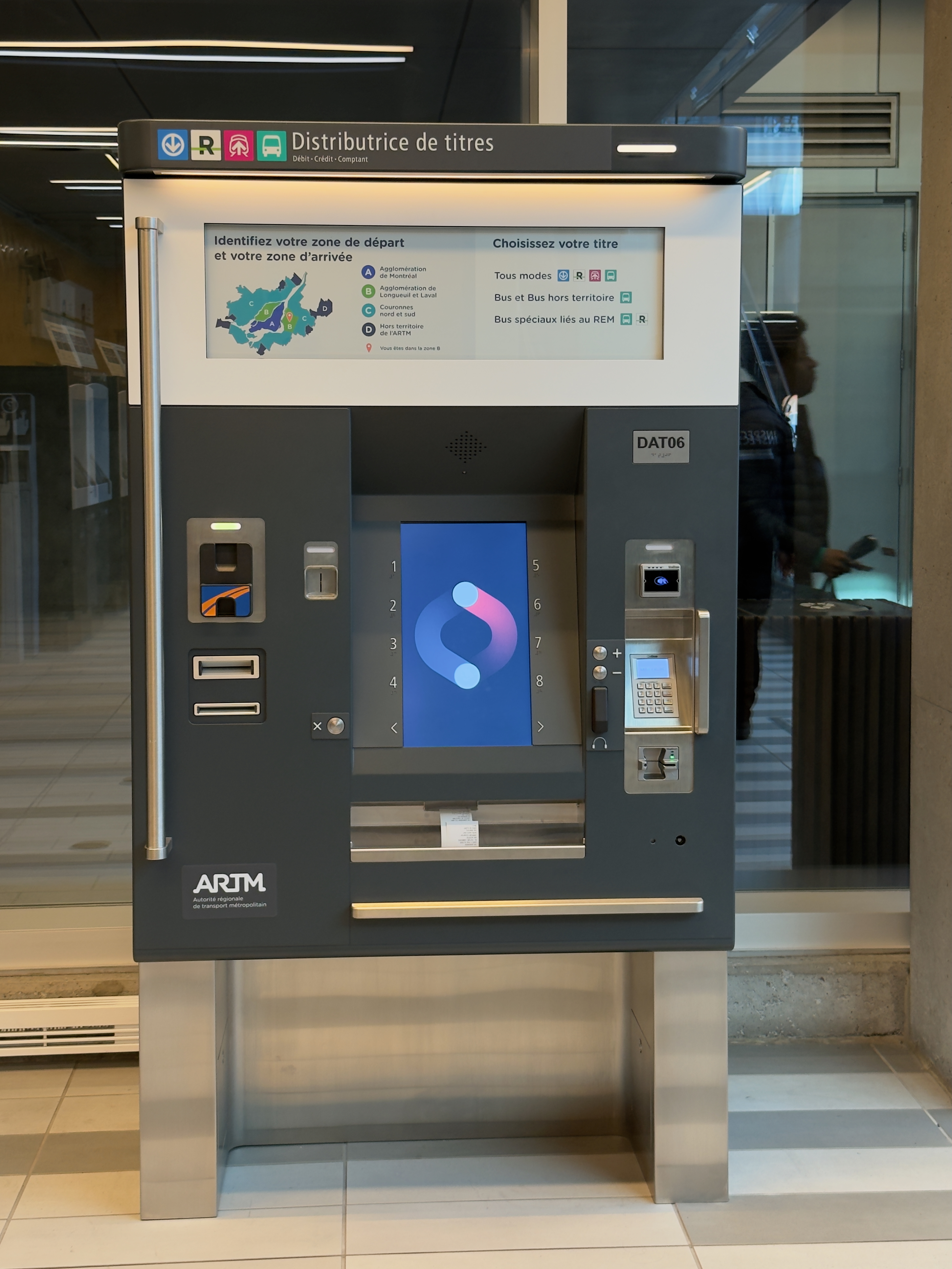
Touchscreen vending machine in Panama REM station.

Opus and Occasionnelle cards are available at various points of sale where local transit fares are currently sold. Opus with photo ID cards are only available from certain locations managed by agencies.

Automated ticketing machines that refill Opus cards and sell Occasionnelle cards stations can be found at Montreal Metro, REM and train stations, metropolitan bus terminals, as well as from specified retailers where local transit fares are sold.

Since 1 April 2024 transit users can reload fares on their physical Opus card using their phone's NFC reader using their agency's mobile app.

== Fare collection ==
Fare collection card readers
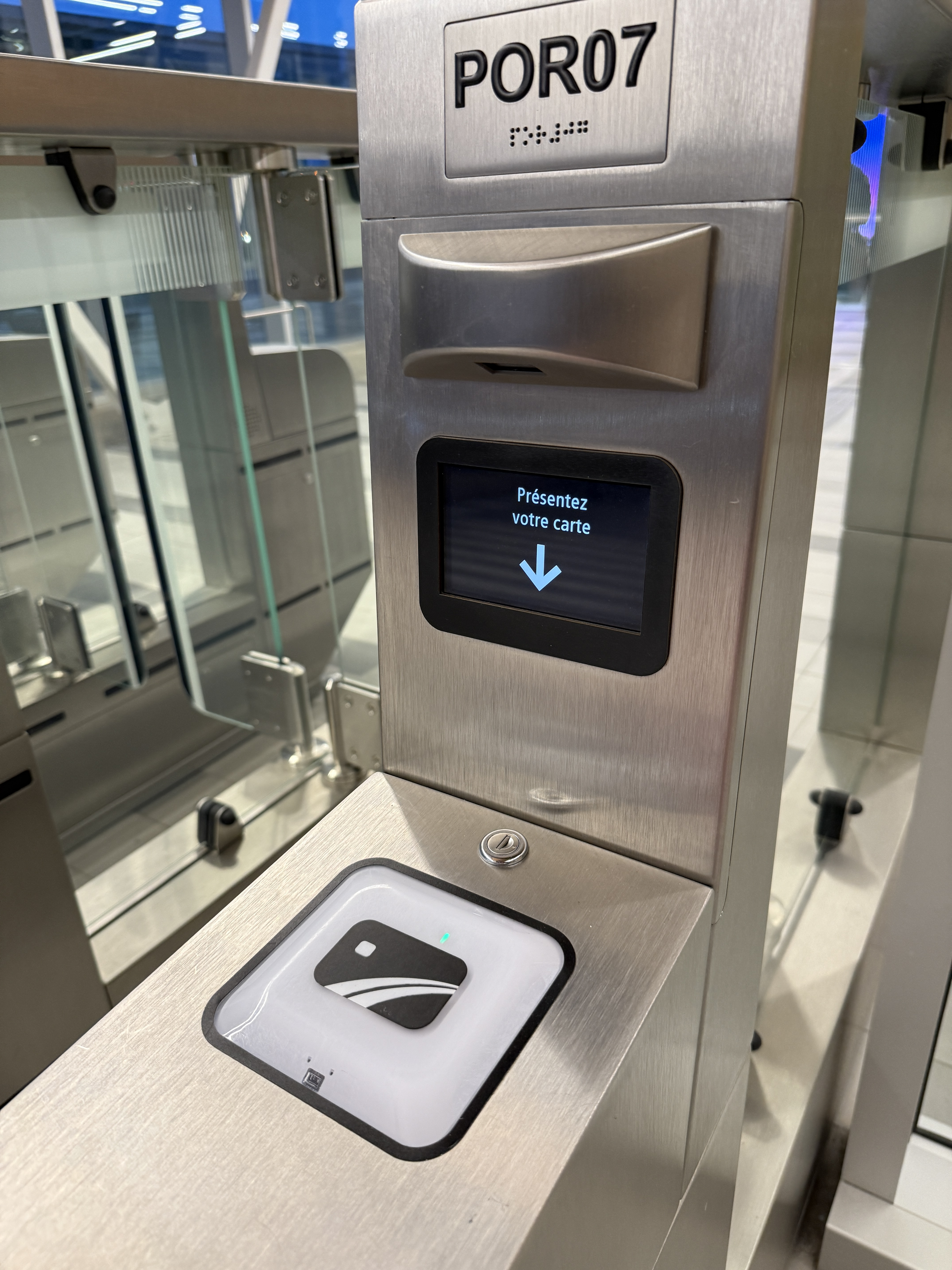
Card reader built into an fare gate at Brossard station on the REM.

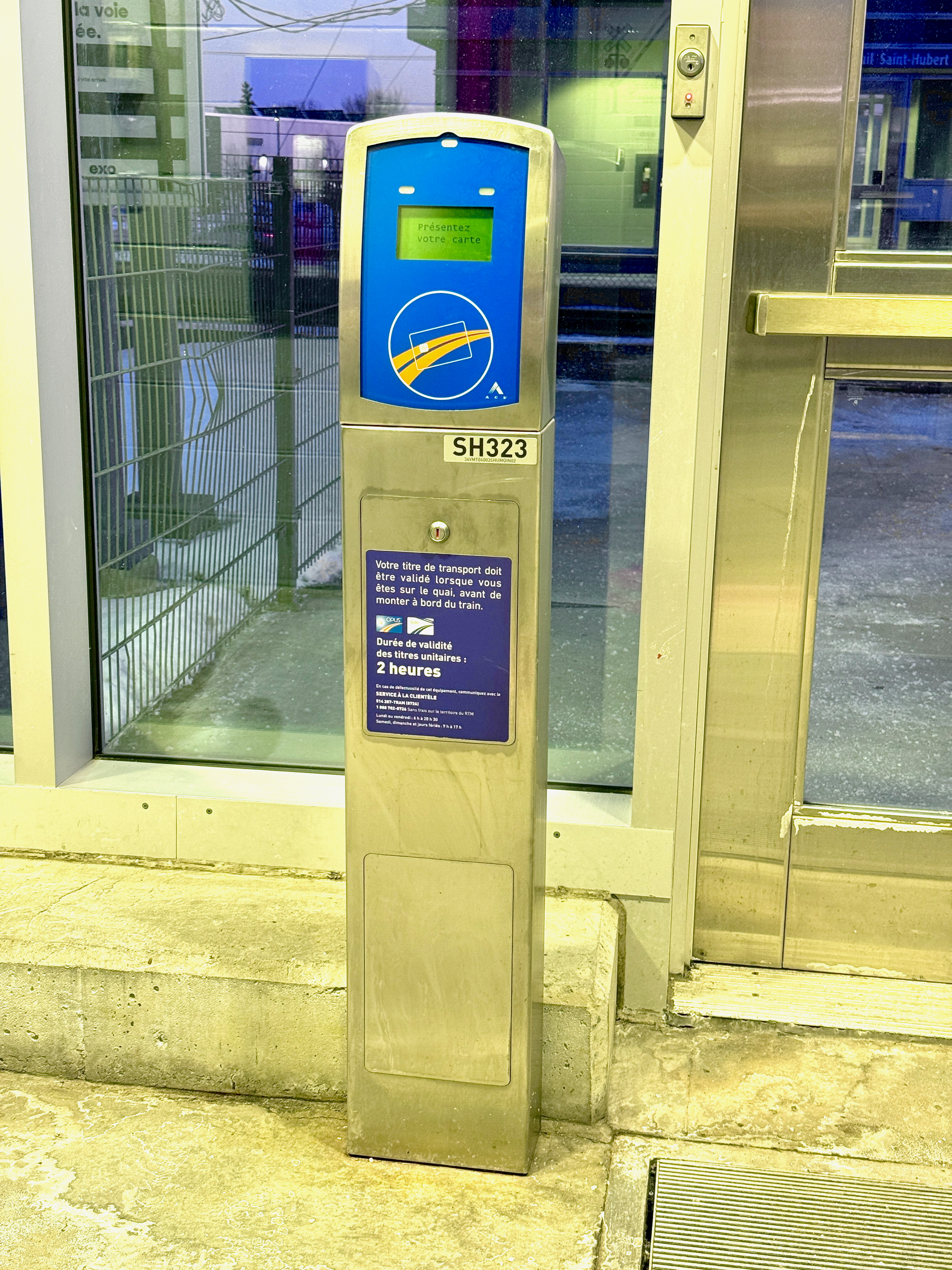
Card validator in front of the doors at platform 1 of Longueuil–Saint-Hubert station.

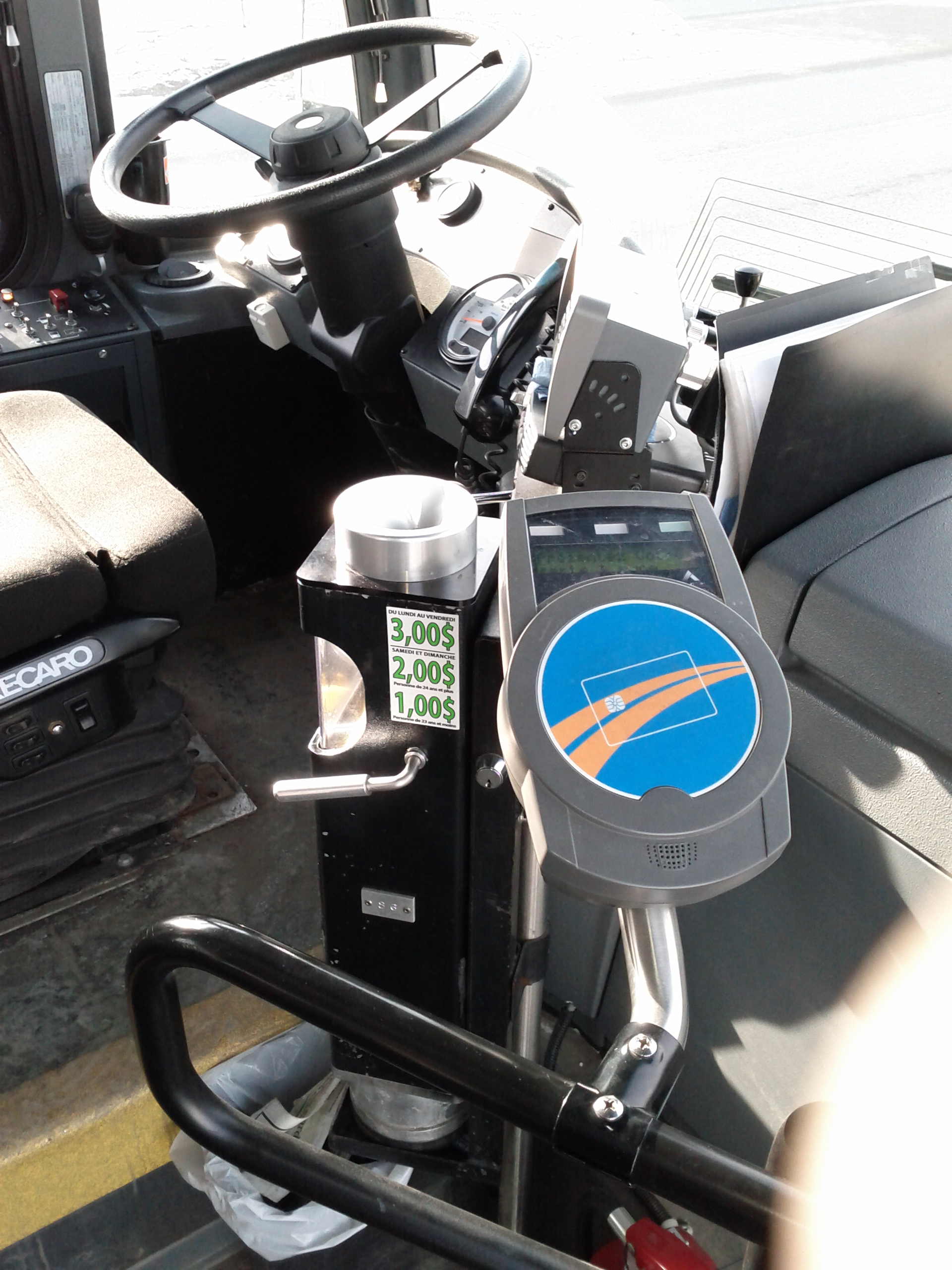
Opus card reader on a bus of the Société de transport de Lévis.

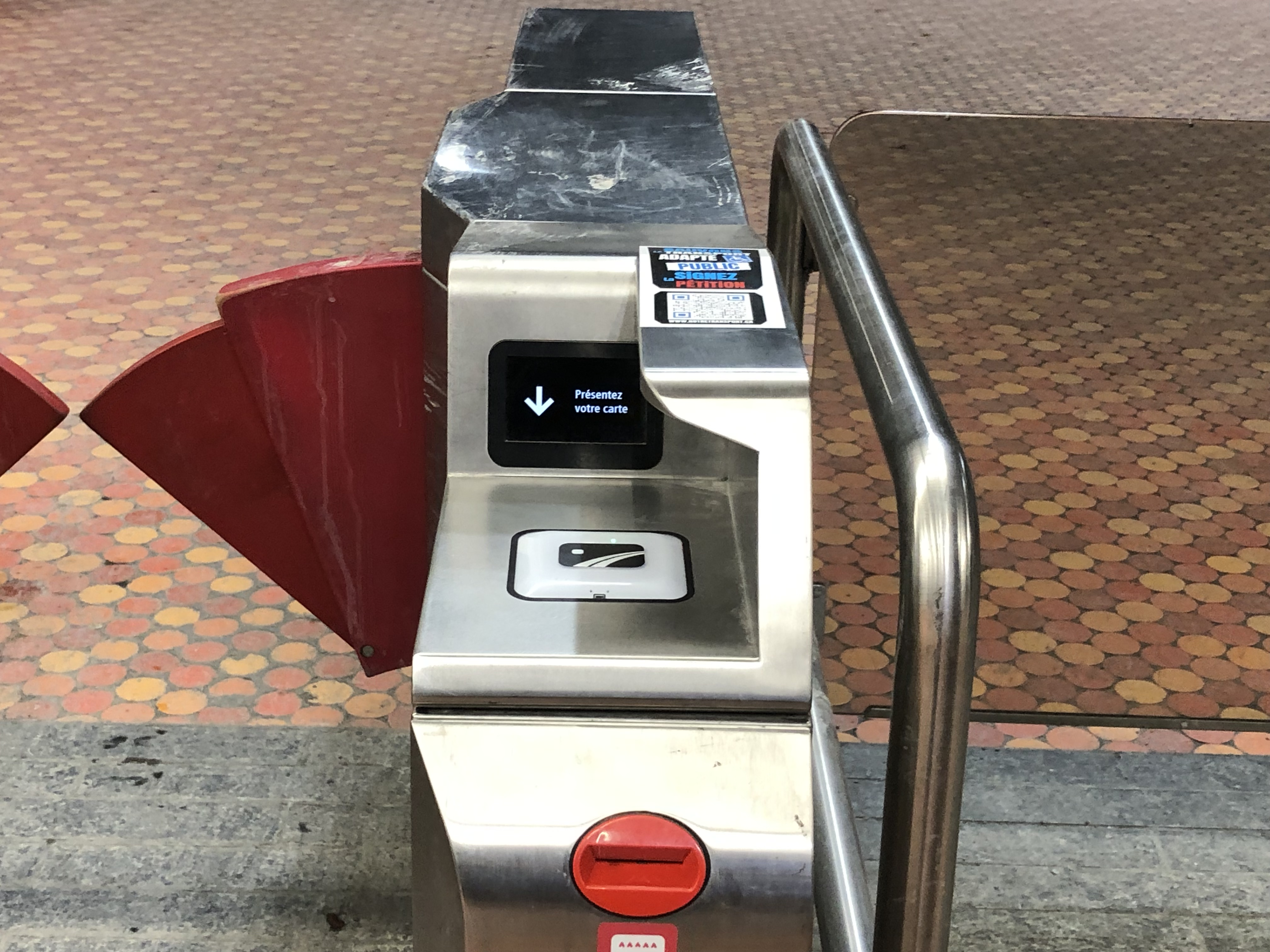
An Opus card reader on a turnstile at the Lionel-Groulx Metro station.

There are several methods of fare collection depending on the mode of transport and the operator:

- On the Montreal Metro and the Réseau express métropolitain, turnstiles or fare gates include a validator to allow passengers access to the platforms.
- For commuter rail in Montreal, passengers must validate their Opus card either on the platform or at the door leading to the platform.
- On buses, validation is done upon boarding using a validator terminal installed at the front of the vehicle near the driver. STM also has validators at the rear doors of articulated buses only.
- For paratransit services, passengers must present their photo Opus card when boarding.

== Participating transit authorities ==
- Agencies in Greater Montreal under the ARTM:
  - Société de transport de Montréal
  - Exo
  - Réseau de transport de Longueuil
  - Société de transport de Laval
  - Réseau express métropolitain
  - Navark river shuttle lines N2, N3 and N6 (Only with monthly or annual passes specific to the ARTM zone that each line operates in).
  - Croisières AML river shuttle lines N4 and N5 (only with weekly, monthly, and 4-month All modes A passes, as well as monthly All modes AB, ABC, or ABCD passes).
- Réseau de transport de la Capitale
- Société de transport de Lévis
- Société des traversiers du Québec
- Transport MRC de Joliette

=== Former participants ===
- The initial project included local suburban bus transit agencies outside of Montreal and the Agence métropolitaine de transport, that was responsible for the Montreal commuter rail network. These services have now all been rolled into Exo.
- Bixi supported Opus cards from 2017 to 2021 for one-way trips if the card was linked to a Bixi account.

== Criticisms ==
The Opus card has been widely criticized for its lack of stored-value capability and for being able to load only four types of tickets/passes simultaneously, factors that significantly reduce the capability and flexibility that would have otherwise been gained from a stored-value system.

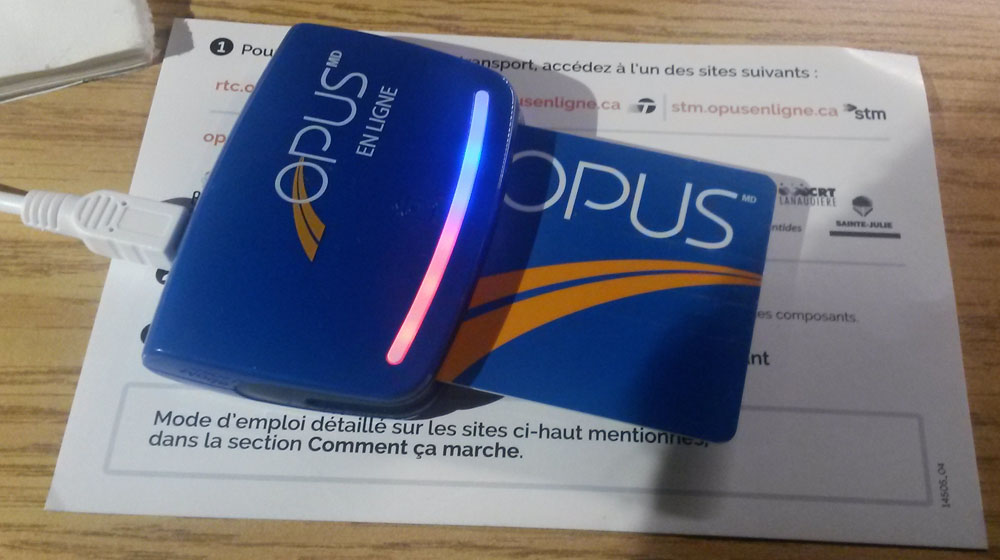
Personal card reader for reloading Opus cards using the contact interface

When the STM unveiled its USB card reader for loading fares at home in 2015, it was already derided for appearing archaic and not leveraging smartphone technology. In August 2023, a McGill student published code for an Android app that can use a phone's NFC capability and an Opus en ligne account to load new fares on an Opus card instead of using the dedicated USB reader. The ARTM quickly asked him to retract his code base and did not publish a similar service until April 2024.

== See also ==
- List of smart cards
