= Montmorency station (Montreal Metro) =

Montreal Metro station

Montmorency
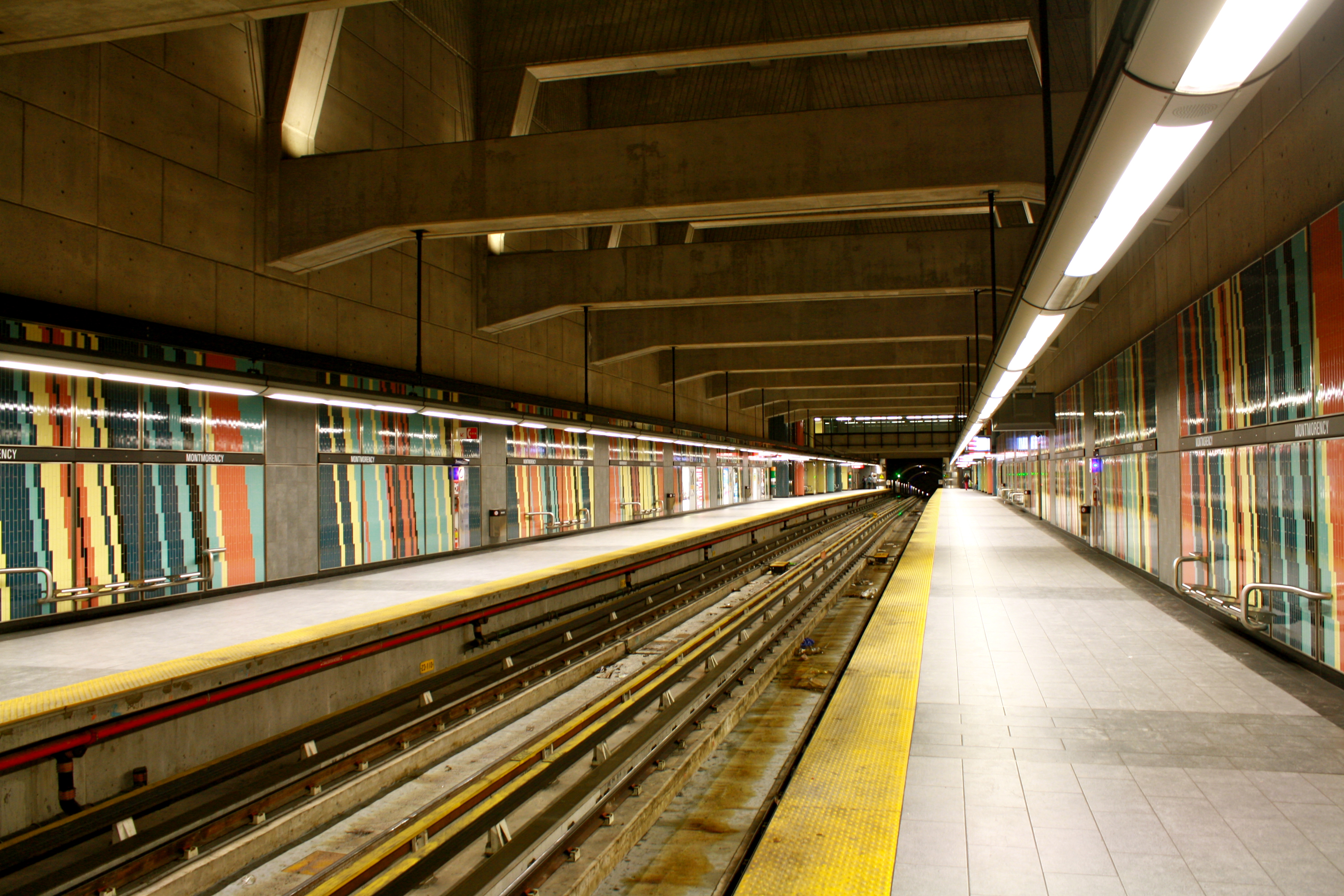

General information
- Location: 1800, rue Jacques-Tétreault; Laval, Quebec H7N 0A5; Canada
- Coordinates: 45°33′31″N 73°43′18″W
- Operator: Société de transport de Montréal
- Platforms: 2 side platforms
- Tracks: 2
- Connections: Terminus Montmorency

Construction
- Depth: 20 metres (65 feet 7 inches), 18th deepest
- Accessible: Yes
- Architect: Guillermo Farregut

Other information
- Station code: 288
- Fare zone: ARTM: B

History
- Opened: April 26, 2007

Passengers
- 2024: 4,742,611 ▲9.6%
- Rank: 18 of 68

Services
Preceding station	Montreal Metro	Following station
De la Concorde toward Côte-Vertu	Orange Line	Terminus
Track layout
Location

Montmorency station (French pronunciation: [mɔ̃mɔʁɑ̃si]) is a Montreal Metro station in Laval, Quebec, Canada, operated by the Société de transport de Montréal (STM). It is located in the Laval-des-Rapides borough. The station is part of an extension to Laval and opened on April 28, 2007, becoming the northern terminus of the Orange Line. After two years of opening, the Metro had generated over 60,000 daily passengers, around twice what had originally been estimated.

== Overview ==
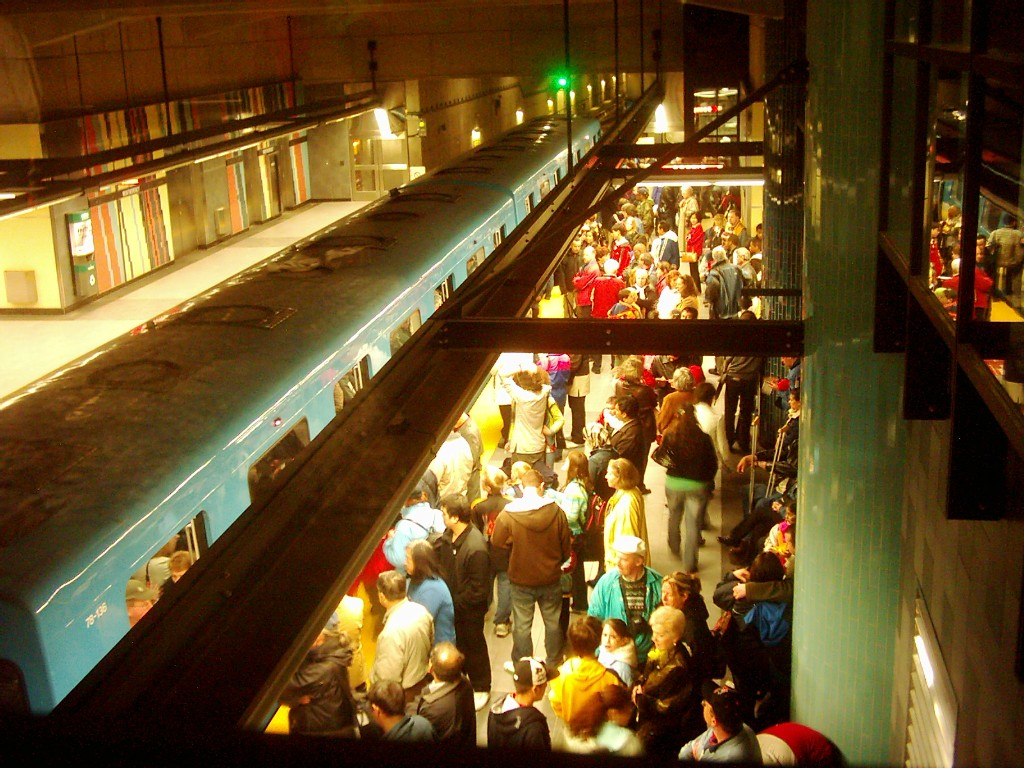
Montmorency station during rush hour.

It is a normal side platform station. This station has the highest ceilings of any station in the network. The wall panels are decorated with tiling in diagonal stripes of retro shades of cyan, navy, straw yellow and brick red.

The station is equipped with the MétroVision information screens which displays news, commercials, and the waiting time until the arrival of the next train.

This station has underground city access to the Université de Montréal’s Laval campus.

== Origin of name ==
The station is located across the street from Cégep Montmorency. The CEGEP got its name from François de Montmorency-Laval (1623–1703), the first bishop of Quebec and New France from 1674 to 1688.

== Terminus Montmorency ==
Terminus Montmorency

General information
- Location: 545, Lucien-Paiement Street, Laval, Quebec
- Coordinates: 45°33′29″N 73°43′16″W
- Owner: ARTM
- Operator: Société de transport de Laval
- Bus operators: Société de transport de Laval; Exo bus services

Construction
- Parking: 1217 park and ride spaces
- Cycle facilities: 300 place racks
- Accessible: Yes

Other information
- Fare zone: ARTM: B
- Website: Terminus Montmorency

Passengers
- 2016: 6,331,700
Location

A large bus terminus with 10 platforms and an indoor waiting area adjoins the station. The building, which is operated by the ARTM features an ARTM ticket counter as well as a convenience store and a coffee shop. In addition, the station has parking for 1342 cars – 644 free outdoor park and ride spaces and 698 paying spaces (54 outdoor, 644 indoor). The indoor spaces cost $7 a day or $80 per month (if a user purchases a monthly parking pass). All bus traffic enters and leaves on boulevard de l'Avenir, while all parking spaces are accessed via rue Lucien Paiement.

=== Connecting bus routes ===
Société de transport de Laval
No.	Route	Connects to	Services times / notes
2 ♿︎	Métro Montmorency - Métro Henri-Bourassa	Henri-Bourassa; Cartier; De La Concorde	Late-night shuttle
26	Métro Montmorency - Station Sainte-Dorothée	Sainte-Dorothée	Daily
33 ♿︎	Métro Montmorency - Métro Cartier	De La Concorde; Cartier	Daily
36	Métro Montmorency - Chomedey		Weekdays, peak only
39 ♿︎	Terminus Le Carrefour - Auteuil	Terminus Le Carrefour	Daily
40	Métro Montmorency - Chomedey		Daily
42	Terminus Le Carrefour - Saint-François	De La Concorde; Terminus Le Carrefour	Daily
45 ♿︎	Métro Montmorency - Auteuil	Vimont	Daily
46 ♿︎	Métro Montmorency - Laval-Ouest		Daily
50 ♿︎	Terminus Le Carrefour - Saint-Vincent-de-Paul	Terminus Le Carrefour; Pie-IX BRT	Daily
56	Métro Montmorency - Sainte-Dorothée	Terminus Le Carrefour	Daily
61	Métro Montmorency - Fabreville	Terminus Le Carrefour	Daily
63 ♿︎	Métro Cartier - Gare Sainte-Rose	Terminus Le Carrefour; Cartier; Sainte-Rose	Daily
65	Métro Montmorency - Gare Sainte-Rose	Sainte-Rose	Daily
70 ♿︎	Métro Cartier - Métro Montmorency	Terminus Le Carrefour; Cartier	Daily
76	Métro Montmorency - Station Sainte-Dorothée	Sainte-Dorothée	Daily
226	Métro Montmorency - Sainte-Dorothée		Weekdays, peak only
345 ♿︎	Métro Henri-Bourassa - Gare Vimont	Henri-Bourassa; Cartier; De La Concorde; Vimont	Late-night shuttle
903	Métro Montmorency - Station Sainte-Dorothée	Terminus Le Carrefour; Sainte-Dorothée	Daily
Exo Laurentides sector
No.	Route	Connects to	Services times / notes
509	Saint-Jérôme - Laval Express	Saint-Jérôme	Weekdays only
707	Boisbriand - Laval (métro Montmorency)		Weekdays, peak only
708	Saint-Eustache - Laval (Métro Montmorency)	Deux-Montagnes; Terminus Le Carrefour (partial service)	Daily
709	Saint-Jérôme - Laval	Sainte-Thérèse; Saint-Jérôme	Daily
YMX	YMX Express		Weekdays only, AM towards YMX and PM towards Montmorency
Exo Terrebonne-Mascouche sector
No.	Route	Connects to	Services times / notes
19	Terrebonne - Terminus Montmorency	Terminus Terrebonne	Daily

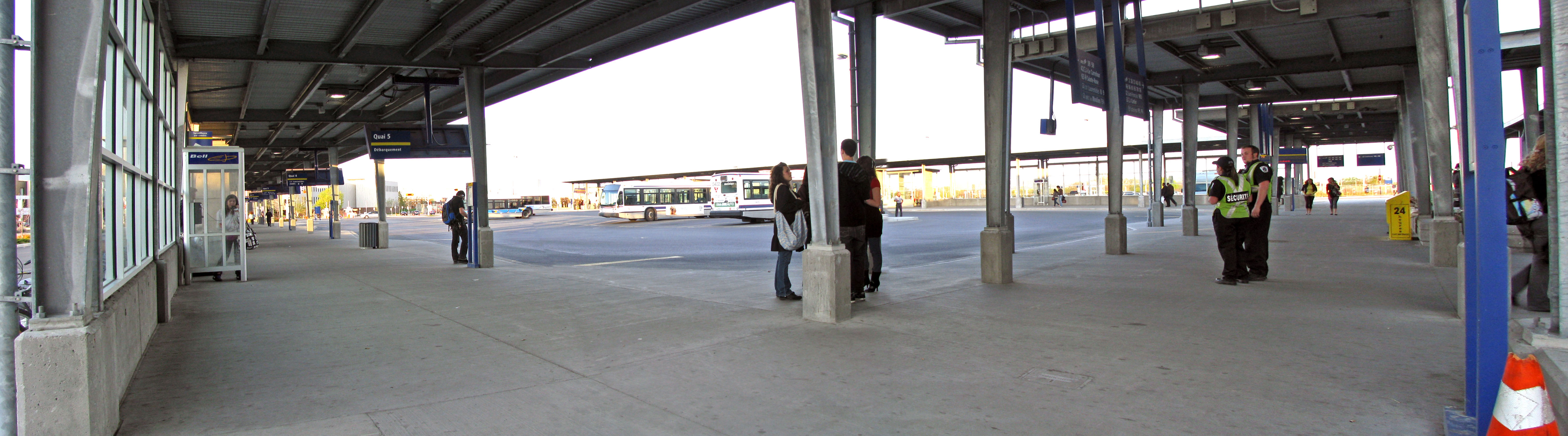
Panoramic view of the Terminus Montmorency. To the right is the entrance to the Metro station.

== Nearby points of interest ==
- Cégep Montmorency
- Centre Laval
- Espace Montmorency
- Place Bell

== See also ==
- List of park and rides in Greater Montreal
