= Terminus Le Carrefour =

Coordinates: 45°34′07″N 73°44′54″W

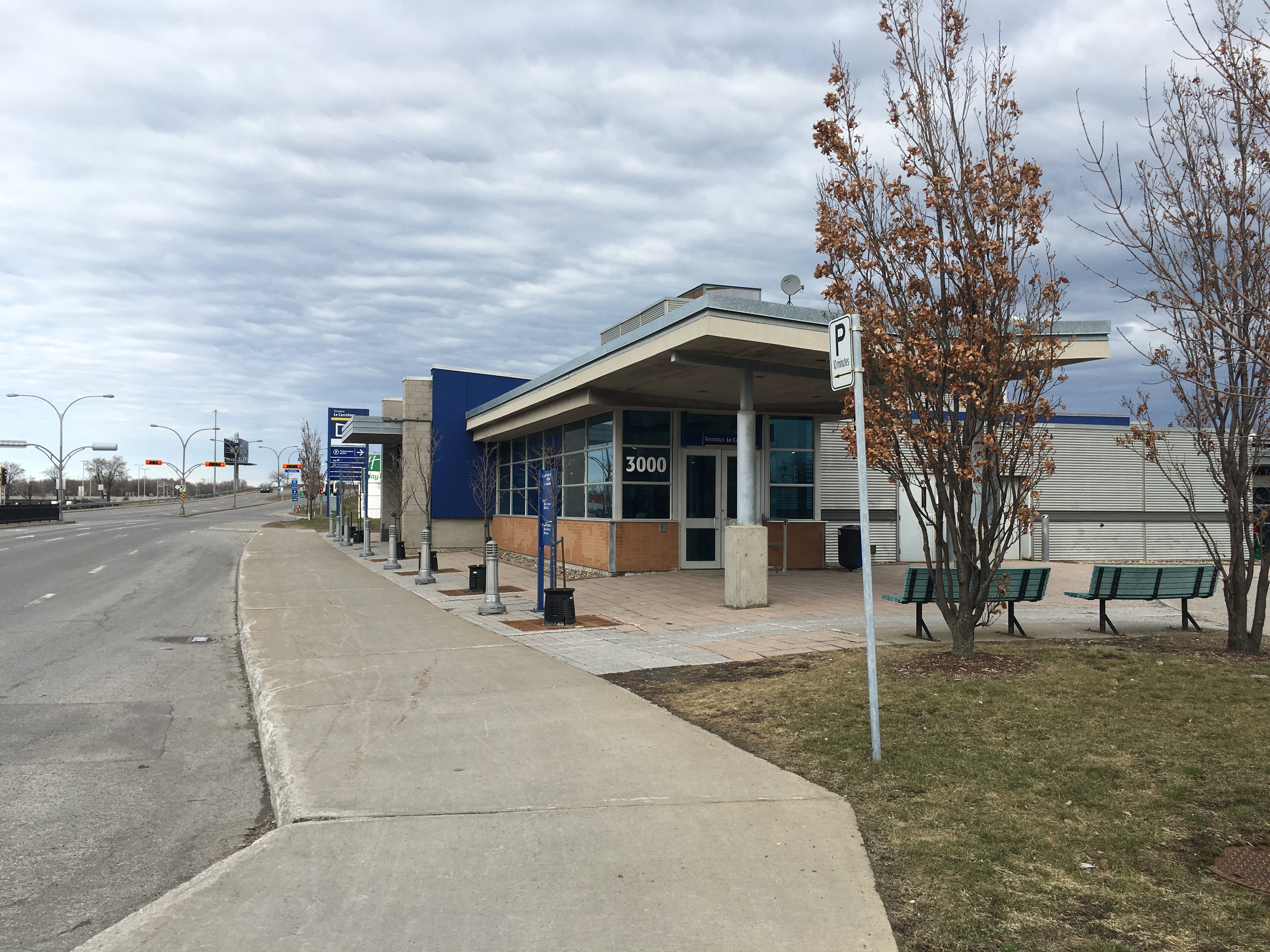

General information
- Location: 3000, boul. Le Carrefour, Laval, Quebec; Canada
- Owner: ARTM
- Bus operators: Société de transport de Laval; Exo bus services

Construction
- Parking: 226 park and ride spaces
- Cycle facilities: 63 places

Other information
- Fare zone: ARTM: B

History
- Rebuilt: Société de transport de Laval

Passengers
- 2016: 401,500 (Exo)
Location

Terminus Le Carrefour is an ARTM bus terminus across boulevard Le Carrefour from the Carrefour Laval at the corner of Terry Fox Avenue. It is one block west of Autoroute 15. A Radisson Hotel is located between Terry Fox Avenue and the Autoroute, and a Hilton Hotel and a Sheraton Hotel are nearby.

South of the terminus are 226 park and ride spaces.

== Connecting bus routes ==
Société de transport de Laval
No.	Route	Connects to	Services times / notes
39 ♿︎	Terminus Le Carrefour - Auteuil	Montmorency	Daily
42	Terminus Le Carrefour - Saint-François	De la Concorde	Daily
50 ♿︎	Terminus Le Carrefour - Saint-Vincent-de-Paul	Montmorency; Pie-IX BRT	Daily
56	Métro Montmorency - Sainte-Dorothée	Montmorency	Daily
60 ♿︎	Métro Cartier - Chomedey	Cartier	Daily
61	Métro Montmorency - Fabreville	Montmorency	Daily
63 ♿︎	Métro Cartier - Gare Sainte-Rose	Cartier; Sainte-Rose	Daily
66 ♿︎	Terminus Le Carrefour - Sainte-Dorothée		Daily
70 ♿︎	Métro Cartier - Métro Montmorency	Montmorency; Cartier	Daily
903	Métro Montmorency - Station Sainte-Dorothée	Montmorency; Sainte-Dorothée	Daily
Exo Laurentides sector
No.	Route	Connects to	Services times / notes
708	Saint-Eustache - Laval (Métro Montmorency) (partial service)	Montmorency; Deux-Montagnes	Daily

== See also ==
- List of park and rides in Greater Montreal
