= Société de transport de Lévis =

Public transportation agency in Lévis, Quebec

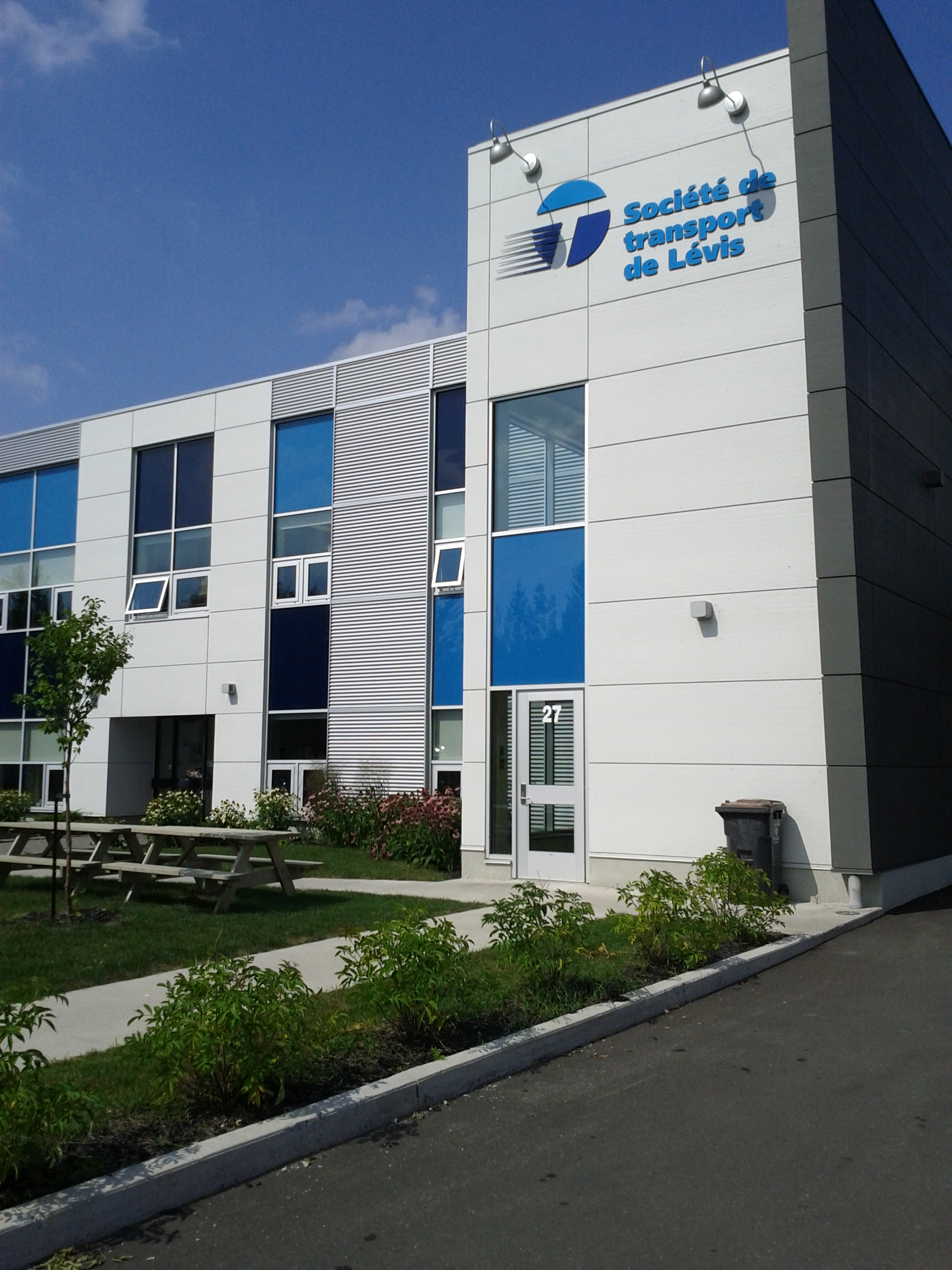
- Founded: 2002
- Headquarters: 1100 rue Saint-Omer
- Locale: Lévis, Quebec, Canada
- Service type: bus service, paratransit
- Alliance: Some routes operated by Autocars des Chutes
- Routes: 75
- Stops: 1,700
- Destinations: Lévis, Quebec City
- Fleet: Nova Bus LFS, LFS Artic, LFS HEV, Grande West Vicinity
- Annual ridership: 4.2 million (2016)
- Fuel type: B2 diesel
- Chief executive: Jean-François Carrier
- Website: stlevis.ca (French)

The Société de transport de Lévis (French pronunciation: [sɔsjete də tʁɑ̃spɔʁ də levi]) also known as STLevis (Lévis Transit Corporation) is a public transportation agency created in 1980, operating mainly in Lévis on the south shore of the Saint Lawrence River, being the counterpart of the Réseau de transport de la Capitale (RTC) on the north side. STLevis offers connections between Lévis and Quebec City; RTC buses currently do not have any services to the south shore.

== Description ==
The STLévis serves a population of about 150,000 on a territory of 551.5 km^{2} (212.9 sq mi) in the region of Chaudière-Appalaches, including Lévis and the municipality of Saint-Lambert-de-Lauzon. The corporation operates 59 40ft low-floor diesel vehicles, 23 40ft low-floor hybrid vehicles, 12 articulated buses, and employs 190 people. In 2016, it served more than 4.2 million riders.

The agency owns and operates a 7,500 m² bus depot in the Desjardins borough of the city. Built in 1986, the depot was renovated in the early 2010s to increase its bus storage capacity and the number of maintenance spots.

== Routes ==
The STLevis offers an up-to-date list of routes.

=== Lévisien routes ===
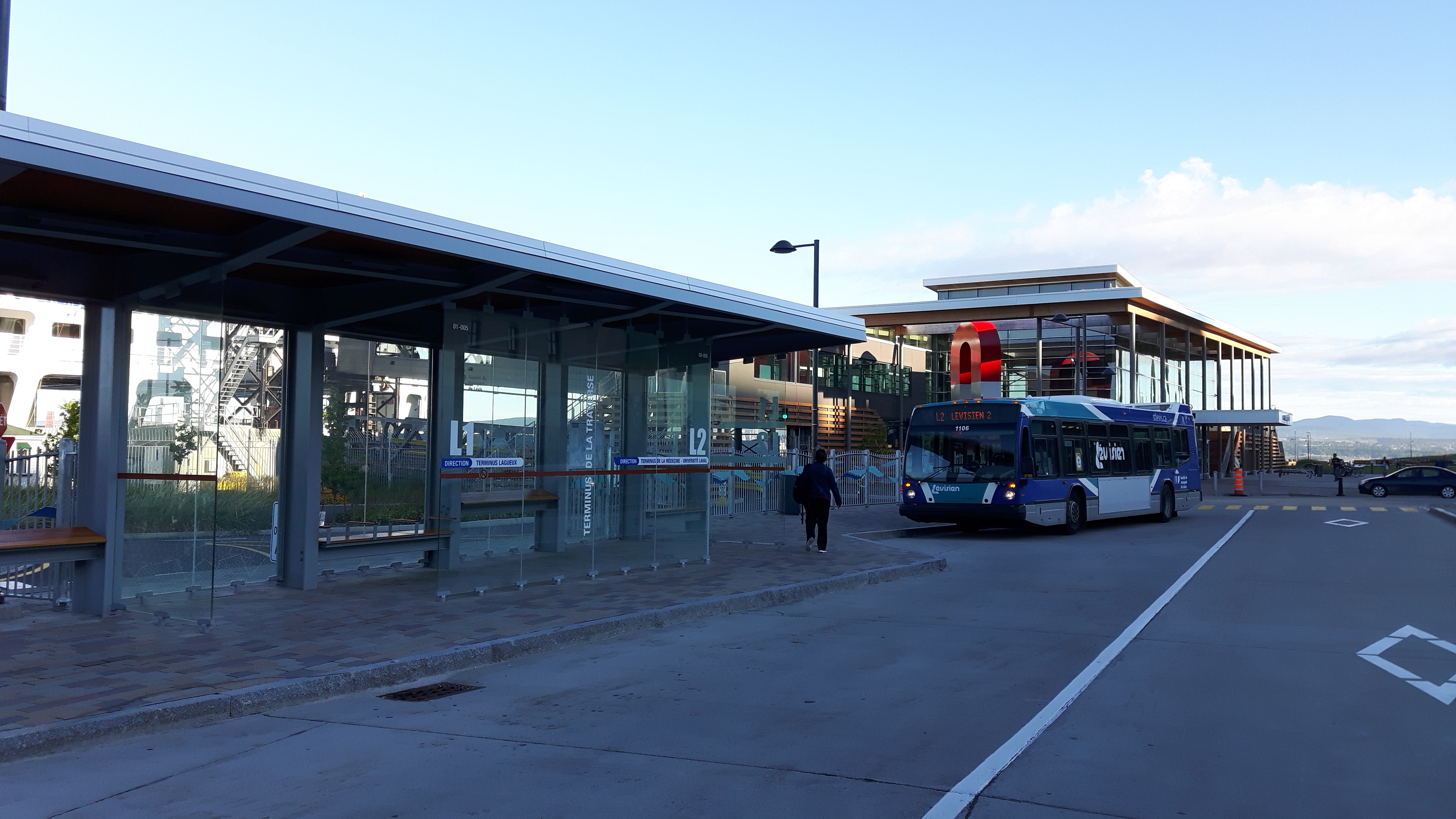
A STLévis Nova Bus low-floor bus in Lévisien livery at the Ferry terminal in Lévis.

- Lévisien-1- Lauzon-Lagueux
- Lévisien-2- Traverse-Université Laval
- Lévisien-3- Lagueux-Université Laval

=== Local routes, Desjardins / Chaudière-Est ===
11/11A- Traverse > Hôtel-Dieu > UQAR > Lauzon > / Traverse > Lauzon > UQAR > Hôtel-Dieu > (new route, June 2014)

- 13- St-David-Traverse
- 15- Traverse - Pintendre
- 34-St-Romuald-de la Concorde Station
- 31- Breakeyville - de la Concorde Station
- 37/38-Saint-Romuald - Saint-Jean-Chrysostome
- 39-St-Jean-Chrysostome - de la Concorde Station
- 35/36-Charny - de la Concorde Station

=== Local routes, Chaudière-Ouest ===
- 22 - Saint-Nicolas South - Des Rivières Park & Ride
- 23 - Saint-Nicolas North - Des Rivières Park & Ride
- 24 - Saint-Rédempteur - Des Rivières Park & Ride

=== Express services (weekdays only) ===
- ELQ / ESQ / ECQ - Express Lévis / Saint-Jean-Chrysostome / Charny - Downtown Quebec
- EOQ - Express Des Rivières Park & Ride - Downtown Quebec
- 37E /38E / 34E / 36E - Saint-Jean-Chrysostome / Saint-Romuald / Charny - Université Laval
- 42E-Lévis Centre - Cégep Garneau
- 43E - Express Des Rivières Park & Ride - Cégep Garneau
