= Sainte-Rose station =

Railway station in Quebec, Canada

Sainte-Rose
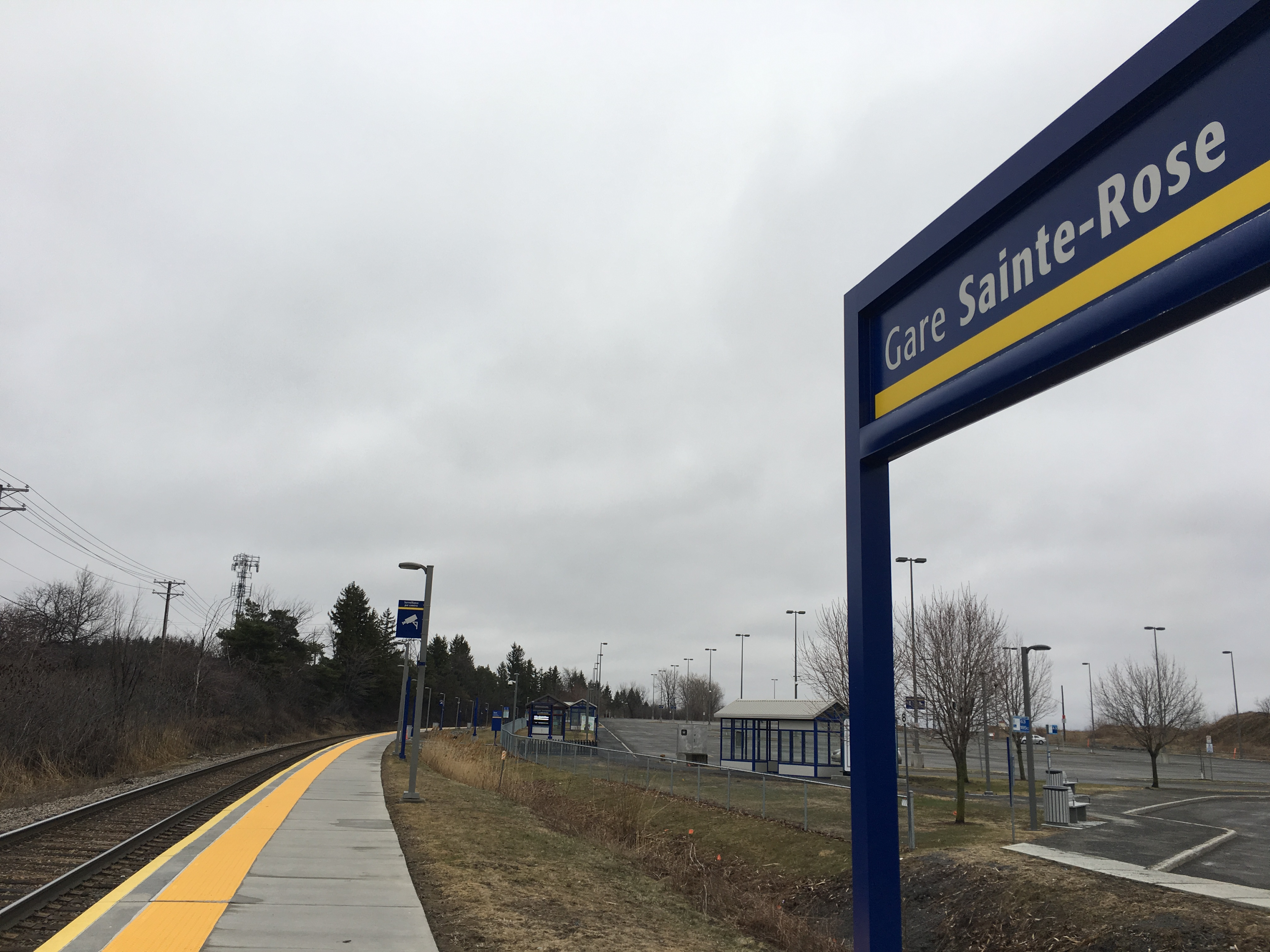

General information
- Location: 99 Sainte-Rose Boulevard East; Laval, Quebec H7H 1N9
- Coordinates: 45°37′33″N 73°45′57″W
- Operator: Exo
- Platforms: 1 side platform
- Tracks: 1
- Connections: Société de transport de Laval

Construction
- Parking: 713 spaces
- Cycle facilities: 46 spaces

Other information
- Fare zone: ARTM: B

History
- Opened: 1997

Passengers
- 2019: 551,900 (Exo)

Services
Preceding station	Exo	Following station
Rosemère toward Saint-Jérôme	Line 12 – Saint-Jérôme	Vimont toward Lucien-L'Allier
Former services
Preceding station	Canadian Pacific Railway	Following station
Rosemère toward Mont-Laurier	Montreal – Mont-Laurier	Saint Martin Junction toward Montreal Place Viger
Location

Sainte-Rose station (French pronunciation: [sɛ̃t ʁoz]) is a commuter rail station operated by Exo in Laval, Quebec, Canada. It is served by the Saint-Jérôme line.

The station is located in ARTM fare zone B, and currently has 713 parking spaces and a bus loop. Prior to the reform of the ARTM's fare structure in July 2022, it was in zone 3.

== Connecting bus routes ==
Société de transport de Laval
No.	Route	Connects to	Service times / notes
63 ♿︎	Métro Cartier - Gare Sainte-Rose	Terminus Le Carrefour; Cartier	Daily
65	Métro Montmorency - Gare Sainte-Rose	Montmorency	Daily
73 ♿︎	Métro Cartier - Fabreville	Cartier	Daily
