= Vimont station =

Railway station in Quebec, Canada

Vimont
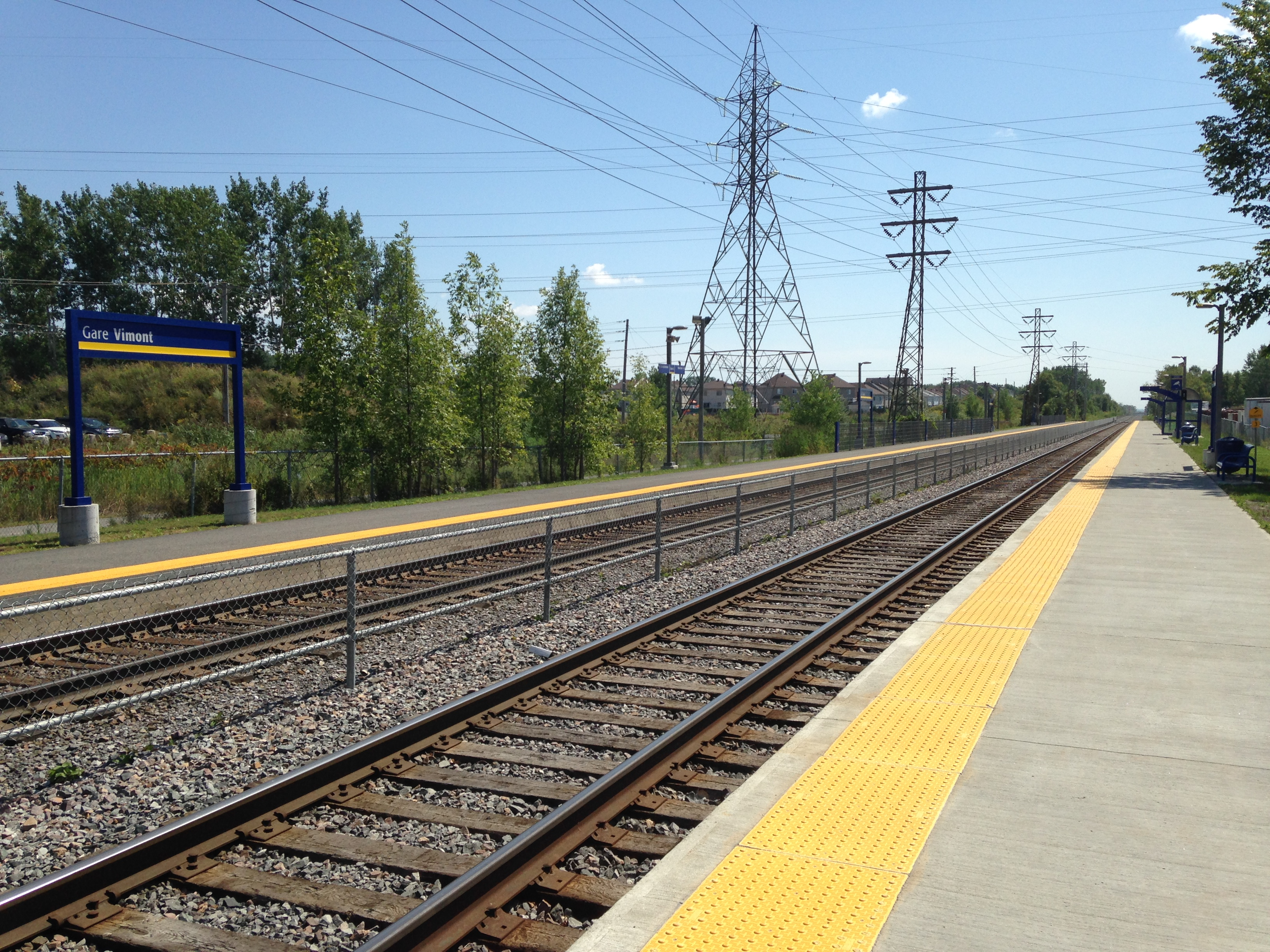

General information
- Location: 150 Bellerose Boulevard West; Laval, Quebec H7K 3B6
- Coordinates: 45°36′16″N 73°44′35″W
- Operator: Exo
- Platforms: 2 side platforms
- Tracks: 2
- Connections: Société de transport de Laval

Construction
- Parking: 470 spaces
- Cycle facilities: 14 spaces

Other information
- Fare zone: ARTM: B

History
- Opened: October 18, 2006

Passengers
- 2019: 333,100

Services
Preceding station	Exo	Following station
Sainte-Rose toward Saint-Jérôme	Line 12 – Saint-Jérôme	De la Concorde toward Lucien-L'Allier
Location

Vimont station (French pronunciation: [vimɔ̃]) is a commuter rail station operated by Exo in Laval, Quebec, Canada. It is served by the Saint-Jérôme line.

The station is in ARTM fare zone B, and currently has 200 parking spaces. Prior to the reform of the ARTM's fare structure in July 2022, it was in zone 3.

== History ==
=== CP Service ===
There was previously a Canadian Pacific Railway station called "Petite-Cote" at this location.

=== AMT Service ===
The station was opened on October 18, 2006, by the former Agence Métropolitaine de Transport (AMT) following growing demand for service following the collapse of the De la Concorde overpass in Laval. The station has since become a permanent stop on the line. Between 2011 and 2013, the double track was extended north through the station, requiring the construction of a second side platform.

=== RTM service ===
On June 1, 2017, the AMT was dissolved and replaced by two new governing bodies, the Autorité régionale de transport métropolitain (ARTM) and the Réseau de transport métropolitain (RTM). The RTM took over all former AMT services, including service at this station.

== Connecting bus routes ==
Société de transport de Laval
No.	Route	Connects to	Service times / notes
27	Métro Cartier - Gare Vimont	Cartier	Daily
45 ♿︎	Métro Montmorency - Auteuil	Montmorency	Daily
48 ♿︎	Métro Cartier - Gare Vimont	Cartier; Pie-IX BRT	Daily
345 ♿︎	Métro Henri-Bourassa - Gare Vimont	Henri-Bourassa; Cartier; De La Concorde; Montmorency	Late-night shuttle
