= De la Concorde station =

Montreal Metro station

De la Concorde
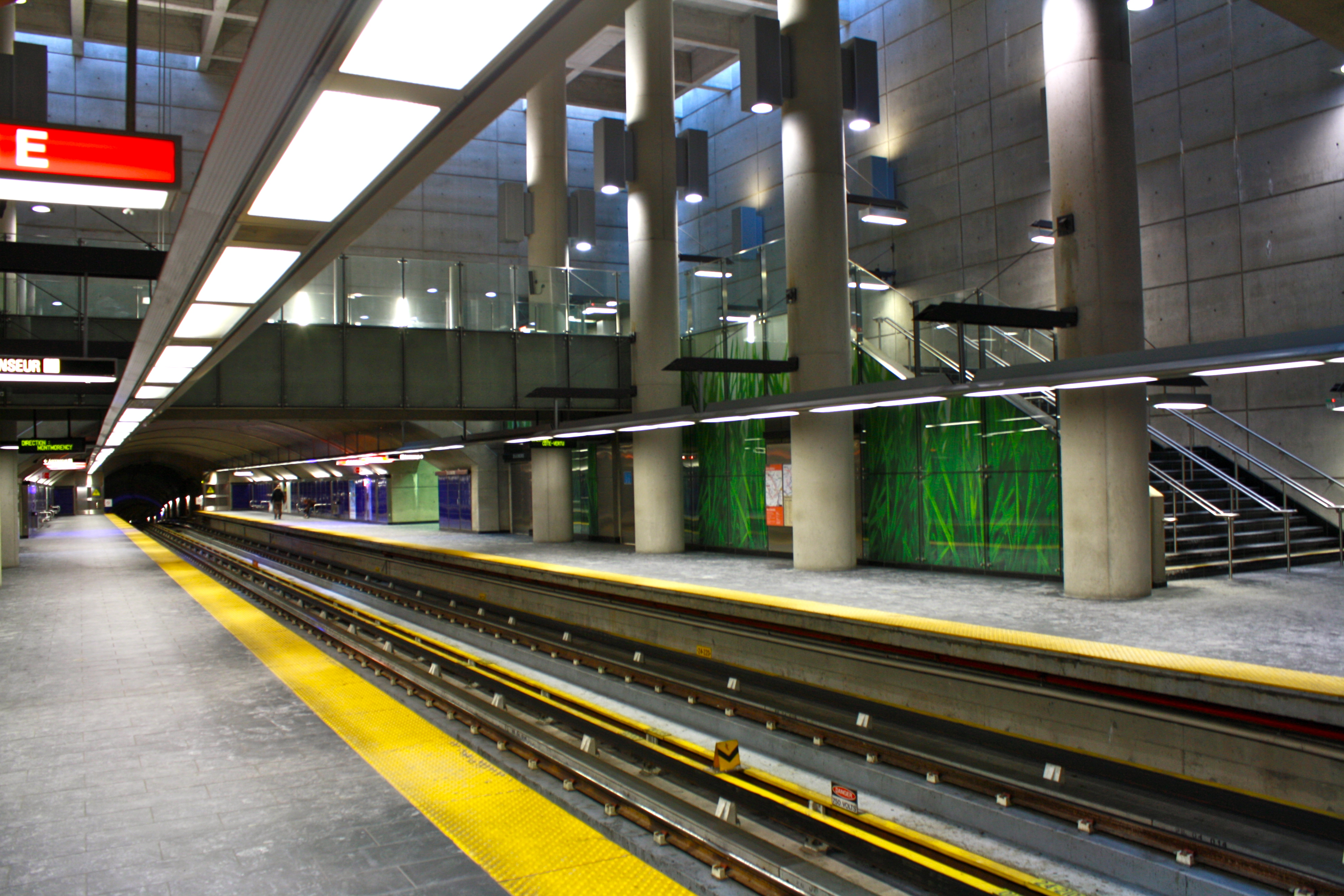

General information
- Location: 1200, Boulevard de la Concorde Ouest; Laval, Quebec H7N 5H6; Canada
- Coordinates: 45°33′39″N 73°42′35″W
- Operator: Société de transport de Montréal
- Platforms: 2 side platforms
- Tracks: 2
- Connections: Société de transport de Laval; Line 12 – Saint-Jérôme

Construction
- Depth: 15 metres (49 feet 3 inches), 25th
- Accessible: Yes
- Architect: André Marcotte

Other information
- Station code: 286
- Fare zone: ARTM: B

History
- Opened: 26 April 2007

Passengers
- 2024: 1,498,163 ▲23.97%
- Rank: 62 of 68

Services
Preceding station	Montreal Metro	Following station
Cartier toward Côte-Vertu	Orange Line	Montmorency Terminus
Location

De la Concorde station (French pronunciation: [də la kɔ̃kɔʁd]) is an intermodal transit station in Laval, Quebec, Canada. It serves the Montreal Metro's Orange Line and connects to Exo's Saint-Jérôme commuter rail line. It is located in the Laval-des-Rapides district and opened April 28, 2007, as part of Montreal Metro's extension into Laval.

== Description ==
The station is named after boulevard de la Concorde, which in turn is named for the Place de la Concorde in Paris. The entrance building is split-level, the lower providing access to the Metro station and the upper level to the train station, with the platforms continuing towards the walkway that goes under the rail bridge that crosses Boul. de la Concorde. This walkway is higher than the sidewalk. On the west side of the station, opposite the Metro station, stairs connect the sidewalk with the walkway.

== Montreal Metro ==
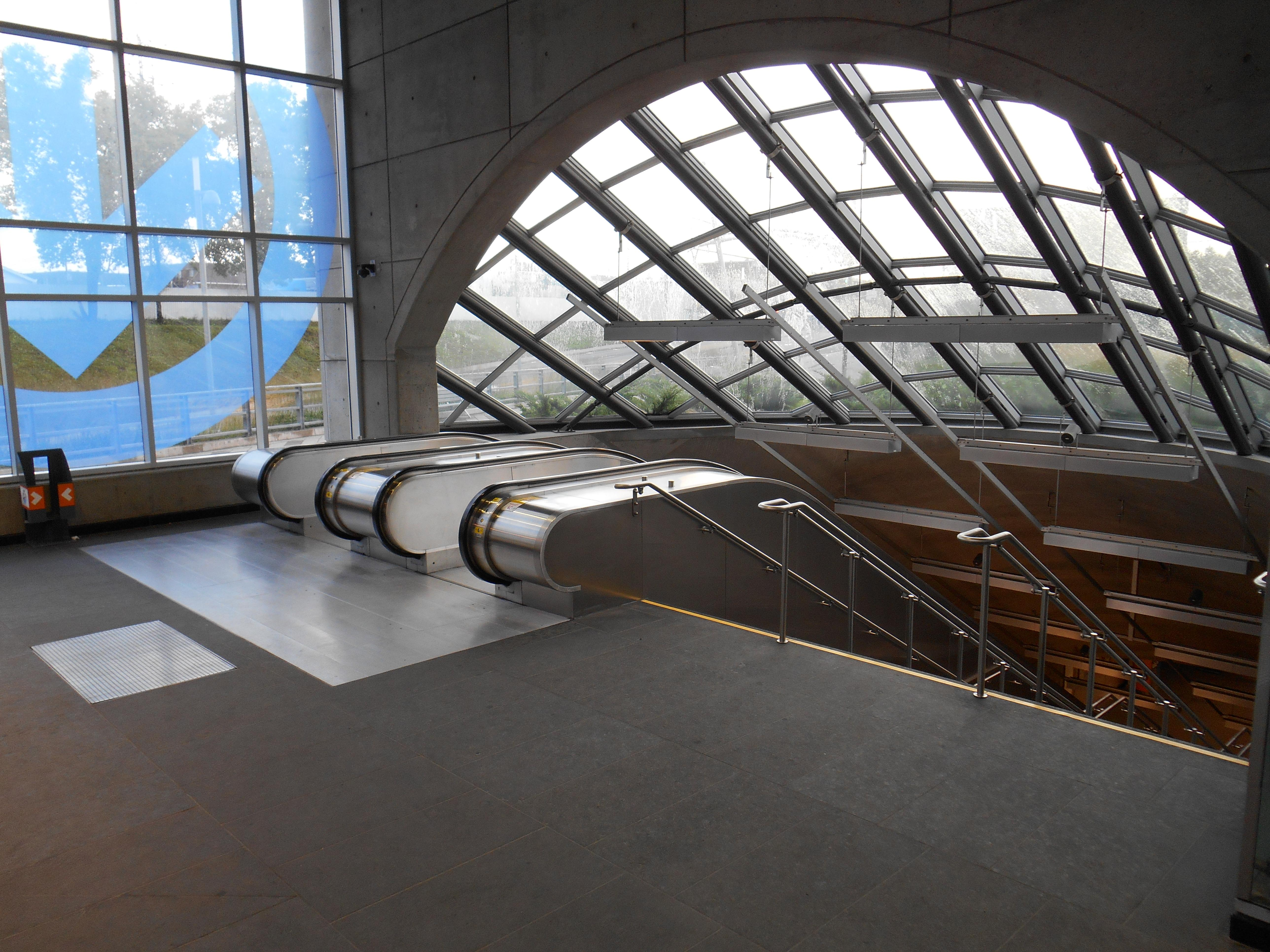
Skylight of the station

The station is a side platform station, built in tunnel with an open-pit central section in the shape of a cube. The upper surface of the cube protrudes out of the earth and is rimmed with skylights, producing a sundial-like effect as the progress of the sun changes the light within the cube. The station's decor is primarily bare concrete, metal, and steel, with the platform's ultramarine tiles and enlarged photographs of grass providing colour.

The escalator shaft from the entrance building to the ticket hall also protrudes out of the earth as a glazed cylinder reminiscent of Norman Foster's fosterito metro entrances in the Bilbao Metro. The entrance building is split-level, with one level providing access to the street and the other to the train station; its glazed front is decorated with a large Metro logo.

The train station is located at an upper level and the platforms continue onto a viaduct over Boul. de la Concorde. Also at this level is a park and ride loop and bicycle trail access.

The area to the east of the station entrance is landscaped, with benches and a terrace provided on top of the station cube. The footpath leading to the station is the site of the station's artwork, Nos allers-retours (translation: our departures and returns) by Yves Gendreau. The sculpture is a series of tangled metal tubes, in the colours of the Metro lines plus purple for the commuter trains, atop a series of poles, representing the paths taken by the users of public transit.

== Commuter rail ==
De la Concorde
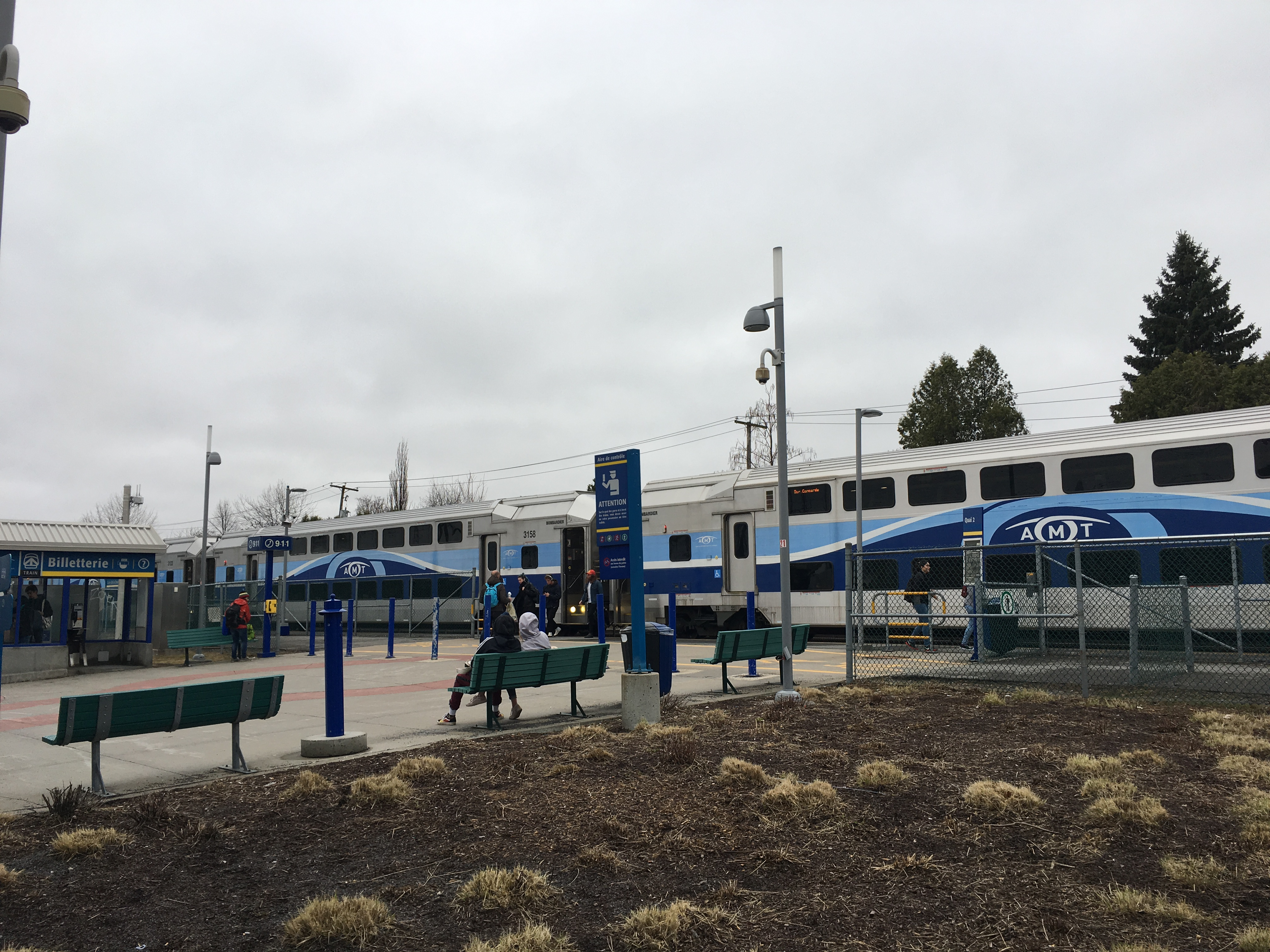

General information
- Location: 1240 Léo-Lacombe Avenue; Laval, Quebec H7N 3Y6
- Coordinates: 45°33′38″N 73°42′36″W
- Operator: Exo
- Platforms: 2 side platforms
- Tracks: 2
- Bus operators: Société de transport de Laval
- Connections: Orange Line

Construction
- Parking: 102 spaces
- Cycle facilities: 53 spaces

Other information
- Fare zone: ARTM: B

History
- Opened: 2007

Passengers
- 2019: 1,277,600 (Exo)

Services
Preceding station	Exo	Following station
Vimont toward Saint-Jérôme	Line 12 – Saint-Jérôme	Bois-de-Boulogne toward Lucien-L'Allier
Location

De la Concorde station is a commuter rail station operated by Exo in Laval, Quebec, Canada. It is served by the Saint-Jérôme line.

The station replaced Saint-Martin station, a commuter rail station that had been 1.65 km (1.03 mi) to the north, in order to be intermodal with the new Montreal Metro station, operated by the Société de transport de Montréal (STM).

== Connecting bus routes ==
Société de transport de Laval
No.	Route	Connects to	Services times / notes
2 ♿︎	Métro Montmorency - Métro Henri-Bourassa	Henri-Bourassa; Cartier; Montmorency	Late-night shuttle
33 ♿︎	Métro Montmorency - Métro Cartier	Montmorency; Cartier	Daily
37	Métro Cartier - Sainte-Rose	Cartier	Daily
42	Terminus Le Carrefour - Saint-François	Montmorency; Terminus Le Carrefour	Daily
345 ♿︎	Métro Henri-Bourassa - Gare Vimont	Henri-Bourassa; Cartier; Montmorency; Vimont	Late-night shuttle
