= Cartier station (Montreal Metro) =

Montreal Metro station

Cartier
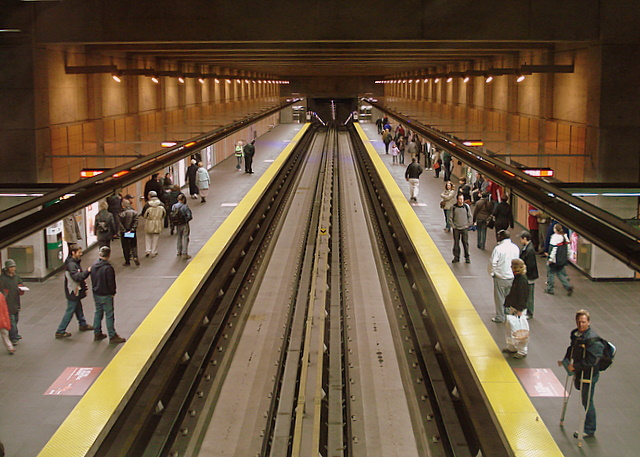

General information
- Location: 5, boulevard Cartier Ouest; Laval, Quebec H7N 0A3; Canada
- Coordinates: 45°33′37″N 73°40′55″W
- Operator: Société de transport de Montréal
- Platforms: 2 side platforms
- Tracks: 2
- Connections: Terminus Cartier

Construction
- Accessible: Yes
- Architect: Richard Fortin

Other information
- Station code: 282
- Fare zone: ARTM: B

History
- Opened: 26 April 2007

Passengers
- 2024: 2,796,107 ▲11.93%
- Rank: 35 of 68

Services
Preceding station	Montreal Metro	Following station
Henri-Bourassa toward Côte-Vertu	Orange Line	De la Concorde toward Montmorency
Location

Cartier station (French pronunciation: [kaʁtje]) is a Montreal Metro station in Laval, Quebec, Canada. It is operated by the Société de transport de Montréal (STM) and serves the Orange Line. Located in the Pont-Viau district, it is part of an extension into Laval, and opened on April 28, 2007.

== Architecture ==
It is a normal side platform station. The station's main entrance, adjoining the bus terminal, takes the form of a right triangle, with the legs parallel to the streets and the hypotenuse parallel to the tracks, thereby bringing the aboveground and underground world into relation. There is an entrance at each of the two points of the triangle, while the centre is sunken to provide access to the escalators to the ticket hall and to the tunnel to the secondary entrance. The sunken area looks out onto a sunken garden.

A second entrance on the opposite corner of Boul. des Laurentides and Boul. Cartier, to spare pedestrians from crossing the busy boulevard, was opened on May 22, 2009.

The station features two artworks. The first, L'Homme est un roseau pensant III by Jacek Jarnuszkiewicz, is a pair of tall, slender metal spires on the edge of the garden. The second, Dessins suspendus by Yvon Proulx, is installed in the secondary entrance.

== Origin of name ==
The station is named for nearby Boulevard Cartier, which in turn was named for George-Étienne Cartier, a French-Canadian statesman and Father of Confederation.

== Nearby points of interest ==
- Cartier arena (Laval-des-Rapides)
- Cartier park (Laval-des-Rapides)
- Du Marigot park (Pont-Viau)
- Laval Municipal court (Pont-Viau)
- Ahuntsic Bridge

== Terminus Cartier ==
Terminus Cartier
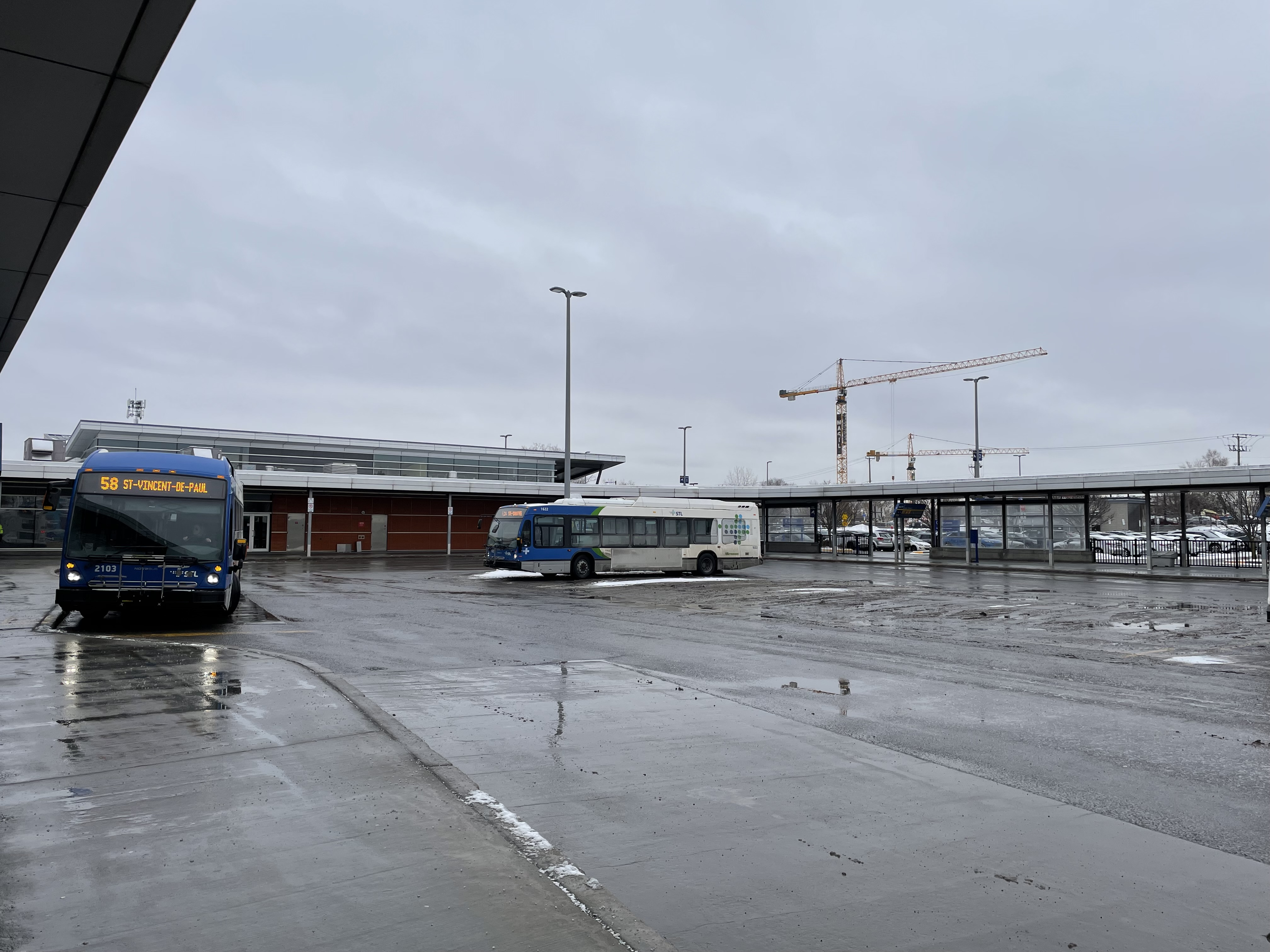

General information
- Location: 44, boul. des Laurentides, Laval
- Coordinates: 45°33′36″N 73°40′54″W
- Owner: ARTM
- Operator: Société de transport de Laval
- Bus operators: Société de transport de Laval; Exo bus services; FlixBus

Construction
- Parking: 599 park and ride spaces
- Cycle facilities: 54 places in racks

Other information
- Fare zone: ARTM: B
- Website: Terminus Cartier

Passengers
- 2016: 5,064,800 (Exo)
Location

A large bus terminus with 11 platforms and two park and ride lots (599 free spaces ) has been built above the subway station. The covered bus terminal has an Autorité régionale de transport métropolitain (ARTM) ticket counter, a heated waiting area, and electronic boards to display bus departures. In addition, a shopping concourse has been built adjacent to the bus terminal to eventually welcome shops and restaurants. A convenience store and a café are currently the only tenants.

=== Connecting bus routes ===
Société de transport de Laval
No.	Route	Connects to	Services times / notes
2 ♿︎	Métro Montmorency - Métro Henri-Bourassa	Henri-Bourassa; De La Concorde; Montmorency	Late-night shuttle
12	Pont-Viau - Métro Cartier		Daily
17 ♿︎	Métro Cartier - Auteuil		Daily
20 ♿︎	Métro Cartier - Chomedey		Daily
22	Métro Cartier - Saint-François		Daily
24 ♿︎	Métro Cartier - Sainte-Dorothée		Daily
27	Métro Cartier - Gare Vimont	Vimont	Daily
31 ♿︎	Métro Henri-Bourassa - Auteuil	Henri-Bourassa	Daily
33 ♿︎	Métro Montmorency - Métro Cartier	Montmorency; De La Concorde	Daily
37	Métro Cartier - Sainte-Rose	De La Concorde	Daily
43 ♿︎	Métro Cartier - Auteuil		Daily
48 ♿︎	Métro Cartier - Gare Vimont	Vimont; Pie-IX BRT	Daily
58	Métro Cartier - Saint-Vincent-de-Paul	Pie-IX BRT	Daily
60 ♿︎	Métro Cartier - Chomedey	Terminus Le Carrefour	Daily
63 ♿︎	Métro Cartier - Gare Sainte-Rose	Terminus Le Carrefour; Sainte-Rose	Daily
70 ♿︎	Métro Cartier - Métro Montmorency	Terminus Le Carrefour; Montmorency	Daily
73 ♿︎	Métro Cartier - Fabreville	Sainte-Rose	Daily
74	Métro Cartier - Saint-François		Daily
222	Métro Cartier - Saint-Vincent-de-Paul		Limited weekend service
322	Métro Henri-Bourassa - Duvernay	Henri-Bourassa	Late-night shuttle
345 ♿︎	Métro Henri-Bourassa - Gare Vimont	Henri-Bourassa; De La Concorde; Montmorency; Vimont	Late-night shuttle
901	Métro Cartier - Saint-François		Weekdays, peak only
Exo Terrebonne-Mascouche sector
No.	Route	Connects to	Services times / notes
512	Terrebonne (West) - Laval		Daily
Exo Laurentides sector
No.	Route	Connects to	Services times / notes
514	Sainte-Anne-des-Plaines - Laval		Weekdays, peak only

==== Intercity buses ====
Intercity buses
Company	Destinations
FlixBus	Gatineau • Ottawa
Autobus Galland	Mont-Tremblant • Mont-Laurier
Autobus Maheux	Grand-Remous • Val-d'Or • Rouyn-Noranda

== See also ==
- List of park and rides in Greater Montreal
