= Centre 2000 =

Shopping mall in Laval, Quebec, Canada

Coordinates: 45°33′35″N 73°45′8″W

Centre 2000 was an indoor shopping mall on St. Martin boulevard in the Chomedey district of Laval, Quebec, Canada.

== History ==
The mall was opened in 1973 as the first hypermarket in North America (under the name: Centre 2000: Hypermarché), the one store occupied over 80% of the entire floor space, on one side of the mall. The other side was composed of a line of small boutiques and two walkways to the parking lot. The Hypermarché store boasted 49 checkout counters and the concept was similar to that of a Costco store, with a mix of food and other goods, with warehouse shelving right in the shopping area.

In 1976 the hypermarket split into a Towers (Bonimart) and Food City, and the rest of the mall subdivided into several separate stores. By 1977 the mall had 60 stores. The mall's anchors included a Cineplex-Odeon theatre, Pinocchio's arcade, and the remnants of the original split hypermarket: Zellers and Maxi. Lamp-posts in the mall's parking lot were marked with animal pictorials.

The mall was completely vacant by the end of the 1990s and then closed. It was demolished between 2000 and 2001, excluding the adjacent (but detached) Leon's furniture store, which was heavily renovated and still remains to this day.

In early 2011, Centre 2000's parking lot and remaining foundation were demolished. The property is now part of Centropolis Laval, which is currently building on the site.

In 2012 most of the property was used to build a Walmart Supercentre, following a relocation from the nearby Centre Laval mall.
