= Société de transport de Laval =

Public transportation organization in Laval

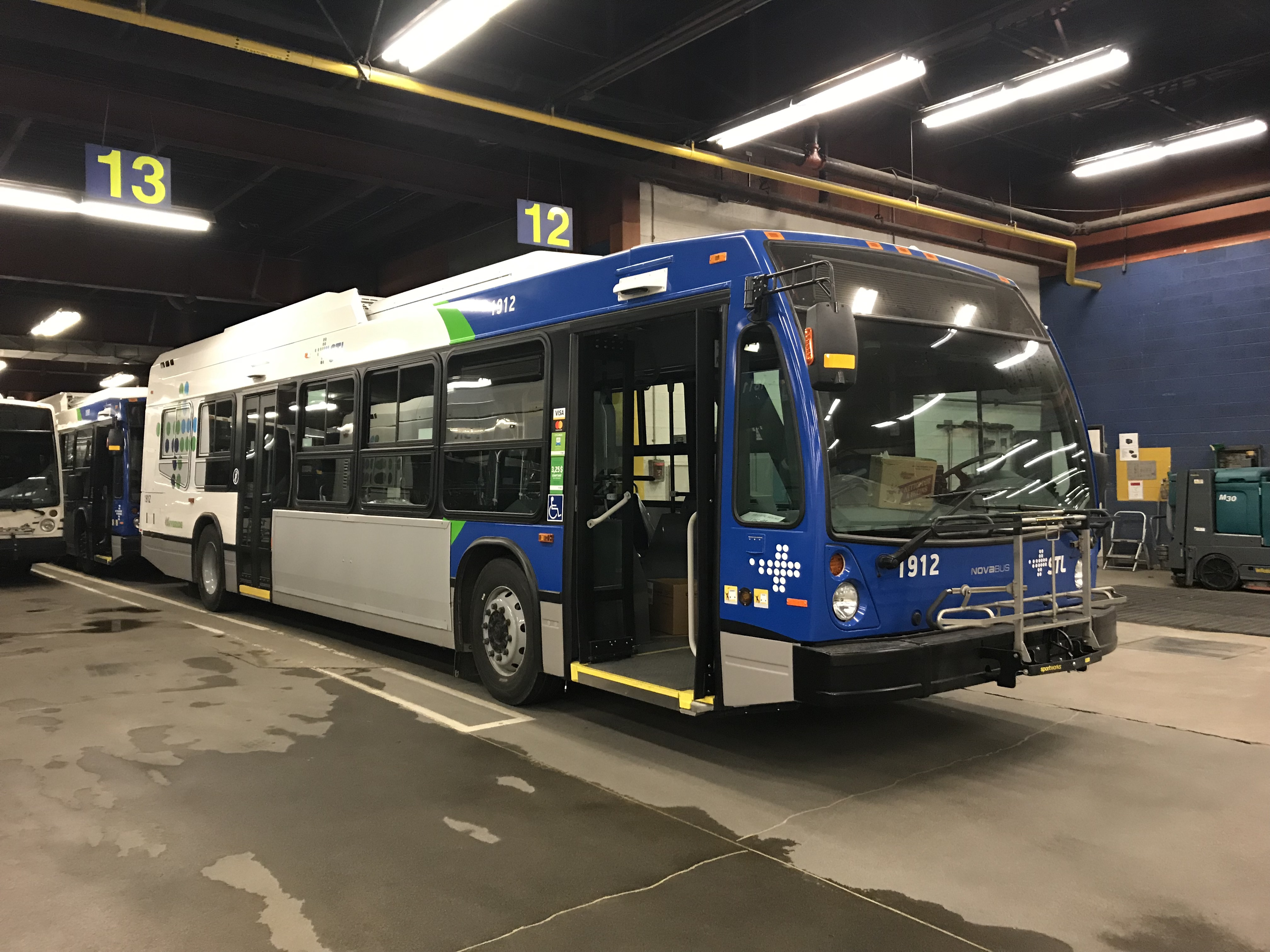
- Founded: June 1, 1971
- Headquarters: 2250 Francis-Hughes Av.
- Locale: Laval, Quebec
- Service area: Laval
- Service type: Bus service, paratransit
- Routes: 44
- Stops: 2,724
- Hubs: Le Carrefour Terminus, Cartier Terminus, Montmorency Terminus, Henri-Bourassa Terminus, Côte-Vertu Terminus
- Stations: 535 (shelters)
- Fleet: 309 buses
- Daily ridership: 18.1 million (annually, 2025)
- Fuel type: B5 Biodesel
- Chief executive: Josée Roy
- Website: English language site

Société de transport de Laval (French pronunciation: [sɔsjete də tʁɑ̃spɔʁ də laval], STL) is the public transit system in the city of Laval, Quebec, Canada.

== History ==
The STL was founded in June 1971 as the Commission de transport de la Ville de Laval (CTL) and started official operations on January 29, 1972. It later was reorganized into the Société de transport de la Ville de Laval on February 7, 1985, until changing to its current name in 2001.

In 2009 and 2010, a proposal to convert some of STL's most heavily used routes to electric trolleybuses was studied in detail, funded jointly by STL and Hydro-Québec, but in the fourth quarter of 2010, STL decided to postpone making a decision on trolleybuses until at least 2011, to allow further study of rechargeable electric buses first.

== Routes ==
Serving the growing suburban areas of Laval and the north of Montreal, the STL runs 51 routes. Most bus routes end at metro stations Cartier or Montmorency of the Orange Line. All buses go to at least one metro station, with the exception of lines 66, 203, 244, 251 and 255. Lines 203, 244, 251 and 255 end at a REM station instead of a metro station. There are four night routes on the STL, route 2, 322, 335 and 345. In addition some of the daytime bus routes go up to 3:30 a.m. The STL also operates 6 collective taxi routes (T03 – along Saulnier Street, T07 – Rangs Haut-St-François & St-Elzéar sectors, T10 – along av. des Perron, T11 – in Fabreville, T12 – in NW Chomedey and T14 from Laval West to Saint Eustache).

=== Routes list ===
Société de transport de Laval
No.	Route	Connects to	Services times / notes
2 ♿︎	Métro Montmorency	Henri-Bourassa; Cartier; Montmorency; De La Concorde	Late-night shuttle, no Sunday service
2 ♿︎	Métro Henri-Bourassa	Henri-Bourassa; Cartier; Montmorency; De La Concorde	Late-night shuttle, no Sunday service
12	Pont-Viau	Cartier	Daily
12	Métro Cartier	Cartier	Daily
16 ♿︎	Métro Montmorency	Montmorency	Weekdays, peak only
16 ♿︎	Laval-des-Rapides / Armand-Frappier	Montmorency	Weekdays, peak only
17 ♿︎	Métro Cartier	Cartier	Daily
17 ♿︎	Auteuil	Cartier	Daily
20 ♿︎	Métro Cartier	Cartier	Daily
20 ♿︎	Chomedey	Cartier	Daily
22	Métro Cartier	Cartier	Daily
22	Saint-François	Cartier	Daily
24 ♿︎	Métro Cartier	Cartier	Daily
24 ♿︎	Sainte-Dorothée	Cartier	Daily
26	Métro Montmorency	Montmorency; Sainte-Dorothée	Daily
26	Station Sainte-Dorothée	Montmorency; Sainte-Dorothée	Daily
27	Métro Cartier	Cartier; Vimont	Daily
27	Gare Vimont	Cartier; Vimont	Daily
31 ♿︎	Métro Henri-Bourassa	Henri-Bourassa; Cartier	Daily
31 ♿︎	Auteuil	Henri-Bourassa; Cartier	Daily
33 ♿︎	Métro Montmorency	Montmorency; Cartier; De La Concorde	Daily
33 ♿︎	Métro Cartier	Montmorency; Cartier; De La Concorde	Daily
36	Métro Montmorency	Montmorency	Weekdays, peak only
36	Chomedey	Montmorency	Weekdays, peak only
37	Métro Cartier	Cartier; De La Concorde	Daily
37	Sainte-Rose	Cartier; De La Concorde	Daily
39 ♿︎	Terminus Le Carrefour	Montmorency; Terminus Le Carrefour	Daily
39 ♿︎	Auteuil	Montmorency; Terminus Le Carrefour	Daily
40 ♿︎	Métro Montmorency	Montmorency	Daily
40 ♿︎	Chomedey	Montmorency	Daily
42	Terminus Le Carrefour	Montmorency; De La Concorde; Terminus Le Carrefour	Daily
42	Saint-François	Montmorency; De La Concorde; Terminus Le Carrefour	Daily
43 ♿︎	Métro Cartier	Cartier	Daily
43 ♿︎	Auteuil	Cartier	Daily
45 ♿︎	Métro Montmorency	Montmorency; Vimont	Daily
45 ♿︎	Auteuil	Montmorency; Vimont	Daily
46 ♿︎	Métro Montmorency	Montmorency	Daily
46 ♿︎	Laval-Ouest	Montmorency	Daily
48 ♿︎	Métro Cartier	Cartier; Vimont; Pie-IX BRT	Daily
48 ♿︎	Gare Vimont	Cartier; Vimont; Pie-IX BRT	Daily
50 ♿︎	Terminus Le Carrefour	Montmorency; Pie-IX BRT; Terminus Le Carrefour	Daily
50 ♿︎	Saint-Vincent-de-Paul	Montmorency; Pie-IX BRT; Terminus Le Carrefour	Daily
52	Métro Henri-Bourassa	Henri-Bourassa; Pie-IX BRT	Daily
52	Saint-François	Henri-Bourassa; Pie-IX BRT	Daily
55	Métro Henri-Bourassa	Henri-Bourassa; Du Ruisseau; Bois-de-Boulogne	Weekdays only
55	Laval-Ouest	Henri-Bourassa; Du Ruisseau; Bois-de-Boulogne	Weekdays only
56	Métro Montmorency	Montmorency; Terminus Le Carrefour	Daily
56	Sainte-Dorothée	Montmorency; Terminus Le Carrefour	Daily
58	Métro Cartier	Cartier; Pie-IX BRT	Daily
58	Saint-Vincent-de-Paul	Cartier; Pie-IX BRT	Daily
60 ♿︎	Métro Cartier	Cartier; Terminus Le Carrefour	Daily
60 ♿︎	Chomedey	Cartier; Terminus Le Carrefour	Daily
61	Métro Montmorency	Montmorency; Terminus Le Carrefour	Daily
61	Fabreville	Montmorency; Terminus Le Carrefour	Daily
63 ♿︎	Métro Cartier	Cartier; Sainte-Rose; Terminus Le Carrefour; Montmorency	Daily
63 ♿︎	Gare Sainte-Rose	Cartier; Sainte-Rose; Terminus Le Carrefour; Montmorency	Daily
65	Métro Montmorency	Montmorency; Sainte-Rose	Daily
65	Gare Sainte-Rose	Montmorency; Sainte-Rose	Daily
66 ♿︎	Terminus Le Carrefour	Terminus Le Carrefour	Daily
66 ♿︎	Sainte-Dorothée	Terminus Le Carrefour	Daily
70 ♿︎	Métro Cartier	Montmorency; Cartier; Terminus Le Carrefour	Daily
70 ♿︎	Métro Montmorency	Montmorency; Cartier; Terminus Le Carrefour	Daily
73 ♿︎	Métro Cartier	Cartier; Sainte-Rose	Daily
73 ♿︎	Fabreville	Cartier; Sainte-Rose	Daily
74	Métro Cartier	Cartier	Daily
74	Saint-François	Cartier	Daily
76	Métro Montmorency	Montmorency; Sainte-Dorothée	Daily
76	Station Sainte-Dorothée	Montmorency; Sainte-Dorothée	Daily
144	Métro Côte-Vertu	Côte-Vertu; Bois-Franc	Daily
144	Sainte-Dorothée	Côte-Vertu; Bois-Franc	Daily
151	Métro Côte-Vertu	Côte-Vertu; Bois-Franc	Daily
151	Sainte-Rose	Côte-Vertu; Bois-Franc	Daily
203	Fabreville	Sainte-Dorothée	Daily
203	Station Sainte-Dorothée	Sainte-Dorothée	Daily
222	Métro Cartier	Cartier	Limited weekend service
222	Saint-Vincent-de-Paul	Cartier	Limited weekend service
226	Métro Montmorency	Montmorency	Weekdays, peak only
226	Sainte-Dorothée	Montmorency	Weekdays, peak only
244	Station Bois-Franc	Bois-Franc	Weekdays, peak only
244	Sainte-Dorothée	Bois-Franc	Weekdays, peak only
251	Station Bois-Franc	Bois-Franc	Weekdays, peak only
251	Sainte-Rose	Bois-Franc	Weekdays, peak only
252	Métro Henri-Bourassa	Henri-Bourassa; Pie-IX BRT	Weekdays, peak only
252	Saint-François	Henri-Bourassa; Pie-IX BRT	Weekdays, peak only
255	Station Bois-Franc	Bois-Franc	Daily, weekdays early mornings and late evenings only
255	Laval-Ouest	Bois-Franc	Daily, weekdays early mornings and late evenings only
313	Métro Côte-Vertu	Côte-Vertu	Service for Structube employees mostly
313	Chomedey	Côte-Vertu	Service for Structube employees mostly
322	Métro Henri-Bourassa	Henri-Bourassa; Cartier	Late-night shuttle
322	Duvernay	Henri-Bourassa; Cartier	Late-night shuttle
335	Métro Henri-Bourassa	Henri-Bourassa	Daily
335	Vimont	Henri-Bourassa	Daily
345 ♿︎	Métro Henri-Bourassa	Henri-Bourassa; Cartier; Montmorency; De La Concorde; Vimont	Late-night shuttle
345 ♿︎	Gare Vimont	Henri-Bourassa; Cartier; Montmorency; De La Concorde; Vimont	Late-night shuttle
713	Sainte-Dorothée - Métro Côte-Vertu	Côte-Vertu; Bois-Franc; Sainte-Dorothée	Weekday-only regular service
713	Sainte-Dorothée – Bois-Franc – Côte-Vertu	Côte-Vertu; Bois-Franc; Île-Bigras; Sainte-Dorothée	Used in case of a service disruption on the REM
714	Deux-Montagnes – Côte-Vertu	Côte-Vertu; Deux-Montagnes	Used in case of a service disruption on the REM
715	Deux-Montagnes – Bois-Franc	Bois-Franc; Deux-Montagnes	Used in case of a service disruption on the REM
716	Deux-Montagnes – Grand-Moulin – Sainte-Dorothée	Deux-Montagnes; Grand-Moulin; Sainte-Dorothée	Used in case of a service disruption on the REM
901	Métro Cartier	Cartier	Weekdays, peak only
901	Saint-François	Cartier	Weekdays, peak only
903	Métro Montmorency	Montmorency; Sainte-Dorothée; Terminus Le Carrefour	Daily, during daytime hours
903	Station Sainte-Dorothée	Montmorency; Sainte-Dorothée; Terminus Le Carrefour	Daily, during daytime hours
925	Métro Radisson	Radisson	Weekdays, peak only
925	Saint-François	Radisson	Weekdays, peak only

=== Taxi routes ===
Société de transport de Laval: Taxis collectifs
No.	Route	Connects to	Services times / notes
T01	de la Concorde Boulevard – Rue Gaumont	Pie-IX BRT	Daily / On-request service
T02	de la Concorde Boulevard – Rue Gaumont	Pie-IX BRT	Weekdays, peak only
T03	des Laurentides Boulevard – Plastiques Balcan		Daily
T06	Saint-Martin Boulevard – A-440		Weekdays, peak only
T07	René-Laennaec Boulevard – Montée Sainte-François		Daily / On-request service
T10	des Laurentides Boulevard – des Perron Avenue		Weekdays only / On-request service
T11	Saint-Elzéar – Louis-B.-Mayer		Weekdays, peak only
T19	Duchesneau – Marcel-Villeneuve		Daily / On-request service
T23	Le Carrefour – Frégault	Terminus Le Carrefour	Weekdays only / On-request service
T29	Notre-Dame Boulevard – Rue Étienne-Lavoie		Weekdays only / On-request service
T31	Secteur Louis-B.-Mayer/Saint-Elzéar		Weekdays only / On-demand service
T36	Secteur John-Molson/voie de desserte sud A440		Daily / On-demand service
T38	Secteur Étienne-Lenoir/montée Champagne/rang Saint-Antoine		Daily / On-demand service

== Fares ==
As of July 2023, a single fare is $3.75. The Opus card is accepted, and can be used for single fares and passes. Travel on the Metro, even within Laval, requires payment of another fare to the STM. Between June 1 to Labour Day, a reduced fare of $1 (as of August 2020) is offered on Laval buses on days after a smog advisory is issued by Environment Canada.

== Metro ==
The Montreal Metro is extended into Laval since 2007, and connects with STL at three stations:

- Cartier (Nearby intersections: Cartier Blvd/Laurentides Blvd, Cartier Blvd/Major St): 21 routes, plus one night route
- De la Concorde (Nearby intersections: Concorde Blvd/Ampere Ave, Concorde Blvd/Laval Blvd): 3 routes, plus one night route
- Montmorency (Nearby intersections: Jacques-Tétrault St/Lucien-Paiement St, Jacques-Tétrault St/De l'Avenir Blvd): 15 routes, plus one night route

== Commuter rail ==
STL also connects with Exo commuter rail at:

=== Saint-Jérôme line ===
- Bois-de-Boulogne (1 route)
- De la Concorde intermodal station (4 routes, including one night route)
- Vimont (2 routes)
- Sainte-Rose (3 routes)

== REM ==
STL also connects with the REM at:

=== Deux-Montagnes branch ===
- Du Ruisseau in Montreal. (1 route)
- Bois-Franc in Montreal. (4 routes)
- Sainte-Dorothée (4 routes, including express 903)

== Fleet ==
- Nova Bus LFS
- New Flyer (demo)

denotes Wheelchair

=== Active fleet systems ===
Societe de transport de Laval current fleet
Photo	Fleet numbers	Year	Manufacturer	Model	Notes	Lengths
	0601-0612; 0701-0710; 0801-0817; 0901-0924	2005-2009	Nova Bus	LFS 2nd Generation	0811 retired due to a fire.	40" (12.19m)
	1001-1014; 1101-1120; 1201-1220; 1221-1228	2010-2012	Nova Bus	LFS 3rd Generation		40" (12.19m)
	1301-1313	2013	Nova Bus	LFS 4th Generation	New rear in 2013	40" (12.19m)
	1401-1419; 1501-1520; 1601-1628; 1701-1722; 1801-1822; 1901-1923; 2000-2018; 2101-2128; 2201-2215; 2401-2408	2014-2024	Nova Bus	LFS 4th Generation Hybrid	New driver window in 2019 (1901-1923); 1818 is retired due to an accident.	40" (12.19m)
	2052-2060	2020	New Flyer Industries	XE40	New Flyer announced 10 XE40 to STL; Contract awarded approved by the city in August 2018.; Canadian-based New Flyer Industries Canada ULC has received the contract to manufacture 10 battery-electric buses for the STL, for summer 2020 delivery.	40" (12.19m)
	2501-2513	2025	Nova Bus	LFS-e+	New seating arrangement	40" (12.19m)

Demonstrators fleet system roster
Fleet numbers	Photo	Years	Manufacturer	Model	Notes	Length
1199 (7777)		2012	Design Line	Eco-Smart I Olymbus "42"	Original numbered 1199, 1299 and 151212. Delivered to Laval in August 2011.	40 ft (12 m)
2051		2019	New Flyer	XE40	Delivered to Laval in August 2019.	40 ft (12 m)

Retired fleet systems

Fleet numbers	Year	Photo	Manufacturer	Model	Out of service dates	Notes	Length
5801-5805	1987		Motor Coach Industries	TC40-102N	2006		40" (12.19m)
5806-5850	1988		Motor Coach Industries	TC40-102N	2009/08		40" (12.19m)
5901-5925	1989		Motor Coach Industries	TC40-102N	2009/03		40" (12.19m)
6001-6020	1990		Motor Coach Industries	TC40-102N	2012		40" (12.19m)
6101-6115	1991		Motor Coach Industries	TC40-102N	2015/09		40" (12.19m)
6201-6215	1992		Motor Coach Industries	TC40-102N	2015/09		40" (12.19m)
6401-6410	1994		Nova Bus	TC40-102N	2015/09		40" (12.19m)
6500-6510	1995		Nova Bus	TC40-102N	2015/09		40" (12.19m)
9601-9605	1996		Nova Bus	LFS 1st Generation	2018/04		40" (12.19m)
9701-9715	1996		Nova Bus	LFS 1st Generation	2018/07		40" (12.19m)
9801-9815	1998		Nova Bus	LFS 1st Generation	2018/07		40" (12.19m)
0001-0014	2000		Nova Bus	LFS 1st Generation	2021/04		40" (12.19m)
0101-0124	2001		Nova Bus	LFS 2nd Generation	2021/06		40" (12.19m)
0201-0212	2002		Nova Bus	LFS 2nd Generation	2021/06		40" (12.19m)
0301-0314	2003		Nova Bus	LFS 2nd Generation	2023/02		40" (12.19m)
0401-0414, 0501-0512	2004-2005		Nova Bus	LFS 2nd Generation	2024/10		40" (12.19m)

== Proposed trolleybus system ==
In conjunction with Hydro-Québec and the provincial government, STL is considering the idea of constructing a trolleybus system in Laval. A feasibility study began in spring 2009 and was completed in autumn 2010. Proponents of the idea, including Laval Mayor Gilles Vaillancourt, have said that replacing diesel buses with trolleybuses would bring a significant reduction in harmful pollutants but would be far less costly than a tramway (streetcar) alternative being favoured by Montreal and also be less disruptive to existing streets.

In discussing the Laval study, some provincial officials indicated they would like to see transport agencies in other major Quebec cities also consider installing trolleybus networks. On completion of the study, the Laval transit authority decided to experiment with rechargeable battery-powered buses before making a decision on whether to proceed with trolleybuses. Among the points noted in the study's findings were that installing a trolleybus system would require a significant initial capital investment in infrastructure, but that trolleybuses are a technology known to be able to operate reliably in harsh winter temperatures, and it is uncertain whether other types of electric buses would be able to do so.

== See also ==
- Laval daycare bus crash
