= Marie-Curie station =

Planned REM station in Montreal, Quebec, Canada

Marie-Curie

General information
- Location: Alfred Nobel Boulevard & Albert Einstein Street; Montreal, Quebec; Canada
- Coordinates: 45°28′46″N 73°45′36″W
- Operator: Pulsar (AtkinsRéalis and Alstom)
- Platforms: 2 side platforms
- Tracks: 2
- Connections: STM bus; STM taxibus

Construction
- Structure type: Underground
- Depth: 12 m (39 ft)
- Cycle facilities: 20 rack spaces
- Accessible: Yes

Other information
- Station code: TEC

History
- Opening: 2027; 1 year's time

Future services
Preceding station	REM	Following station
Airport Terminus	Réseau express métropolitain (opens 2027)	Bois-Franc toward Brossard
Location

Marie-Curie (French: [maʁikyʁi]; known as Technoparc during development) is an under-construction underground Réseau express métropolitain (REM) station in the borough of Saint-Laurent in Montreal, Quebec, Canada. Scheduled to open in 2027, it is planned to be operated by CDPQ Infra and to serve the Airport branch of the REM.

It will serve Technoparc Montreal, Canada's first technology and science park, near Montréal–Trudeau International Airport. The station is named after Avenue Marie-Curie inside Technoparc, which is named after Nobel laureate Marie Curie.
