= Griffintown–Bernard-Landry station =

Railway station in Montreal, Quebec, Canada

Griffintown–Bernard-Landry
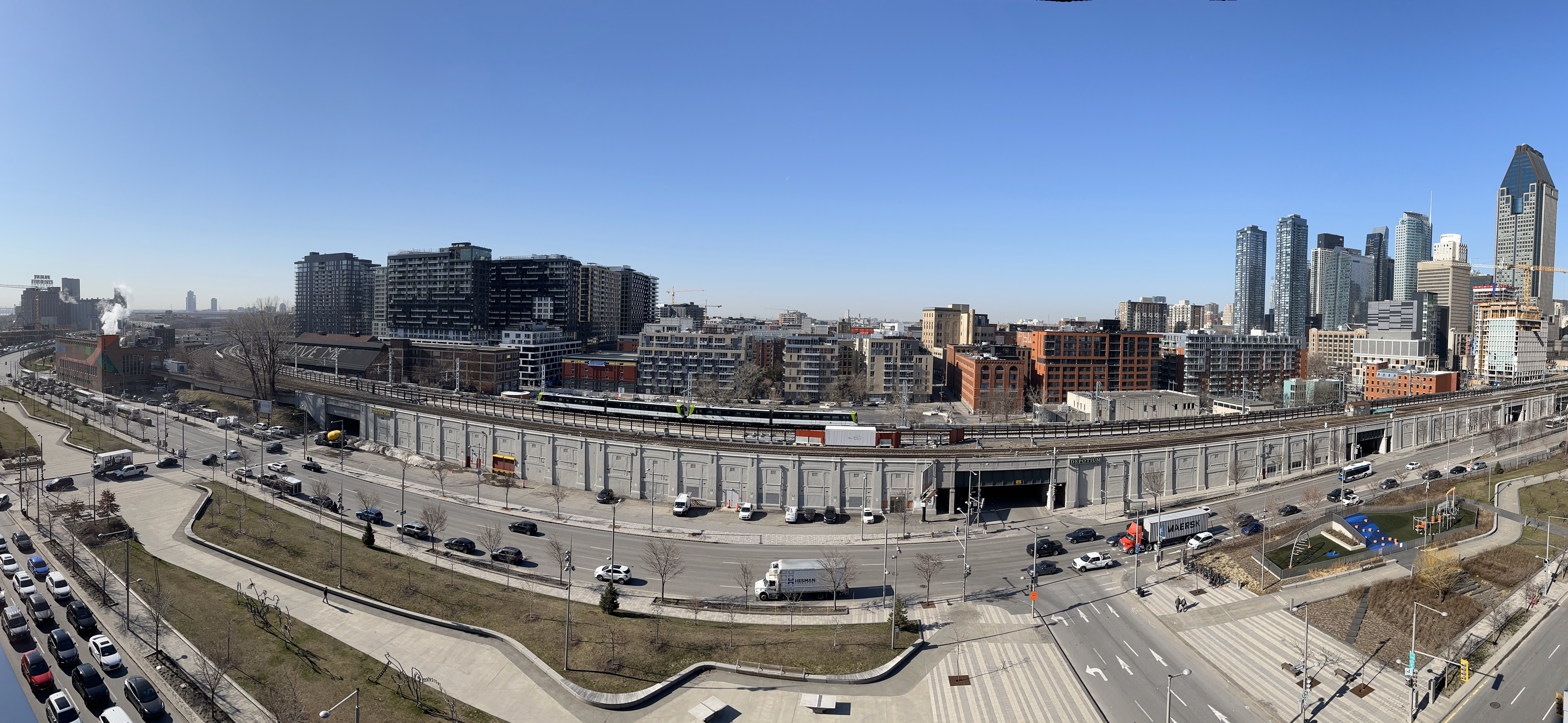
- Future location of Griffintown–Bernard-Landry station

General information
- Location: Dalhousie Street; Montreal, Quebec; Canada
- Coordinates: 45°29′47″N 73°33′32″W
- Operator: CDPQ Infra
- Platforms: 2 side platforms
- Tracks: 2

Construction
- Structure type: Elevated
- Accessible: Yes

Other information
- Station code: GRF

History
- Opening: 2030

Future services
Preceding station	REM	Following station
Central Station toward Deux-Montagnes, Anse-à-l'Orme or Airport	Réseau express métropolitain	Bridge–Bonaventure (planned) toward Brossard
Track layout
Location

Griffintown–Bernard-Landry station is a planned infill station on the Réseau express métropolitain (REM) in the borough of Le Sud-Ouest in Montreal, Quebec, Canada. It will be operated by CDPQ Infra and serve as a station on the South Shore branch of the REM.

The station was not built at the same time as the adjacent stations on the line, after the station location was moved from Peel Basin to the Central Station viaduct in 2020, delaying construction. As of 2026, the estimated opening date of the station is 2030.

== History ==
When the REM was initially proposed in April 2016, two "potential station locations" south of Gare Centrale were listed as Bridge-Wellington and Du Havre. In November 2016, locations of downtown stations were confirmed, with Bassin Peel station to be located under the Peel Basin of the Lachine Canal, near the site of the former Goose Village neighbourhood. The station was planned to be built underground, with one exit leading to Griffintown and the other to Pointe-Saint-Charles. The local community requested that the station name reflect the Irish heritage of the area.

There was speculation that the Peel Basin would serve as the future site for a baseball stadium serving as a home for a Major League Baseball team in Montreal. On February 12, 2019, the group seeking the return of an MLB team to Montreal, led by Stephen Bronfman, registered Pierre Boivin, the former president of the Montreal Canadiens, as a lobbyist to negotiate the sale of the Peel Basin to build a stadium. The land is currently under the control of the Canada Lands Company, a Federal Crown Corporation.

=== Relocation to Griffintown and naming controversy ===
In November 2019, Montreal Mayor Valérie Plante first expressed a desire to name the station after the late Premier of Quebec, Bernard Landry, due to his involvement as Quebec's Minister of Finance, in the redevelopment of the area adjacent to Griffintown and the western portion of Old Montreal as the Cité du Multimédia, a business cluster for Information Technology companies. This sparked a backlash from the city's Irish community.

On June 23, 2020, it was announced that the station would be relocated onto the Central Station train viaduct facing Dalhousie Street, between William Street and Ottawa Street in Griffintown. It was also announced that the station would be named Griffintown–Bernard-Landry as a compromise but the name still proved controversial.

=== Construction ===
Because the station was planned after the start of construction of the rest of the REM, the station was not built at the same time as the adjacent stations on the line. In a 2023 interview with the Montreal Gazette, a spokesperson for the REM explained that a "study analyzing the best way to build the station [was] nearly done and [would] be made public by the end of the year." Local politicians and transit advocates noted their annoyance that the station was not opened with the other REM stations in August 2023.

In January 2024, La Presse reported that construction would not begin until 2027 and that studies were being undertaken by CDPQ Infra on how to construct the station while the rest of the line is in operation. In August 2024, La Presse reported that CDPQ Infra refused to confirm that the station would be completed by 2027, but that construction could take place while the REM is in operation. CDPQ Infra also noted that an additional station (Bridge-Bonaventure, which would be located south of the Lachine Canal) was technically feasible.

In June 2026, CDPQ Infra began planning work on the station. Construction is scheduled to begin in 2028 and be completed in 2030.
