= YUL–Aéroport-Montréal–Trudeau station =

Planned REM station in Dorval, Quebec, Canada

YUL–Aéroport-Montréal–Trudeau

General information
- Location: Montréal–Trudeau International Airport; Dorval, Quebec; Canada
- Coordinates: 45.4571°N 73.7496°W (approx.)
- Owner: Aéroports de Montréal
- Operator: Pulsar (AtkinsRéalis and Alstom)
- Platforms: 2 side platforms
- Tracks: 2 (passing loop)

Construction
- Structure type: Underground
- Depth: 35 metres (115 ft)
- Accessible: Yes

Other information
- Station code: AER

History
- Opening: 2027

Future services
Preceding station	REM	Following station
Terminus	Réseau express métropolitain (opens 2027)	Marie-Curie toward Brossard
Track layout
Location

YUL–Aéroport-Montréal–Trudeau station is an under-construction Réseau express métropolitain (REM) station in the city of Dorval, Quebec, Canada, on the grounds of Montréal–Trudeau International Airport (YUL).

Plans for a station at the airport stretch back decades. When the airport was expanded in 2009, adding Pier C and a Marriott Hotel, a concrete structure was built under the hotel tower to accommodate a future train station. However, during the planning for the REM, CDPQ Infra decided not to use the station box because accessing it from the north would require risky drilling under the foundation of the airport's air traffic control tower.

To reach the airport, trains will begin to head underground just north of Marie-Curie station, located along Boulevard Alfred Nobel in the Technoparc Montreal area. From there, trains will travel in a single-track tunnel 3.5 kilometres (2.2 mi) under the Éco-Campus Hubert Reeves wetlands, runway 6L/24R, before reaching a double-tracked station located 35 metres (115 ft) below the airport's parking garage.

The station is being built by Aéroports de Montréal. It is planned to be operated by CDPQ Infra and to serve as a terminal station on the Airport branch of the REM. The station is scheduled to open in 2027.
