= Réseau express métropolitain =

Rapid transit system in Greater Montreal, Canada

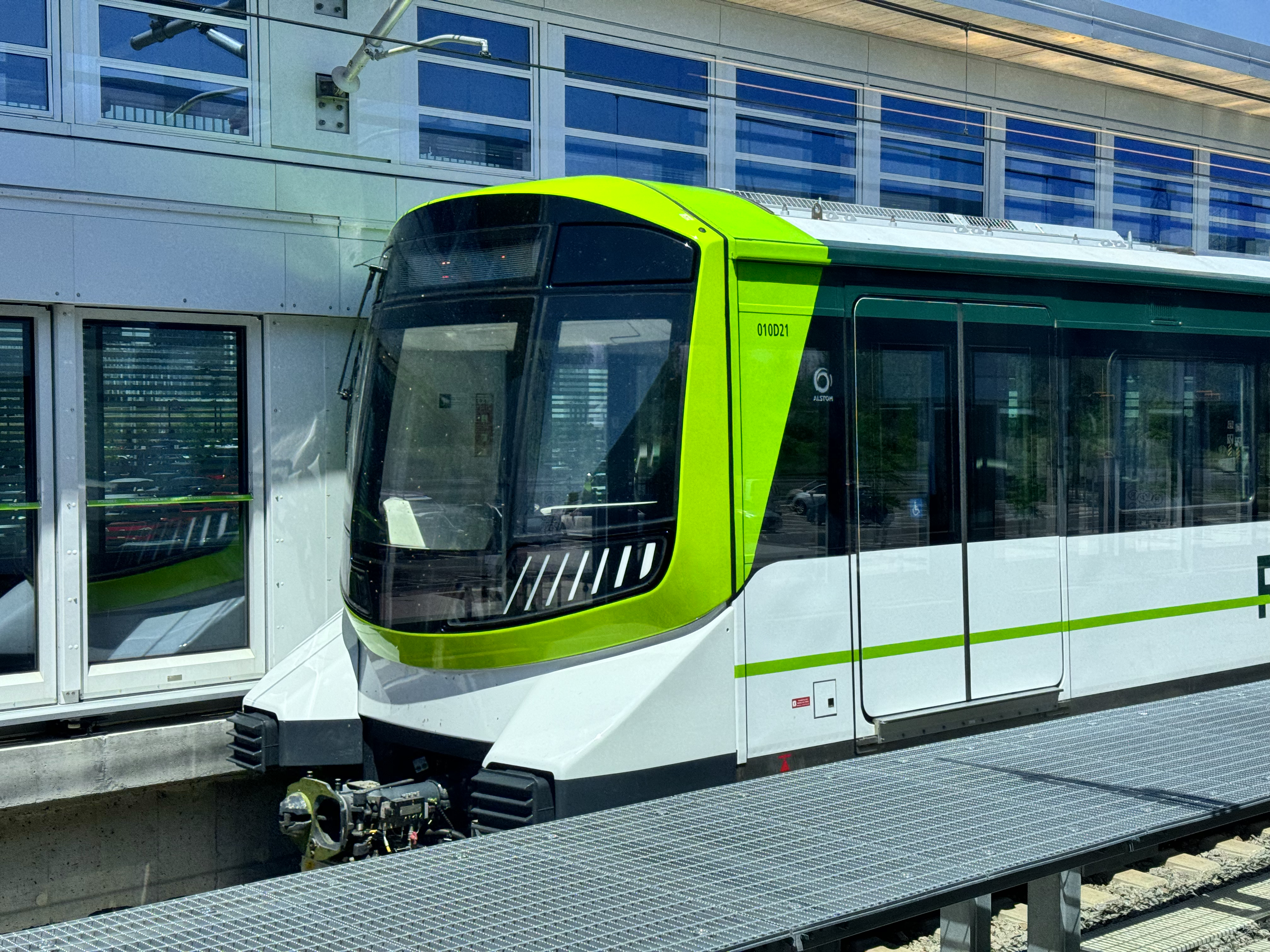
- A REM train at Brossard station

Overview
- Owner: CDPQ Infra
- Locale: Greater Montreal, Quebec
- Transit type: Light metro
- Number of lines: 1 (3 branches (Note: While the network's operator occasionally refers to the A1 or Brossard "branch" as such, the latter constitutes the trunk of the network, and is therefore not counted here as a branch.))
- Number of stations: 23 (2 under construction)
- Daily ridership: 190,000 (projected, complete); 130,000 (September 2026, A1 + A3 + A4)
- Website: rem.info/en

Operation
- Began operation: 31 July 2023; 3 years ago
- Operator: Pulsar (formerly known as Groupe PMM) (Note: Jointly controlled by Alstom and AtkinsRéalis.)
- Character: elevated: 21.5 km (13.4 mi); underground: ~8.6 km (5.3 mi) (Note: The length of the Mount Royal Tunnel is ~5.0 km, while the future tunnel portion of the A2 branch is 3.6 km.); at-grade: ~36.9 km (22.9 mi)
- Rolling stock: Alstom Metropolis Saint-Laurent
- Number of vehicles: 212 cars
- Train length: 4 cars; 2 cars off peak

Technical
- System length: 64 km (40 mi); 67 km (42 mi) (final phase)
- Track gauge: 1,435 mm (4 ft 8 1/2 in) standard gauge
- Electrification: Overhead line, 1,500 V DC
- Top speed: 100 km/h (62 mph)
System map
in operation future
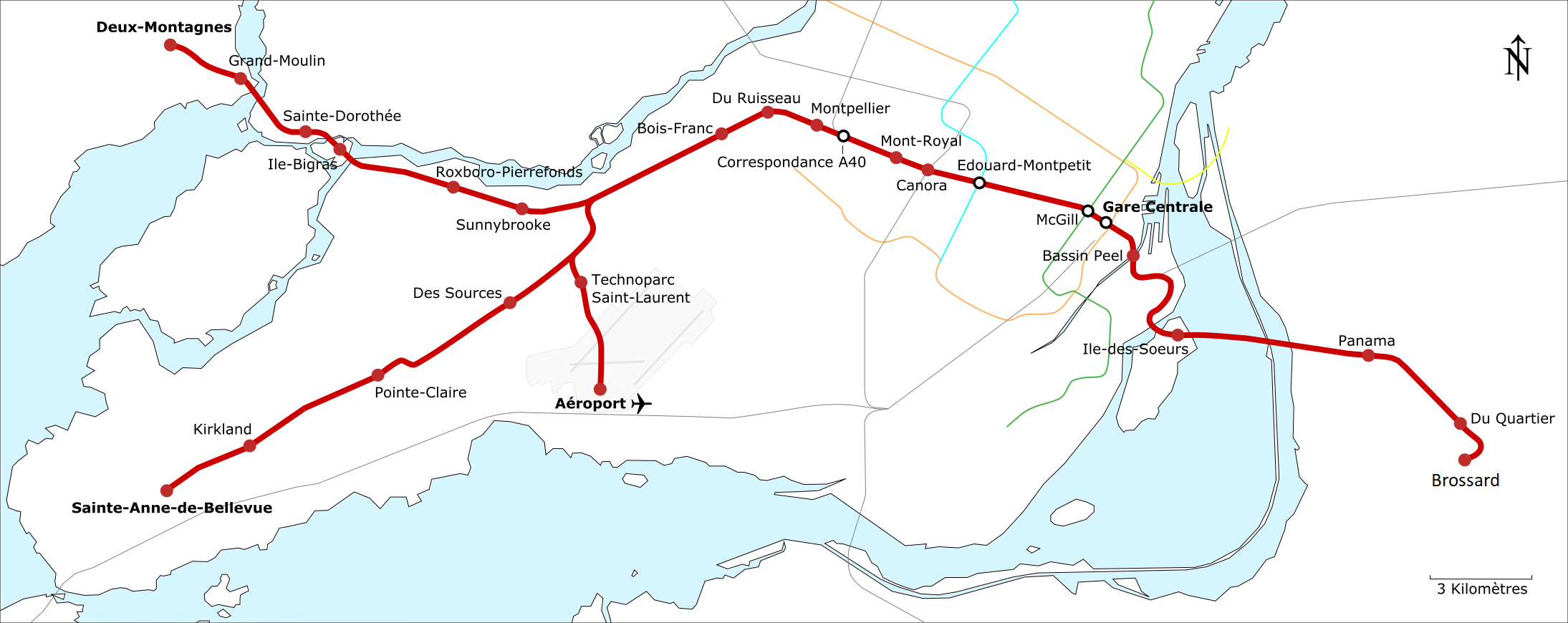

The Réseau express métropolitain (REM, French: [ʁezo ekspʁɛs metʁɔpɔlitɛ̃], lit. 'Metropolitan Express Network') is a light metro rapid transit system in Greater Montreal, Quebec, Canada. As of May 2026, it consists of 23 stations spanning the 64 kilometres (40 mi) of its A1, A3, and A4 branches, connecting Downtown Montreal with the suburb of Brossard and the northwestern Montreal suburbs. The A2 branch to the Montréal–Trudeau International Airport will open in 2027. A portion of the route was taken over from the Exo commuter rail Deux-Montagnes line and has been converted to light metro standards.

The 67-kilometre (42 mi) driverless metro system is projected to cost CA$8.34 billion. It is independent of, but connects to and complements, the existing Montreal Metro operated by the STM, as well as the Exo commuter rail. It is fully fare-integrated with ARTM's system. Trains on the network are fully automated and driverless, as well as equipped with air conditioning for summer operations. All stations on the network are heated, and the system's three underground stations are also air-conditioned. The network features platform screen doors at every station.

The line was built by CDPQ Infra, a subsidiary of the Caisse de dépôt et placement du Québec, an institutional investor that manages various public and para-public pension plans and insurance programs in Quebec. The first section of the REM between the Brossard on the South Shore and Central Station in Downtown Montreal opened on 31 July 2023. The system was formally inaugurated on 14 November 2025 in a ceremony attended by Prime Minister Mark Carney, Premier of Quebec François Legault and Mayor of Montreal Soraya Martinez Ferrada. The second section of the REM opened on 17 November 2025, extending the line north through the Mont Royal Tunnel and to the northwest to Deux-Montagnes. The third section of the REM opened on 18 May 2026, extending the line west to Anse-à-l'Orme.

== History ==
=== Background ===
The Réseau express métropolitain has its origin in various railway projects, realized or not, which have succeeded each other in Montreal since the beginning of the 20th century.

==== Mount Royal Tunnel and Deux-Montagnes line ====
In 1918, the Canadian Northern Railway (CNoR) completed construction of a tunnel under Mount Royal to allow its trains arriving from the north to reach downtown Montreal. Since ventilation in the tunnel was insufficient to use steam locomotives, the line through the tunnel was electrified from its opening. In the 1990s, the Agence Métropolitaine de Transport (AMT) took over operation of the Deux-Montagnes line from Canadian National, renovating it between 1993 and 1995 – with trains running through the tunnel to reach downtown Montreal.

===== Planned Red Line of Montreal Metro =====
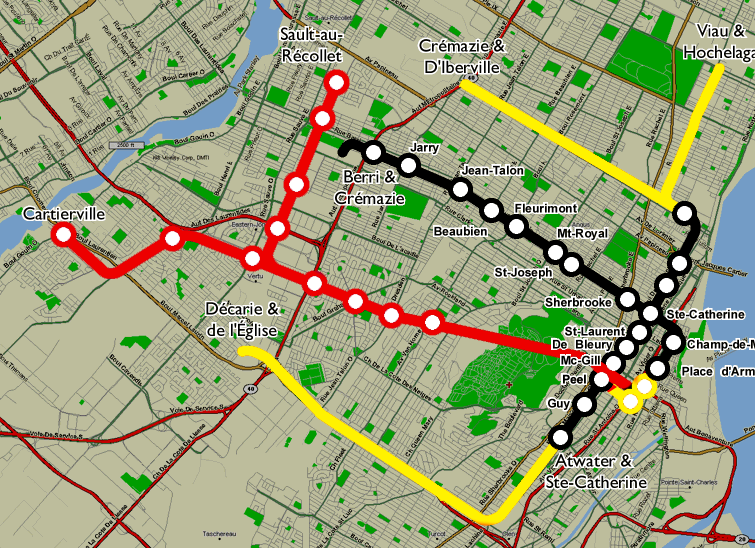
Montréal Métro 1961 project with line 3 in red and proposed extensions in yellow

When the Montreal Metro was developed in the 1960s, initial plans proposed a Red Line (French: Ligne rouge), also known as Line 3 (French: Ligne 3), that would have run north–south from downtown Montreal, using Canadian National Railway (CN) tracks passing under Mount Royal in the Mount Royal Tunnel, to reach the northwest suburb of Cartierville. When Montreal was chosen to host Expo 67 in 1962, the Red Line was dropped – with the Yellow Line (Line 4) linking Montreal to the South Shore suburbs being built instead.

The line was cancelled because:

- Trains would have to use steel wheels instead of rubber tires like the rest of the Metro cars because part (or most) of the line would have been exposed to the elements.
- There was a lack of agreement between CN, the City of Montreal and other municipalities regarding costs.
- Expo 67 made the construction of the Yellow Line a priority.

The Red Line was still planned for construction as a "regional metro" line in the early 1980s, reduced to a total of 9 stations.

The tracks were used by the commuter rail Deux-Montagnes line between 1995 and 2020, and forms the central section of the Réseau express métropolitain since the completion of the Deux-Montagnes branch in November 2025.

In 1982, the following stations were planned for the line:

- Gare Centrale
- Vincent D'Indy
- Mont-Royal
- Côte-Vertu
- Bois-Franc
- A-Ma-Baie
- Roxboro
- Laval
- Deux-Montagnes

Other proposed but cancelled Montreal Metro lines include Line 6 and the White Line.

==== Train de l'Ouest ====
Vaudreuil–Hudson, a commuter rail line serving the west of Montreal, shares its tracks with freight trains, thereby limiting the quantity and frequency of trains that can be run. From the 2000s onwards, municipalities in the west of the island pushed for improved commuter train service. The AMT proposed upgrades and improvements to the Vaudreuil–Hudson line, with the Aéroports de Montréal proposing an automated light metro (similar to the Canada Line in Vancouver) to serve the airport and the surrounding area.

==== South Shore ====
From the 1970s onwards, proposals for improved public transport to connect the South Shore with downtown Montreal were made, often proposing the use of the Champlain Bridge, which opened in 1962. In the 1990s and 2000s, proposals were made for a light rail line that would use the Champlain Bridge ice control structure to cross the St. Lawrence River. In 2011, the Canadian government announced that a new bridge would be built to replace the existing Champlain Bridge, with two lanes reserved for public transit. In 2013, the Quebec government announced that it was proposing a new light rail line to cross the bridge. The new Champlain Bridge opened in 2019, with a separate deck reserved for the future rail corridor.

=== Announcement ===
On 13 January 2015, Premier of Quebec Philippe Couillard and Michael Sabia, CEO of the Caisse de dépôt et placement du Québec (CDPQ), announced that the Crown corporation would define, build and finance major transportation projects in the province, with CA$7.4 billion planned to be spent on infrastructure from 2014 to 2024. Two of these projects were the South Shore Line and the Train de l'Ouest toward the West Island, which eventually merged to become the core of the Réseau express métropolitain project.

On 22 April 2016, Sabia and Montreal mayor Denis Coderre unveiled the project, then known as the Réseau électrique métropolitain (REM) to the media. The estimated completion date for the first portion of the system was December 2020. On 22 June 2016, CDPQ Infra published two requests for qualification: one for the engineering, procurement, and construction contract and the other for the rolling stock, systems, operation, and maintenance. The estimated values of the two contracts were $4 billion and $1.5 billion, respectively.

On 25 November 2016, CDPQ Infra announced the addition of three new stations to the project. These new stations—Bassin Peel (which eventually became Griffintown–Bernard-Landry), McGill, and Édouard-Montpetit—would improve downtown Montreal service by integrating the REM with the Montreal Metro through connections to the Green and Blue Lines. Included with news of the three new stations was an increased price tag of $5.9 billion for the entire project.

On 15 June 2017, the Government of Canada pledged $1.28 billion to finance the project, completing the financing of the project. In February 2018, CDPQ Infra announced that the project had been renamed Réseau express métropolitain (REM), would cost $6.3 billion to build, and that the network would open gradually between 2021 and 2023 – starting with the South Shore.

=== Procurement ===
On 28 June 2016, CDPQ Infra launched two public tenders in parallel: one for "Engineering, Procurement and Construction" (EPC, or "Ingénierie, Approvisionnement et Construction des infrastructures" (IAC) in French), and a second, for "Rolling Stock, Systems and Operation and Maintenance Services" (RSSOM, or "Fourniture du Matériel Roulant, de Systèmes de conduite automatique et de Services d'Exploitation et de Maintenance" (MRSEM) in French). The estimated values of the two contracts were $4 billion and $1.5 billion, respectively. Following a prequalification phase, the Caisse's subsidiary announced, on 10 November 2016, the qualified candidates that would be allowed to submit a bid:

- For the EPC contract, the competitors were:
  - (1) the Groupe NouvLR consortium, composed of SNC-Lavalin Grands Projets, Dragados, Aecon, Pomerleau, EPC, and AECOM
  - (2) the Kiewit-Eurovia consortium, formed by Kiewit Corporation, Eurovia, WSP Global, and Parsons Corporation
- For the RSSOM contract, three companies and consortia were in competition:
  - (1) Bombardier Transportation alone
  - (2) Alliance Montréal Mobilité, composed of Parsons Corporation, Hyundai Rotem, RATP Dev, and Thales Canada
  - (3) the Groupe des Partenaires pour la Mobilité des Montréalais, composed of Alstom and SNC-Lavalin O&M

Ansaldo STS-Hitachi and China Railway International were not allowed to bid.

According to La Presse, final bids were submitted to CDPQ Infra on 27 October 2017. On 10 November 2017, the date of the planned announcement of the selected contractors, the procurement process was "postponed indefinitely" to provide more time for analysis and evaluation of the bids received. On 8 February 2018, CDPQ Infra finally announced its selection: the Groupe NouvLR consortium for the EPC contract (SNC-Lavalin Grands Projets, Dragados, Aecon, Pomerleau, EBC, and AECOM) and the Groupe des Partenaires pour la Mobilité des Montréalais for the RSSOM contract (Alstom and SNC-Lavalin O&M). As part of RSSOM contract, Alstom would deliver 212 Alstom Metropolis cars, forming 106 two-car trains. The contracts' total value was estimated to be around $6.3 billion, of which approximately 80% was for the EPC contract. Groupe PMM rebranded as "Pulsar" in October 2025.

=== Construction ===
Preparatory work began in late March 2018. On 12 April 2018, the project officially broke ground. In December 2019, CDPQ revised the capital cost of the project to $6.5 billion, an increase of $230 million. In February 2020, CDPQ confirmed the names of the 26 stations on the network.

In October 2020, the tunnel boring machine "Alice" (named after Canadian geologist Alice Wilson) started the tunnelling process to Montréal–Trudeau International Airport. In October 2020, the first completed train arrived in Montreal from India, where it had been manufactured.

In November 2020, a disruption from an "unexpected" explosion during the renovation of the Mount Royal Tunnel, likely caused by leftover century-old explosives, delayed the opening of the central section of the REM from 2022 to 2023.

In June 2021, CDPQ updated the project cost to $6.9 billion, an increase of $350 million, citing impacts from the COVID-19 pandemic in Montreal. In June 2022, CDPQ Infra acknowledged that construction issues with the Mount Royal Tunnel, labour shortages, and material supply issues would postpone the opening of most REM stations to 2024. The delay had also resulted in higher costs for the project overall, exceeding the previously projected budget of $6.9 billion. No new estimate of the project cost was provided.

In November 2024, CDPQ announced that major construction work on the central section of the line had been completed, with testing to follow in 2025. An updated opening date of the fourth quarter of 2025 was announced. CDPQ also stated that the project cost had increased to CA$8.34 billion – noting that they shouldered responsibility for cost overruns. Construction on the branch to Montréal–Trudeau International Airport continued, with an estimated opening date of the first quarter of 2027.

=== Operational history ===
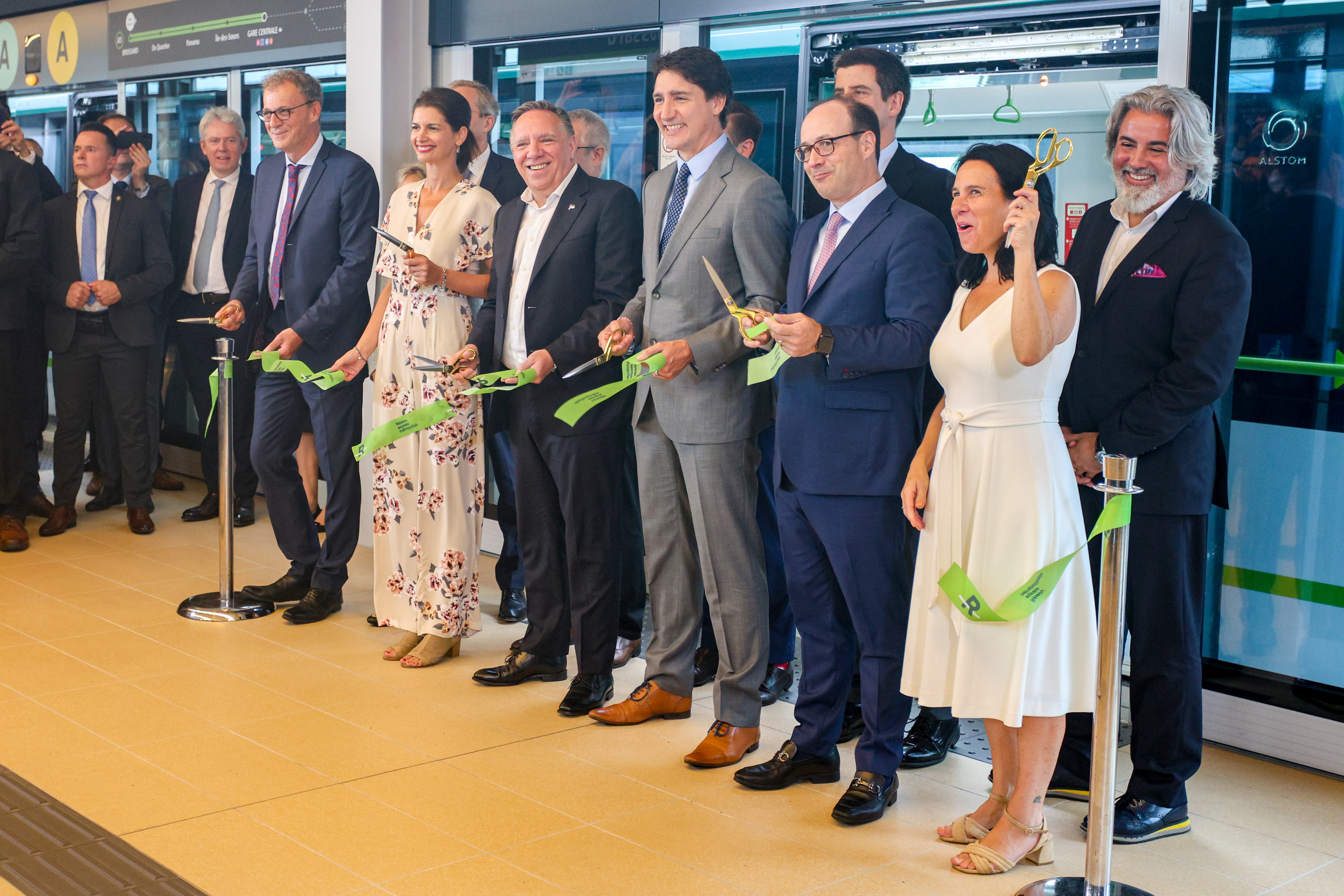
Opening ceremony of the first five stations in July 2023

The first five stations on the network, between Central Station and Brossard, opened for full service on 31 July 2023. An opening ceremony was held on 28 July 2023, with Prime Minister Justin Trudeau, Premier of Quebec François Legault, Mayor of Montreal Valérie Plante, president and CEO of CDPQ Charlies Emond, and president and CEO of CDPQ Infra Jean-Marc Arbaud inaugurating the line.

On the weekend of 29 and 30 July 2023, free service was available to the public. On the first day of public access, over 20,000 people rode the REM in the morning, prompting staff to turn away new riders.

Within the first three days of revenue operation, the new line suffered a number of service disruptions caused by stuck railway switches and computer issues. A spokesperson remarked that "there's always some adjustments to be made" with a new system on the scale of the REM.

As of 11 September 2023, the system had carried more than 1 million passengers, with daily ridership of more than 30,000 for the month following its opening. In April 2024, CDPQ announced that weekday ridership had increased again, with "up to 36,000 daily riders". In September 2024, average weekday ridership had risen to 37,000 daily passengers, with Tuesdays being the busiest day (42,000 passengers). During an interview with Radio-Canada in February 2025, president and chief executive officer of CDPQ Infra Jean-Marc Arbaud stated ridership had increased to 45,000 on its busiest day.

Dynamic testing on the north and west branches of the line began in mid-2024. Weekend service was stopped from February to mid-September 2025 to allow final installations and testing to take place. From 5 July 2025 to 17 August 2025, the REM shut down completely to enable testing of the central section of the line, which was scheduled to open in November 2025. Several shuttle bus lines were made available to customers during the service interruption.

On 25 September 2025, it was announced that the branch to Anse-à-l'Orme would be delayed to open sometime in the second quarter of 2026.

The REM system was formally inaugurated on 14 November 2025 in a ceremony attended by Prime Minister Mark Carney, Premier of Quebec François Legault, Montreal Mayor Soraya Martinez Ferrada and CEO of Caisse de dépôt et placement du Québec Charles Emond. The entire REM line, including the new stations, was free to ride on the weekend of 15 and 16 November. The 14-station extension to Deux-Montagnes officially opened for revenue service on 17 November. Four stations opened on 18 May 2026 on the Anse-à-l'Orme branch in the next stage.

With the opening of the A4 branch in November 2025 and the A3 branch in May 2026, ridership increased to an average of 130,000 on weekdays as of September 2026, with a peak of 149,000 on Tuesday, September 22, a new record for the network.

=== Future branch and stations ===
The branch to Montréal–Trudeau International Airport is planned to open in 2027 with two stations. On 16 June 2026, the REM announced that the planning phase for Griffintown–Bernard-Landry station was proceeding, as well as another station in the Bridge and Wellington area to the east.

== Route ==
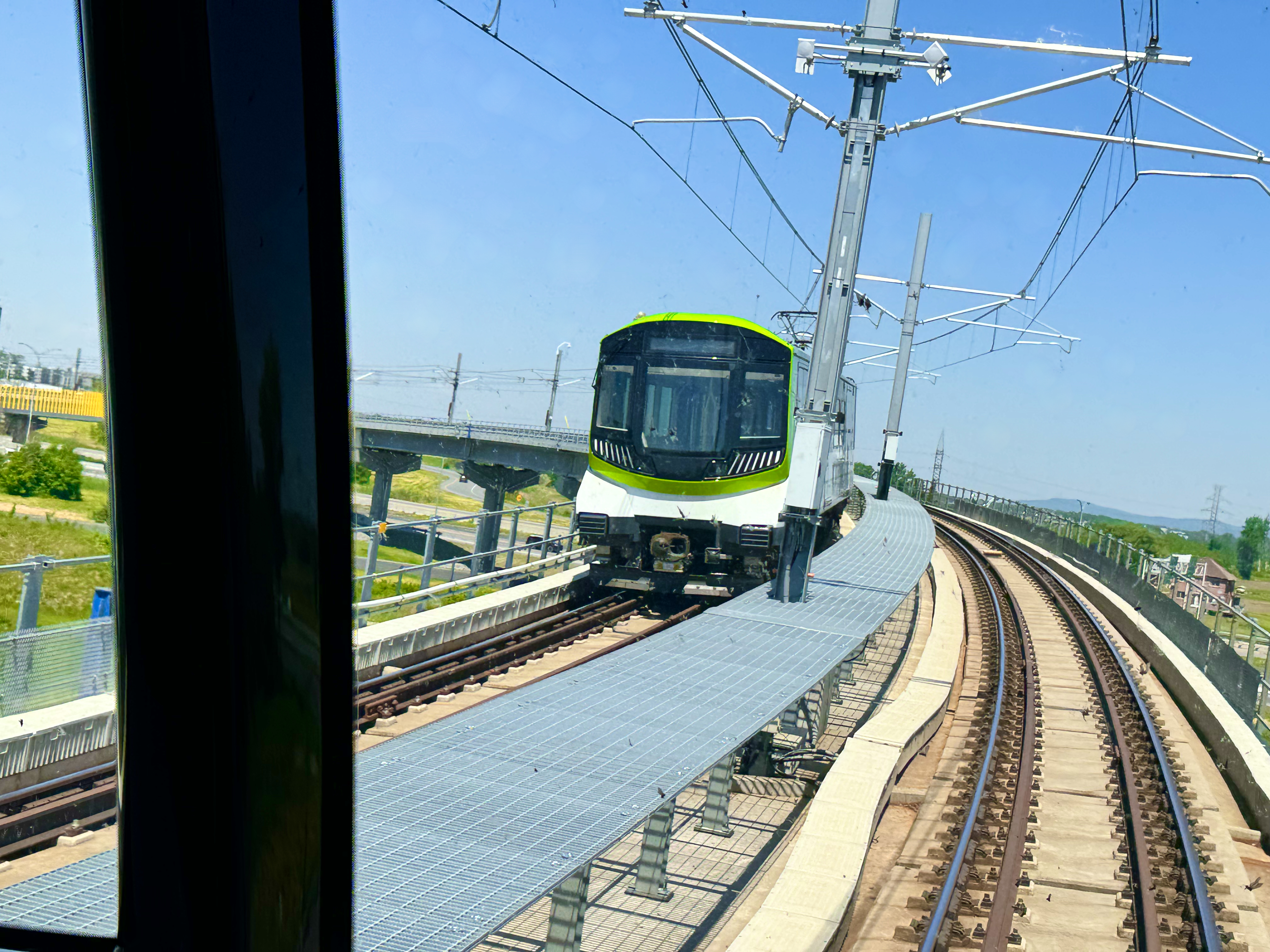
A train between Du Quartier and Brossard stations

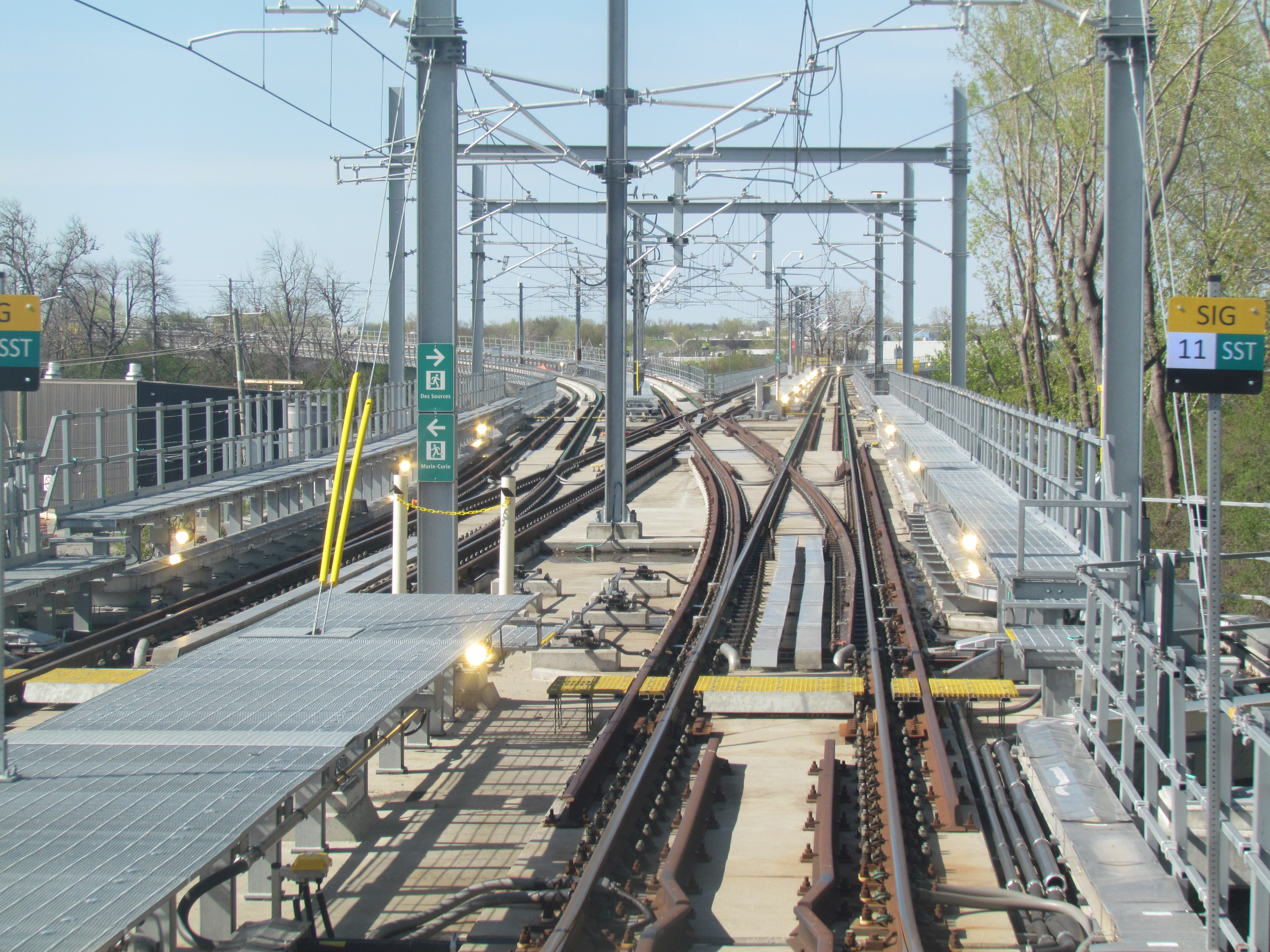
Junction between the Airport and Anse-à-l'Orme branches

Train service destinations are identified as A1, A2, A3 and A4.

The primary route follows the Mount Royal Tunnel, where new underground stations have been built to connect with the existing McGill and Édouard-Montpetit Metro stations. A new connection to the Mascouche commuter rail line was built near the A-40 at the Côte-de-Liesse station to allow this line, which previously used the tunnel, to have access to downtown.

Southeast from Central Station, the line follows existing rail lines until Marc-Cantin Street, where it transitions to an elevated guideway and crosses to Nuns' Island, and then uses a rail deck constructed on the new Champlain Bridge to cross the St. Lawrence River. Three stations in Brossard on the South Shore have been built: Panama, connecting to the existing bus terminal; Du Quartier, directly connected to the DIX30 commercial district; and Brossard, the site of a bus terminal built along with the station, along with the line's maintenance depot.

The northwest branch is a conversion of the Deux-Montagnes line, with a second track added beyond Bois-Franc station and all at-grade crossings eliminated. On the West Island, a new airport branch will separate from the main line near the A-13, with a stop at Technoparc Montreal, before terminating at Montréal–Trudeau International Airport. The main West Island branch follows an existing freight rail spur through Pointe-Claire, then crosses and follows the A-40 just east of St-Jean Boulevard and continues through Kirkland before ending in Sainte-Anne-de-Bellevue. These lines are mostly elevated to avoid at-grade crossings.

In the city centre, Central Station connects with the Orange Line at Bonaventure, McGill with the Green Line and Édouard-Montpetit with the Blue Line.

== Stations ==
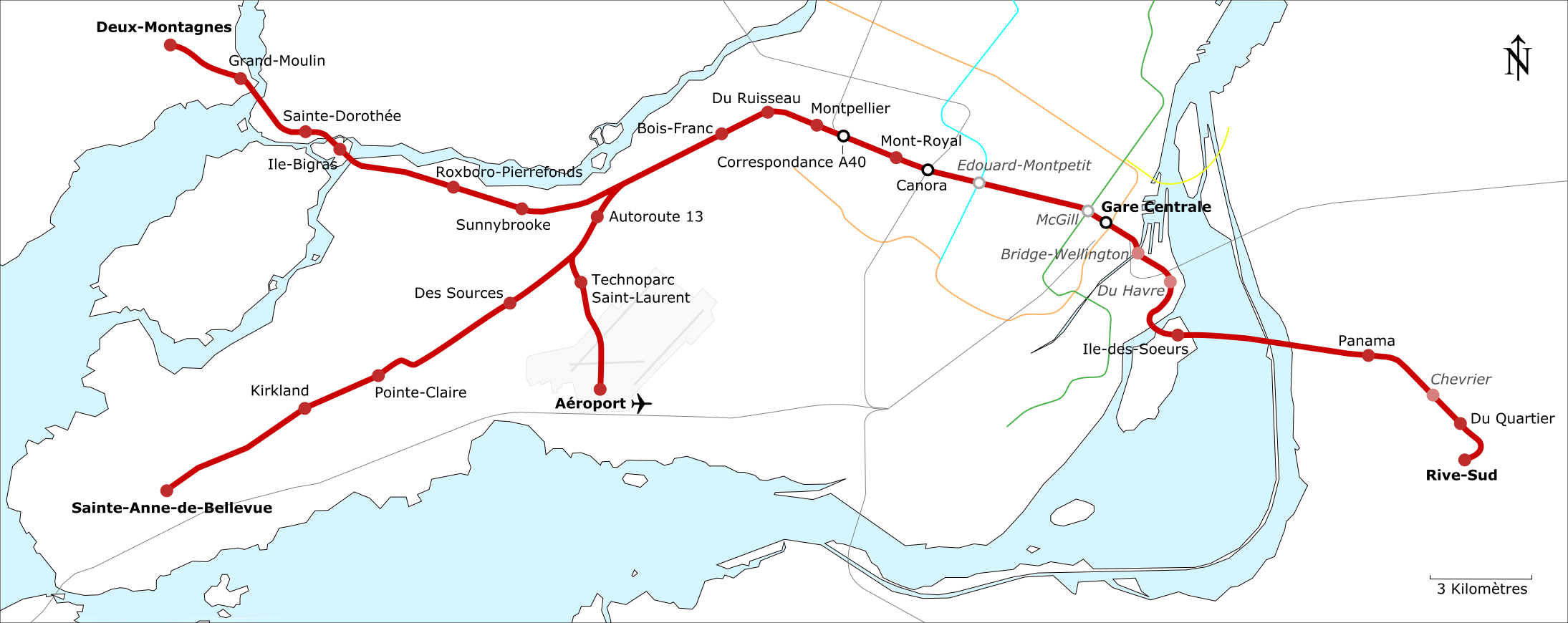
Map of the proposed REM network in 2016

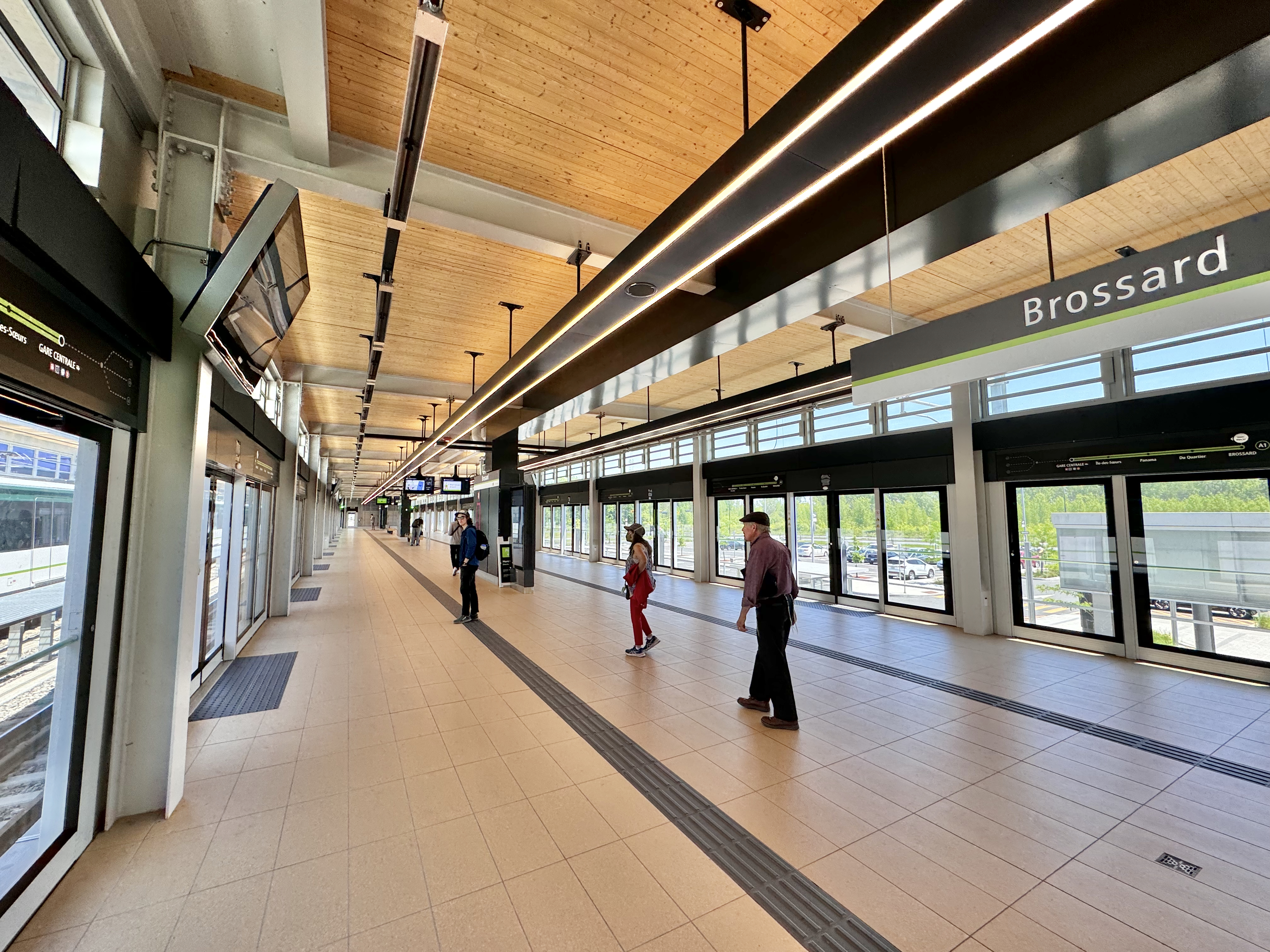
Passengers prepare to board at Brossard station

When fully completed, the REM will consist of 26 stations on three branches. Twelve of these stations are on the former suburban Deux-Montagnes line and became part of the REM after being converted to rapid transit standards. Several have received new names since the project's inception. All stations on the REM will be accessible, and STM Metro interchange stations at McGill and Édouard-Montpetit have been retrofitted for accessibility.

=== Main line ===
All stations on the main line of the Réseau express métropolitain have a train frequency of 2.5 minutes during rush hour and 5 minutes at other times, both toward Brossard station and toward the three different branches.

Station	Opening for REM	Opened	Parking spaces	Bike racks	Connections	Location
Brossard	31 July 2023		2,948	50	Terminus Brossard	Brossard
Du Quartier	31 July 2023		—	74	Réseau de transport de Longueuil	Brossard
Panama	31 July 2023		700	200	Terminus Panama	Brossard
Île-des-Sœurs	31 July 2023		—	20	STM	Verdun
Griffintown–Bernard-Landry	2030		—	—	STM	Le Sud-Ouest
Bridge–Bonaventure	2030		—	—	STM	Le Sud-Ouest
Central Station	31 July 2023	1943	—	—	Via Rail; Amtrak; Mont-Saint-Hilaire line; at Bonaventure; STM; Terminus Centre-Ville; RÉSO underground city	Ville-Marie
McGill	17 November 2025	1966	—	—	at McGill; STM; RÉSO underground city	Ville-Marie
Édouard-Montpetit	17 November 2025	1988	—	30	at Édouard-Montpetit; STM	Côte-des-Neiges–Notre-Dame-de-Grâce
Canora	17 November 2025	1918	—	100	STM	Côte-des-Neiges–Notre-Dame-de-Grâce
Ville-de-Mont-Royal	17 November 2025	1918	—	60	STM	Mont Royal
Côte-de-Liesse	17 November 2025	17 November 2025	—	35	Mascouche line; STM	Saint-Laurent
Montpellier	17 November 2025	1918	—	60	STM STM	Saint-Laurent
Du Ruisseau	17 November 2025	1994	1,054	45	STM	Saint-Laurent
Bois-Franc	17 November 2025	1994	689	120	STM; Société de transport de Laval	Saint-Laurent

=== Deux-Montagnes branch ===
Trains on the Deux-Montagnes branch run every 5 minutes during rush hour and 15 minutes at other times.

Station	Opening for REM	Opened	Parking spots	Bike racks	Connections	Location
Sunnybrooke	17 November 2025	1994	494	40	STM STM	Pierrefonds-Roxboro
Pierrefonds-Roxboro	17 November 2025	1944	901	80	STM	Pierrefonds-Roxboro
Île-Bigras	17 November 2025	1995	48	20	None	Laval
Sainte-Dorothée	17 November 2025	1995	848	45	Société de transport de Laval	Laval
Grand-Moulin	17 November 2025	1925	236	44	Exo	Deux-Montagnes
Deux-Montagnes	17 November 2025	1995	967	247	Exo	Deux-Montagnes

=== Anse-à-l'Orme branch ===
Trains on the Anse-à-l'Orme (formerly Sainte-Anne-de-Bellevue) branch run every ten minutes during rush hour and every fifteen minutes at other times.

Station	Opened	Parking spots	Bike racks	Connections	Location
Des Sources	18 May 2026	500	20	STM	Pointe-Claire
Fairview–Pointe-Claire	18 May 2026	700	50	Terminus Fairview-Pointe-Claire	Pointe-Claire
Kirkland	18 May 2026	2,500	30	STM	Kirkland
Anse-à-l'Orme	18 May 2026	200	20	STM; STM; Exo	Sainte-Anne-de-Bellevue

=== YUL–Aéroport-Montréal–Trudeau branch ===
Trains on the Airport branch of the Réseau express métropolitain are projected to run every ten minutes during rush hour and every fifteen minutes at other times. The extension will provide a direct air-to-rail link, improving on the existing connection from the Dorval station via a shuttle bus.

Station	Planned opening	Parking spots	Bike racks	Connections	Location
Marie-Curie	Q4 2027	—	—	STM	Saint-Laurent
YUL–Aéroport-Montréal–Trudeau	Q4 2027	—	—	Montréal–Trudeau International Airport; STM	Dorval

== Rolling stock ==
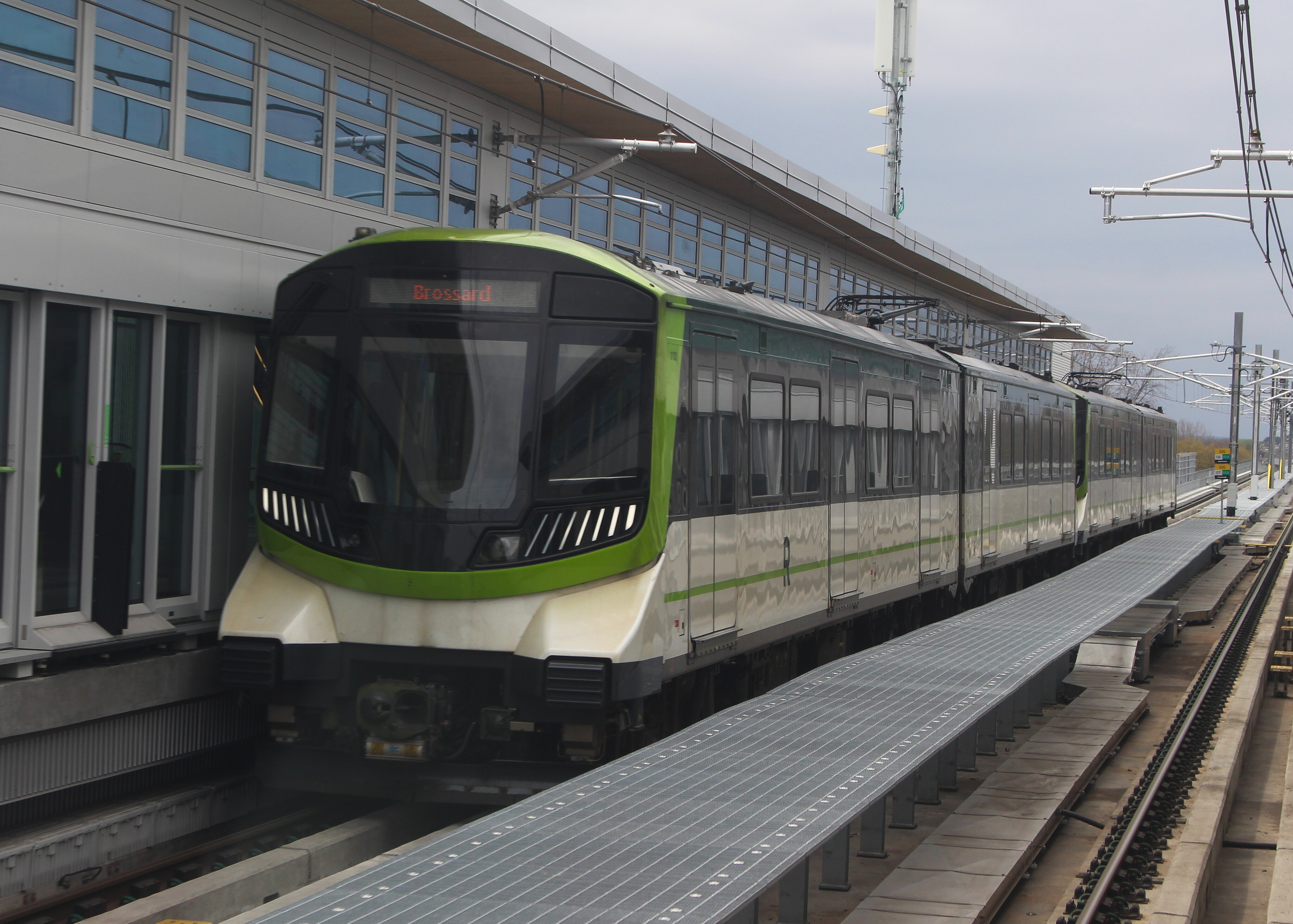
Alstom Metropolis Saint-Laurent at Pierrefonds-Roxboro station

The Alstom Metropolis Saint-Laurent is a type of light metro train built by Alstom for the Réseau express métropolitain, using the Alstom Metropolis platform. Trains run as a single two-car train at quieter times and as paired four-car trainsets during rush hour. The trains are fully automated (GoA4), with no driver or attendant on board.

In April 2018, a $2.8-billion contract was awarded to Alstom and SNC-Lavalin to deliver a driverless light metro, including rolling stock and automatic signalling, and to operate and maintain the line. This contract included 212 Alstom Metropolis cars, forming 106 two-car trains. Built at Alstom's Sri City plant in India, the trains were delivered to Montreal by ship.

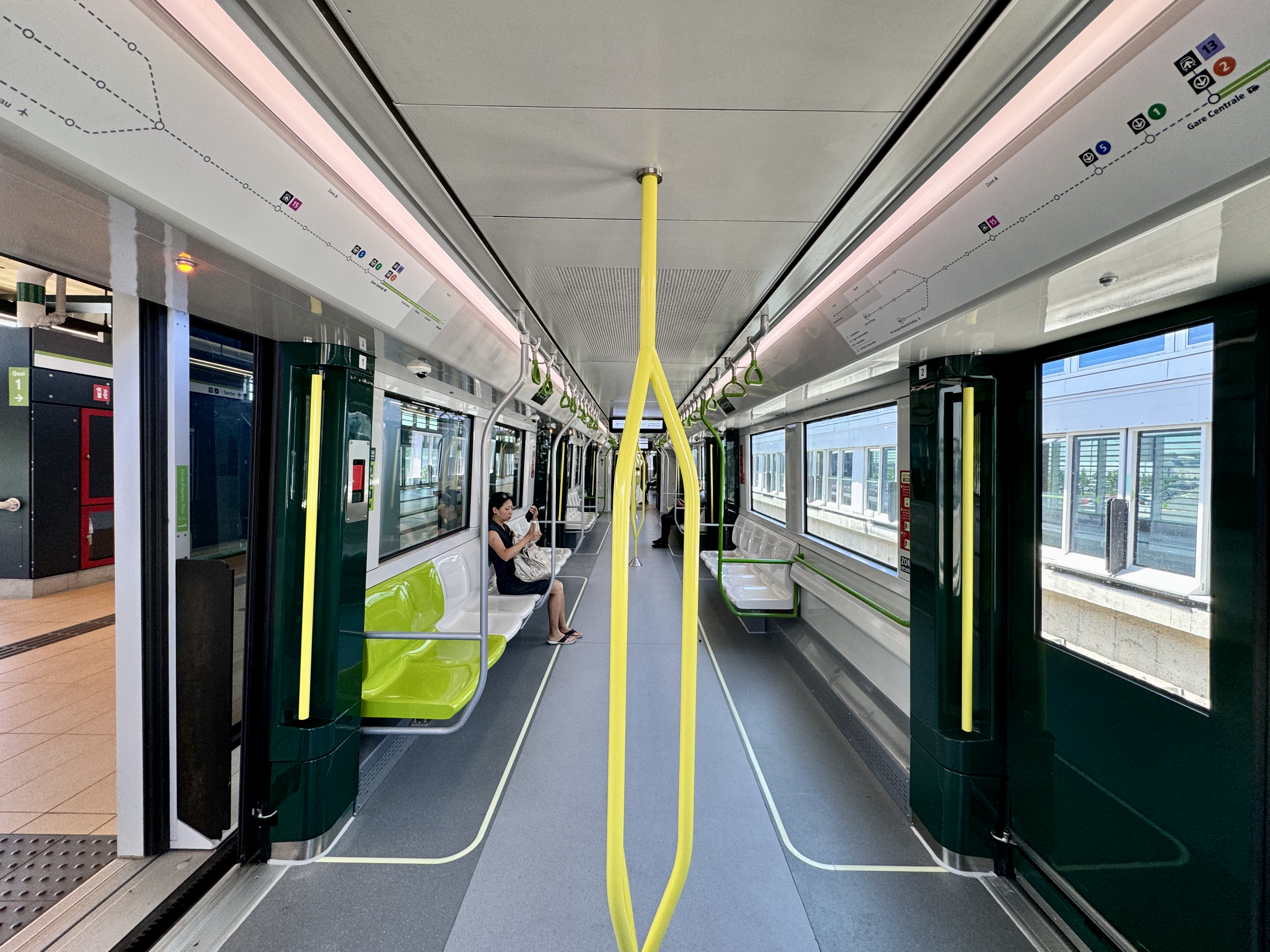
Each two-car train seats 64 passengers

Each two-car train seats 64 passengers, with standing capacity for around 300. A four-car trainset can carry a maximum of 780 people at rush hour. The livery is white, grey, and bright green, matching the REM logo. The trains have large front windows, allowing passengers to take in views from the front of the train. A dedicated space for wheelchair users is available, and the trains feature Wi-Fi, air conditioning, and heated floors. CDPQ Infra indicated it is "confident that the trains ... will be able to withstand ... winter conditions", with the trains featuring double glazing, ice-scraping pantographs, and heated automatic couplings. The front lights of the trains are inspired by the Champlain Bridge.

Compared to the Azur trains used on the Montreal Metro, the REM trains use steel wheels rather than rubber tires, are 17% wider, are faster (with a top speed of 100 kilometres per hour (62 mph) on the Champlain Bridge), and are fully automated. However, the REM trains are shorter and can carry fewer passengers per trainset, although the REM has the ability to increase capacity to meet demand by coupling two trains together. The REM metro trains are also exposed to the weather, unlike the fully underground existing metro system.

== Architecture and artwork ==
=== Architecture ===
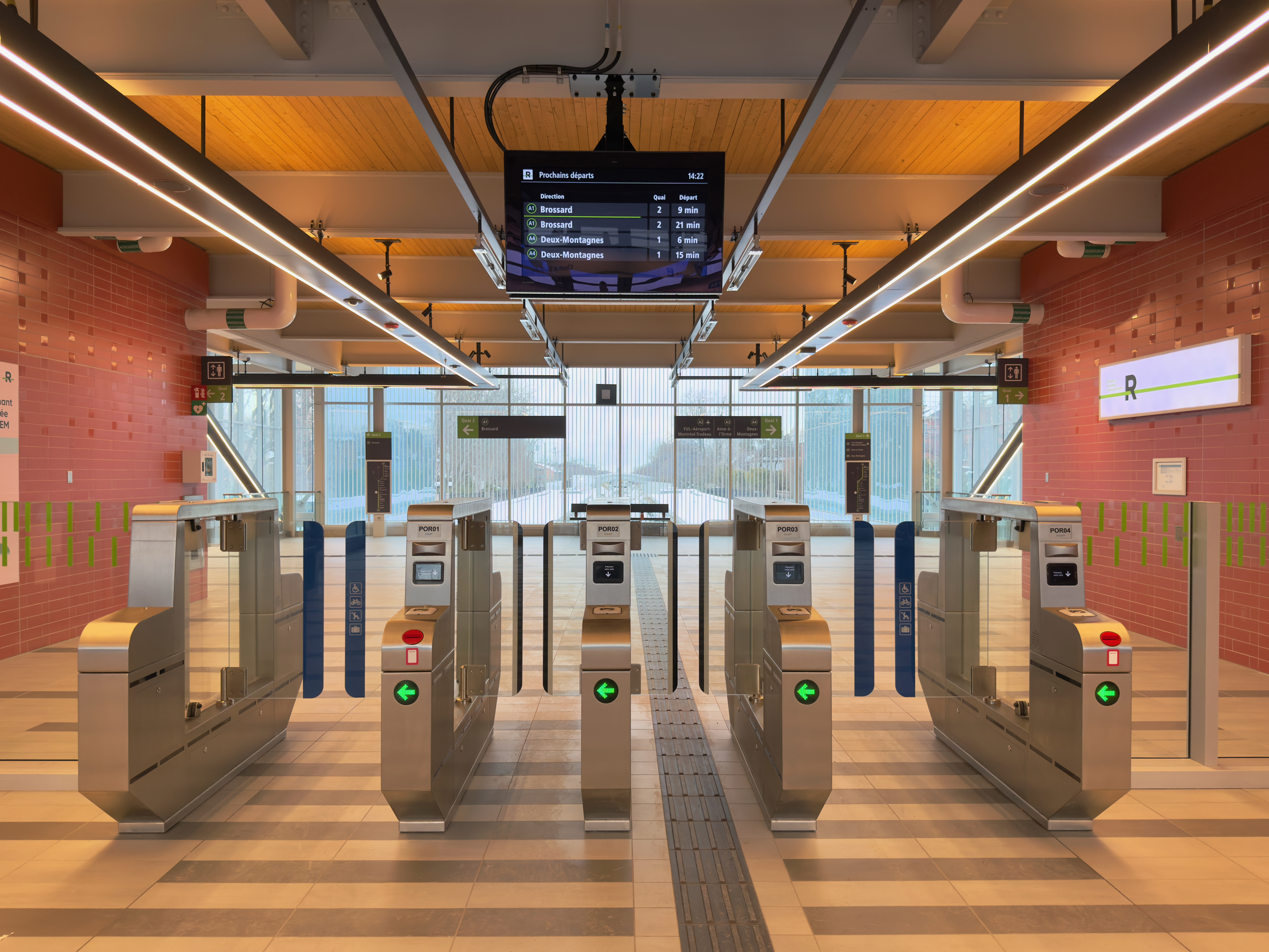
Red brick walls on the side of the mezzanine at Canora station

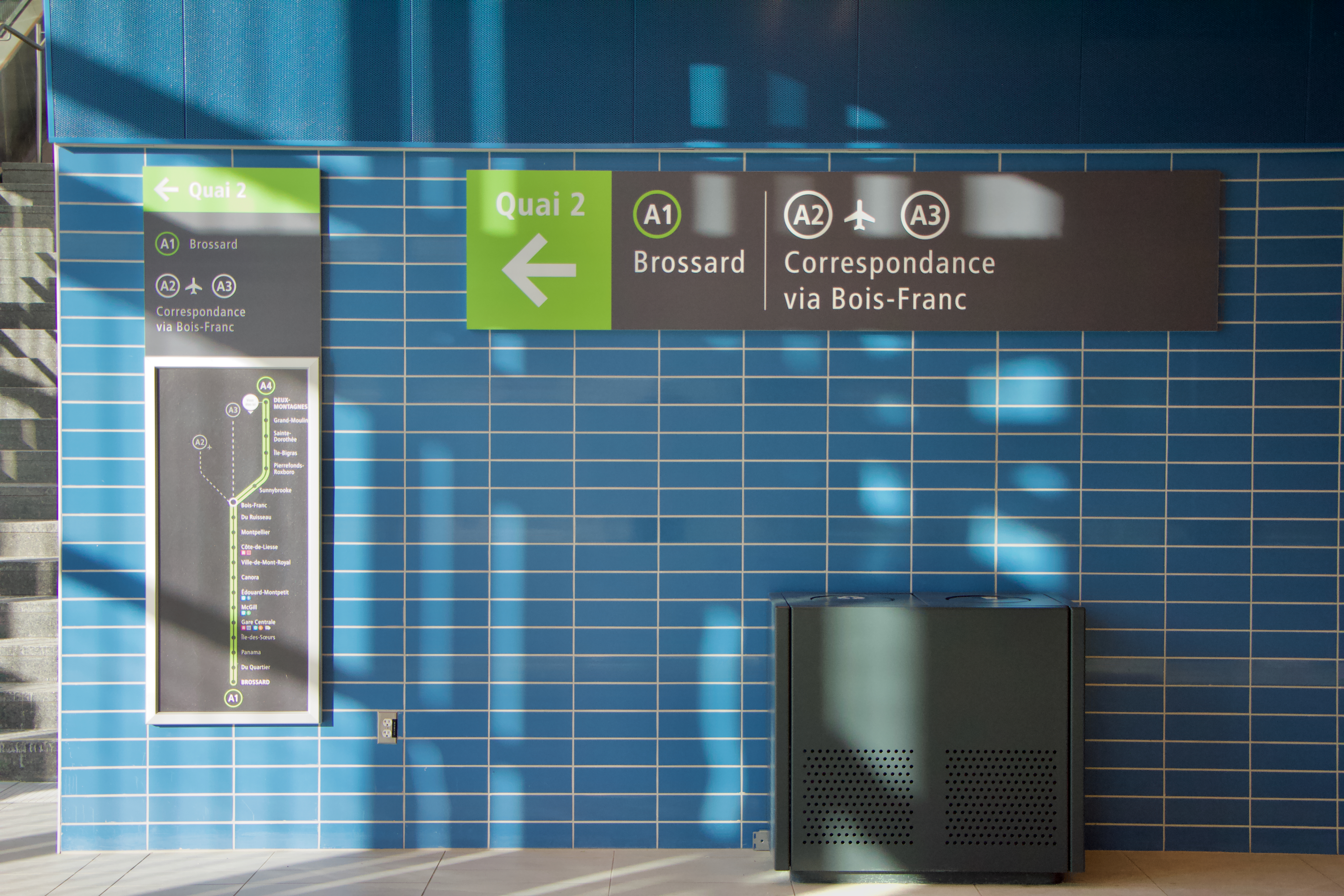
Blue-tiled wall at Deux-Montagnes station

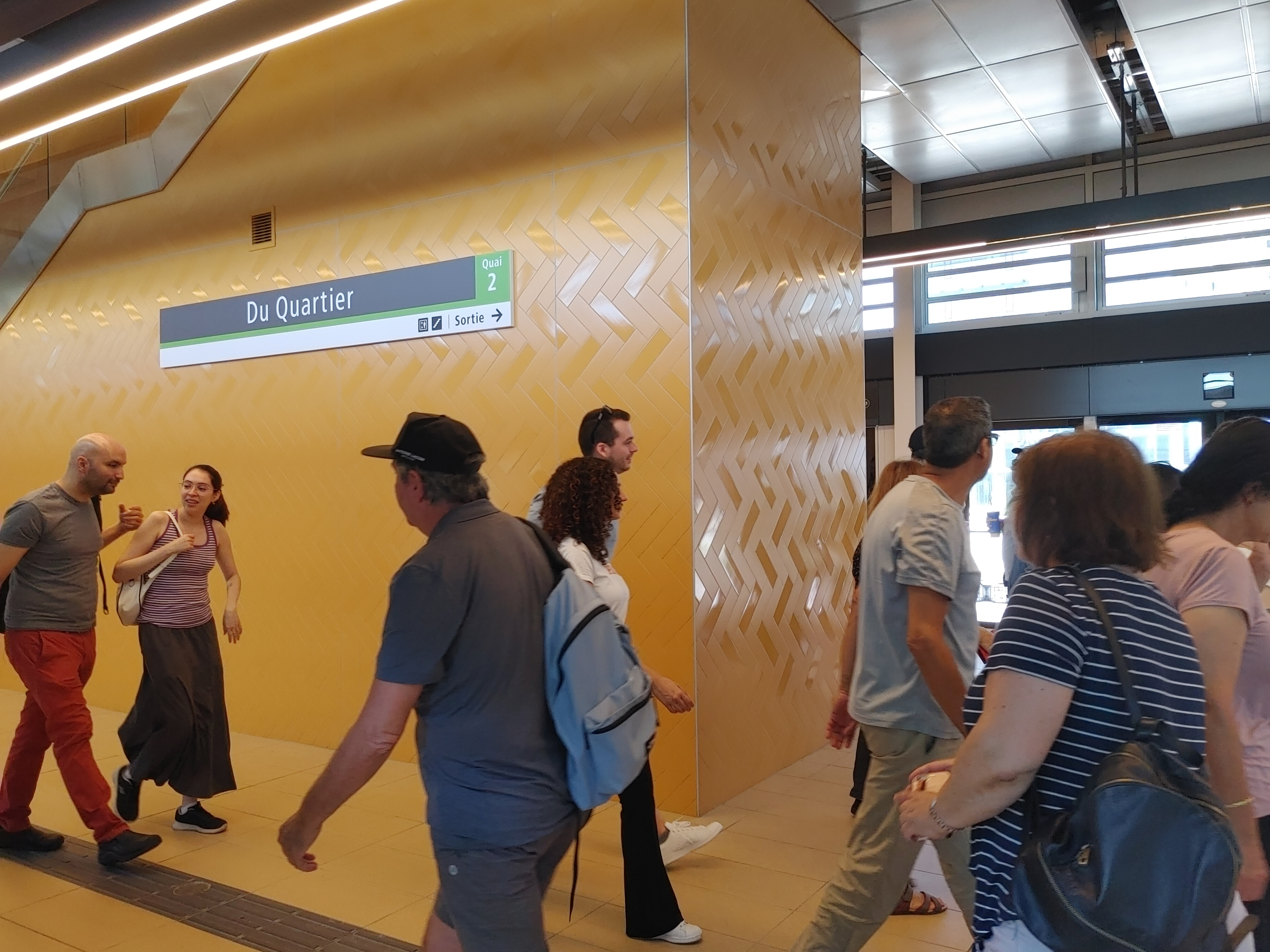
Yellow tiles at Du Quartier station

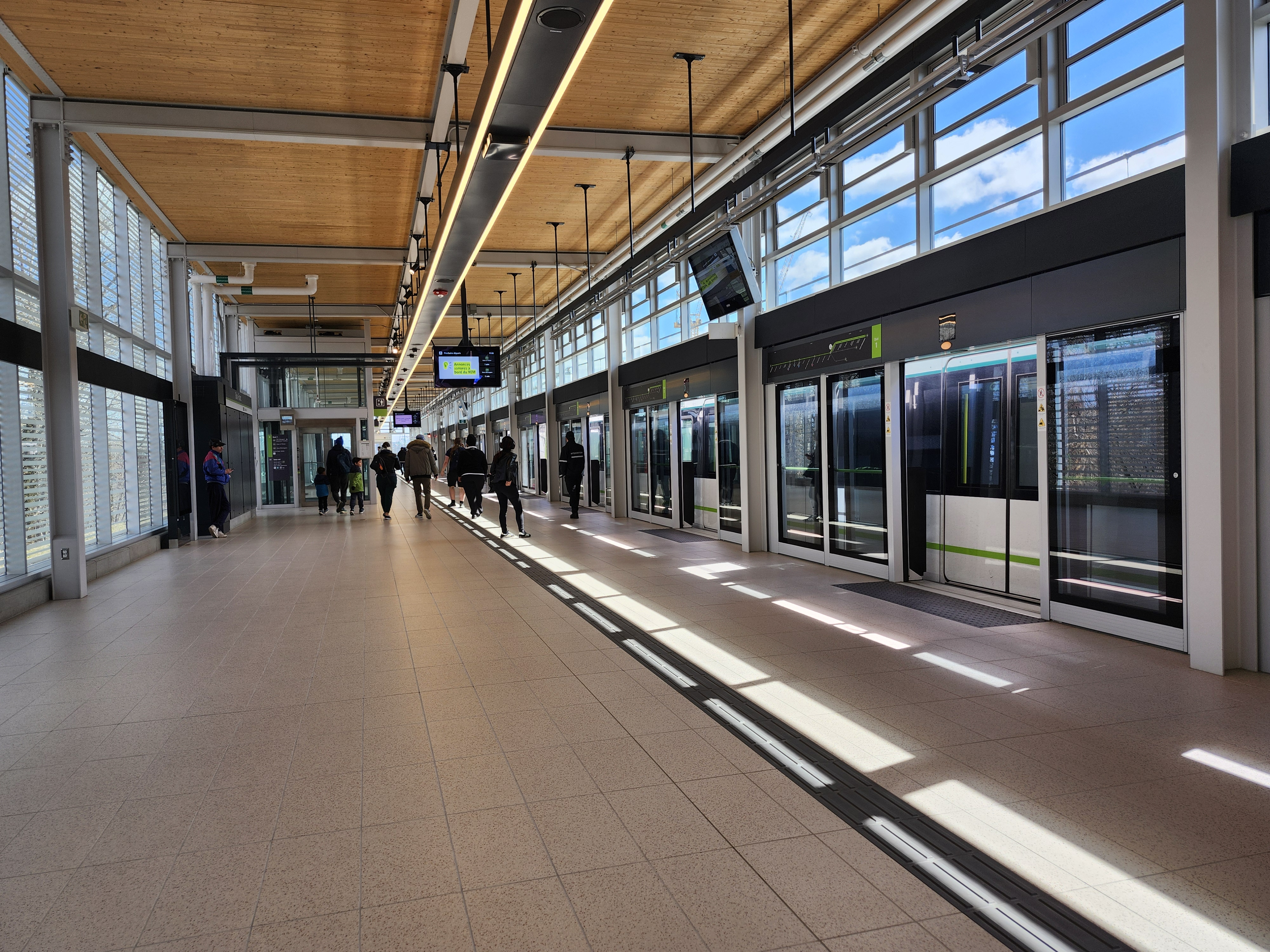
Glass sides and wood covered ceiling at Bois-Franc station

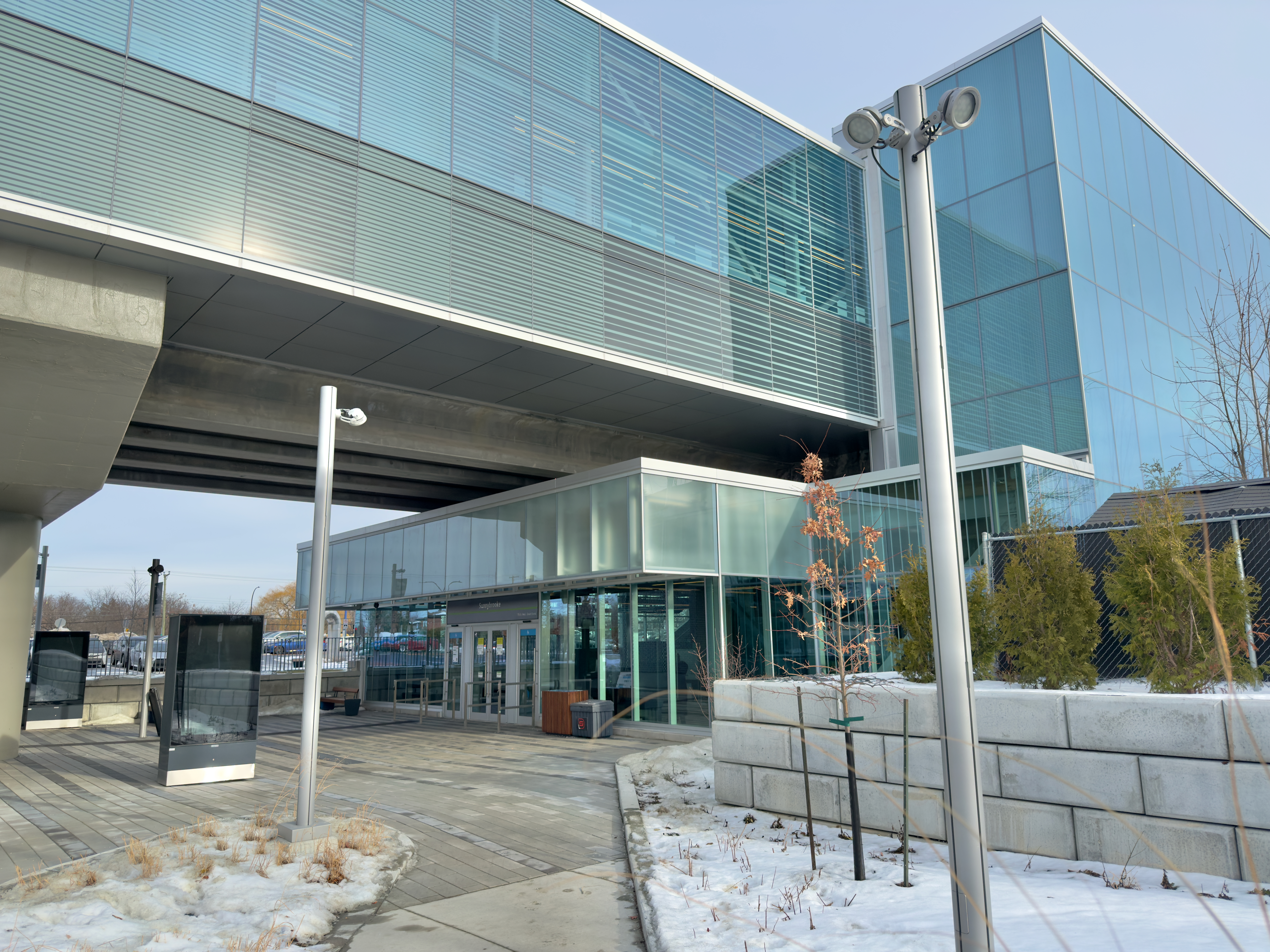
Glass clads the sides to Sunnybrooke station

Stations on the REM were designed by a joint venture of architects – Lemay, Perkins&Will and Bisson Fortin. Station designs generally feature glass, horizontal and vertical lines, and wood. Stations in different sections use tiles of different colours (yellow, white, red, silver, green and blue) to denote different local themes (fields, main stations, urban development, innovation, forests and water, respectively).

=== Artwork ===
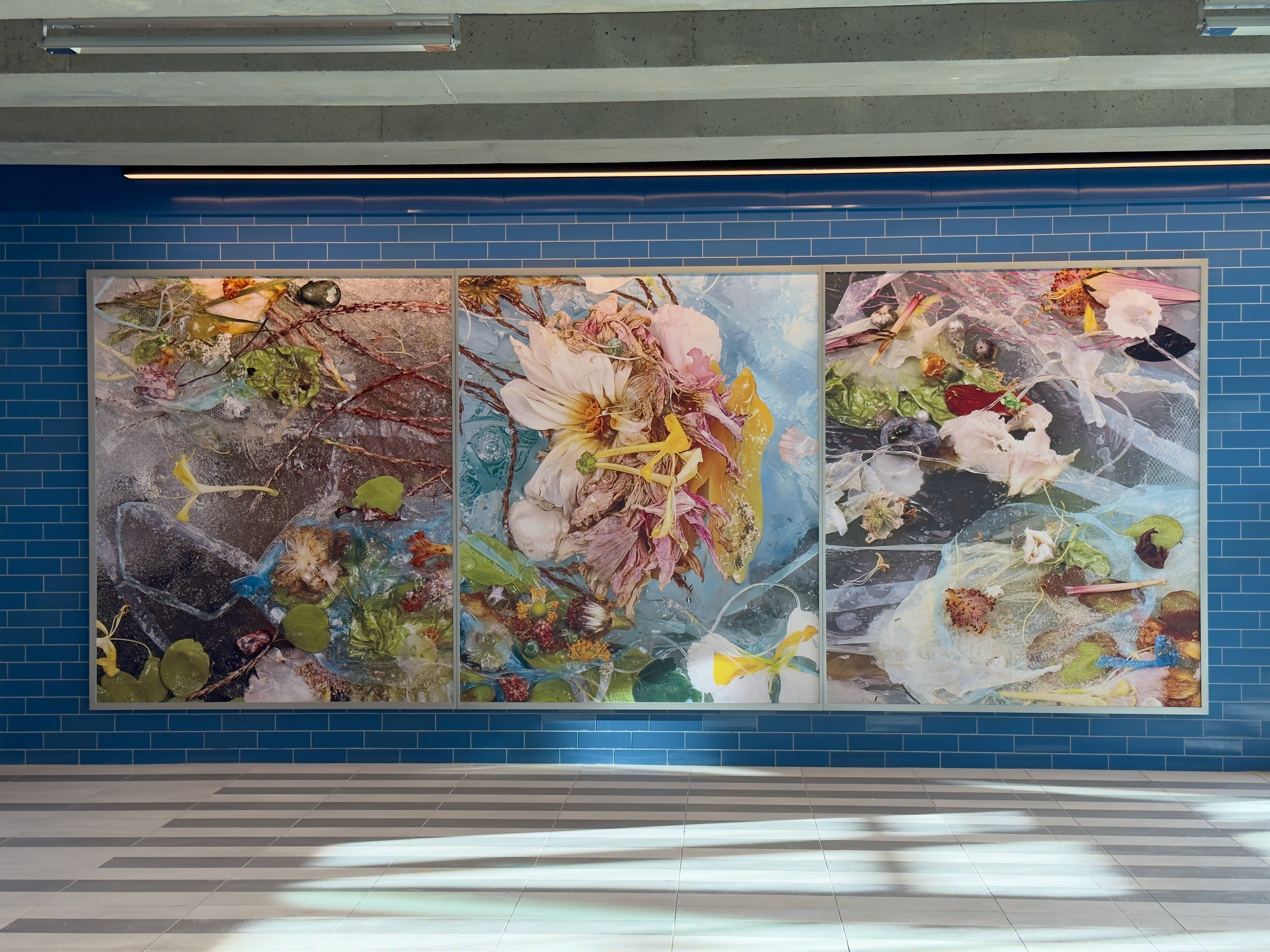
Triptych mural "Filets" by Michelle Bui in Sainte-Dorothée station

Across the REM, 12 pieces of permanent artwork will be installed at a cost of $7.3 million, as part of Quebec's percent for art programme. An additional $500,000 will fund temporary artworks, created by students of four Montreal universities (Concordia, McGill, Université de Montréal and Université du Québec à Montréal). The first works were unveiled in October 2024 at Brossard, Du Quartier, Panama, Île-des-Soeurs, and Gare Centrale stations. Further artworks such as the Anse-à-l'Orme, Sainte-Dorothée, Bois-Franc and Deux-Montagnes stations were announced in February 2025 and were completed in November 2025.

== Controversies ==
In a report prepared by the Bureau d'audiences publiques sur l'environnement (BAPE), released on 20 January 2017, CDPQ Infra was criticized for failing to provide crucial information on the project's financial model, environmental impact, and impact on ridership levels on existing public transit systems across Greater Montreal. Without such information, the BAPE declared that it was "premature to authorize the approval of this project". The BAPE also stated that CDPQ Infra had not met its obligations with regard to transparency, as it had failed to provide information in a timely fashion on the ridership levels of the REM's three branches. CDPQ Infra was also reproached for not studying the impact of the REM on existing public transit authorities. CDPQ Infra was criticized for not being able to answer questions like how much tickets would cost, whether municipalities served by the REM would have to pay for the necessary infrastructure for access to it, and whether municipalities would have to contribute to the REM's operation.

A lawsuit filed by Coalition Climat further alleged that the REM project violated federalism for a lack of federal assessment of the potential harm to citizens' environmental rights by its potential contribution to noise pollution and urban heat islands. The lawsuit was dismissed by the Quebec Superior Court on 13 December 2017.

Another controversy occurred in November 2019, when Montreal mayor Valerie Plante proposed naming Griffintown's REM station after former Quebec premier Bernard Landry, who was part of the Parti Québécois. This sparked a backlash from the city's Irish community. As a compromise, the station was named Griffintown–Bernard-Landry, which still proved controversial. Local politicians and transit advocates also noted their annoyance that the station was not opened with the other REM stations in August 2023, and that a construction staging yard was preventing the construction of a park in the neighbourhood.

== Financial model ==
As agreed in 2018, the financial model underpinning the project requires the Autorité régionale de transport métropolitain (ARTM) to pay CDPQ Infra $0.72 for each kilometre ($1.15 for each mile) traveled by a passenger following the project's opening. This amount will increase with inflation. CDPQ expects a rate of return of around 8 or 9 percent over the 99-year period.

Although fare revenues will not fund other transit projects or agencies (such as the Société de transport de Montréal), CDPQ argued that the REM will provide long-term income for pensions, stating, "when a user takes the REM, they are helping to finance their future retirement". CDPQ also argued that the project risk lies with itself and not the provincial government or municipalities.

The project's construction cost is financed through funding from CDPQ (initially $3.2 billion), the Government of Quebec ($1.283 billion), the Government of Canada ($1.283 billion), and Hydro-Québec ($295 million). CDPQ shouldered responsibility for cost overruns that ultimately amounted to $8.34 billion.

== Proposed lines, stations, and extensions ==
On 20 May 2019, the Quebec government announced that it had requested CDPQ Infra to study two REM extensions. One route would extend nearly 20 kilometres (12 mi) north to Carrefour Laval and the other nearly 30 kilometres (19 mi) south to Chambly and St-Jean-sur-Richelieu. The government also made a request to determine the best electrified transit system to be put in place for the East Island, with the possibility of it being a new REM project. The proposal became the REM de l'Est project.

=== Dorval station ===
The federal government had requested that the Canada Infrastructure Bank study a possible extension of the REM to Dorval Exo railway station and Dorval Via Rail station to connect with Exo and Via Rail trains. This station would have been about a 1-kilometre (0.62 mi) extension from the Airport station. The STM bus station is located south of the CP and CN tracks and west of the Via Rail station.

=== Bridge–Bonaventure station ===
The city of Montreal requested two stations instead of one at Bassin Peel. The second station would be added between Île-des-Soeurs and Griffintown–Bernard-Landry stations, just south of the Lachine Canal. In August 2024, CDPQ Infra noted that the station was technically feasible. On 16 June 2026, it was announced that the station would be built along with Griffintown–Bernard-Landry.

=== REM de l'Est ===
The REM de l'Est is a proposed second REM line that would have been 32 km (20 mi) long and included 23 stations. Announced in 2020, it would have used the same technology as the REM but would not be connected directly to the first section of the network.

Beginning a few blocks east of Robert-Bourassa Boulevard (and therefore from Central Station), the line would have run east on an elevated guideway along René-Lévesque Boulevard and Notre-Dame Street until St-Clément Street, where it would have turned north and split into two branches:

- One running elevated along Sherbrooke Street to Pointe-aux-Trembles
- One diving into a tunnel and running north to Cégep Marie-Victorin via Lacordaire

In May 2022, the project was abandoned, and as of mid-2023, nothing has been announced about its eventual replacement, which is under study, except that it is to be named Projet structurant de l’Est (PSE) instead of REM. But in August of 2026, Montreal's mayor, Soraya Martinez Ferrada stated her interest in bringing back the project, saying that "we spent 100 million on studies so why not take the studies and use them". The project was said to be shrunk down by scrapping the downtown section on Boulevard René-Lévesque. The mayor stated that she wants the REM to connect to the métro instead.

=== South Shore "REM 2.0" along Taschereau Boulevard axis ===
In partnership with the City of Longueuil and the Municipality of Brossard, the Quebec government announced a proposed extension of the REM through the South Shore of Montreal. This branch was originally referred to as REM 2.0, but was also commonly called the Taschereau REM, and was planned to connect the existing REM line at Terminus Panama to the Montreal metro at Terminus Longueuil. REM 2.0 would follow Taschereau Boulevard for much of its length, superseding earlier proposals for an electric tramway, the East–West Electric Line (Lien électrique est–ouest, or LÉEO), to connect these transit hubs. The government of Quebec suggested that this REM line could ultimately continue in either direction to the municipalities of Châteauguay and Boucherville respectively.

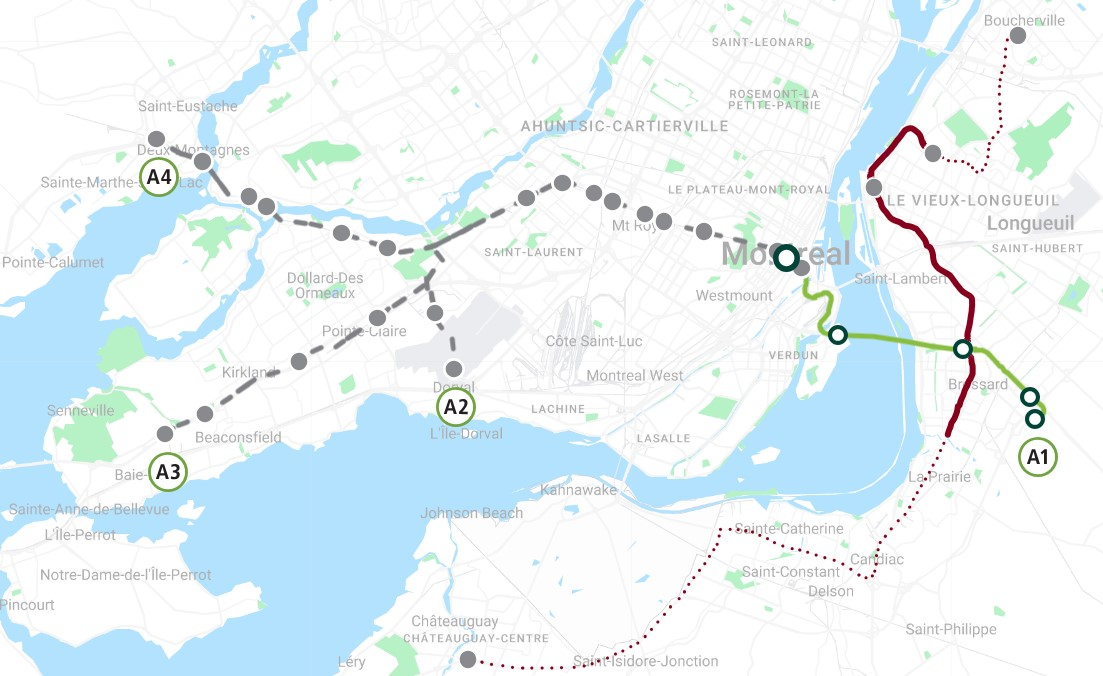
The planned route of the Réseau Express Métropolitain, with the Taschereau REM shown

Longueuil mayor Catherine Fournier was present at the REM's inauguration and first rides. During the ride, Fournier made clarifying remarks about REM 2.0, confirming the future of the project. Fournier added that the segments of REM 2.0 along Taschereau Boulevard would be elevated, while the portions along the Quebec Route 132 would be at ground level to service Old Longueuil and beyond.

Following the REM's inauguration, Fournier held an interview with La Presse where she indicated that she had taken part in continued conversation with Quebec's Minister of Transport, Geneviève Guilbault, who reiterated the province's interest in the project and stated that the extension was under study. CDPQ Infra responded to the interview, confirming that the project was still planned, with ongoing discussions involving the provincial authorities.

Following this interview, in late 2023, Mayor of Brossard Doreen Assaad announced a plan to construct a new, pedestrianized downtown for Brossard, centred on Panama station, to be completed by 2040. The announcement indicated that Brossard would aim to implement a double-track, street-level electric tram along Taschereau Boulevard. In follow-up interviews, Brossard's city administration opposed the construction of an elevated REM extension along the Taschereau corridor, indicating that it was not compatible with its vision for Brossard's new downtown.

Assaad then elaborated on this statement in a press release about road safety on Taschereau Boulevard, stating that the citizens and mayor's office did not see a return on investment for an elevated REM along Taschereau but would defer to the Government of Quebec as Taschereau Boulevard is a Quebec Route and under provincial jurisdiction. Assaad indicated that the city was designing its future downtown with a lighter mode of public transit to test the feasibility of the REM model and sought to keep the municipality's voice in the conversation.

In an early 2024 press release, CDPQ Infra said that it would be releasing the results of its analysis of the Taschereau REM branch, as well as holding meetings with municipal officials and other relevant parties to inform them of the direction of its upcoming public transit projects. In response to this announcement, Fournier commented that she was supportive of the Taschereau REM project but that Longueuil had not received an update from CDPQ Infra for over a year and a half.

On 29 January 2024, CDPQ Infra announced that it was withdrawing from the proposed extension, leaving local mayors to coordinate any future development of Taschereau Boulevard with the soon-to-be-created provincial government agency, Mobilité Infra, for large public transit projects.

On 21 July 2025, Fournier and Assaad announced that the transit corridor on Taschereau Boulevard would be a bus rapid transit (BRT) system rather than a rail system and Renée Amilcar, CEO of Mobilité Infra, confirmed that the BRT system was included in the first four projects that the newly minted government agency would tackle.

== See also ==
- Urban rail transit in Canada
