= Sunnybrooke station =

REM station in Montreal, Quebec, Canada

Sunnybrooke
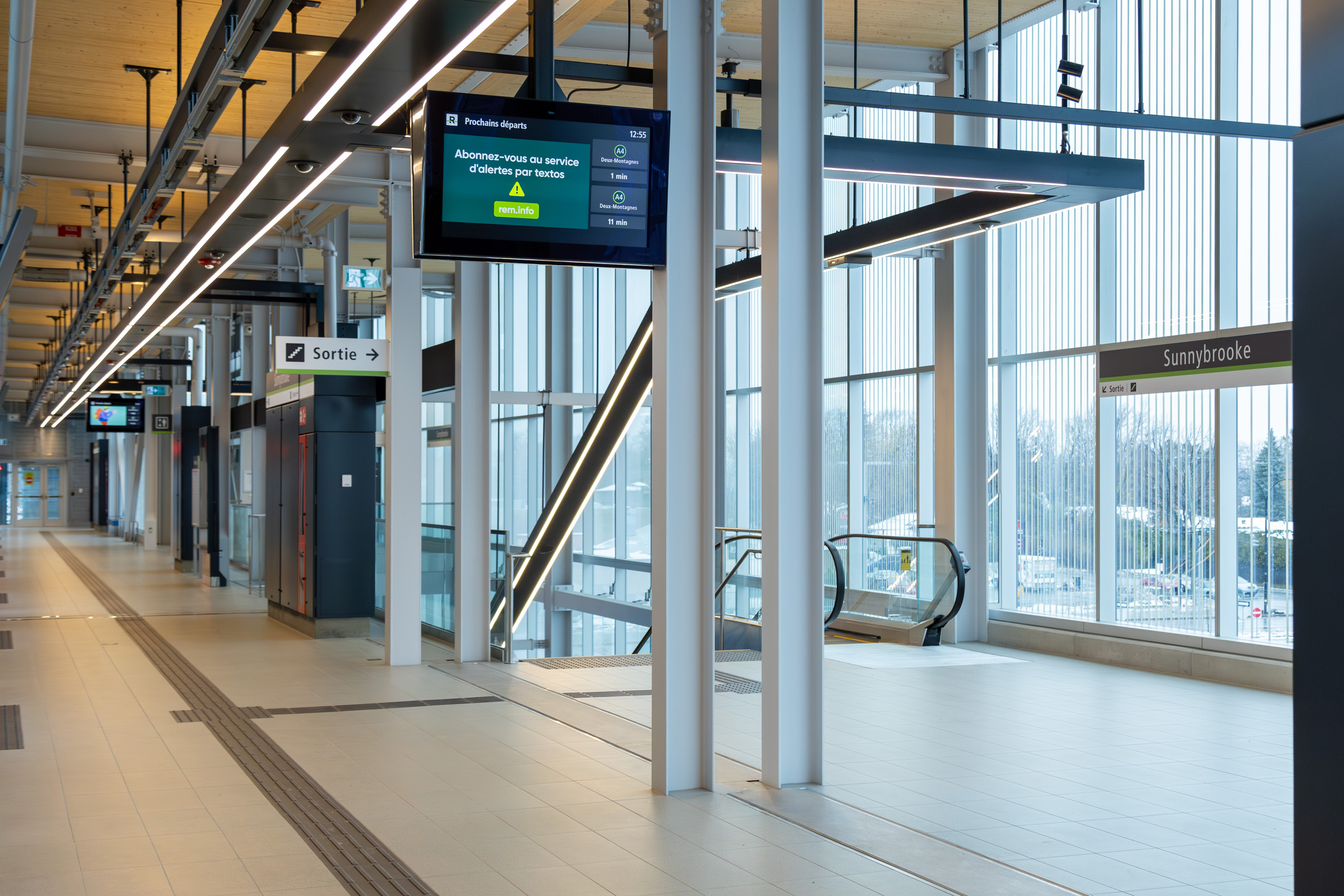
- Sunnybrooke station platform

General information
- Location: 9680 Gouin Blvd. West, Montreal, Quebec
- Coordinates: 45°30′13″N 73°47′05″W
- Operator: Pulsar (AtkinsRéalis and Alstom)
- Platforms: 2 side platforms
- Tracks: 2
- Connections: STM bus; STM taxibus

Construction
- Structure type: Embankment
- Parking: 494 spaces
- Cycle facilities: 40 spaces
- Accessible: Yes

Other information
- Station code: SUN
- Fare zone: ARTM: A
- Website: rem.info/en/travelling/stations/sunnybrooke

History
- Opened: 1994
- Closed: December 31, 2020
- Rebuilt: 17 November 2025

Passengers
- 2019: 695,700 (Exo)

Services
Preceding station	REM	Following station
Pierrefonds-Roxboro toward Deux-Montagnes	Réseau express métropolitain	Bois-Franc toward Brossard
Former services
Preceding station	Exo	Following station
Roxboro-Pierrefonds toward Deux-Montagnes	Deux-Montagnes	Bois-Franc toward Montreal
Location

Sunnybrooke is a Réseau express métropolitain station that opened on 17 November 2025. Until 2020, it was served by the Deux-Montagnes line as part of the Exo network.

== History ==
The station is located at 9680 Gouin Blvd. West, in Pierrefonds, Quebec. The station takes its name from the nearby Boulevard Sunnybrooke, which crosses the railroad at the exit of the station.

From the opening of the Deux-Montagnes Line in 1918 until the modernization of the line, which took place between 1993 and 1995, the area was served by a nearby station called A-ma-Baie, located by Alexander Blvd; near Gouin Blvd. and buses.

In May 2020, the station was closed to allow for conversion of the line to the REM.

== Connecting bus routes ==
Société de transport de Montréal
No.	Route	Connects to	Service times / notes
79	Gouin	Henri-Bourassa; Pierrefonds-Roxboro	Daily
208	Brunswick	Pierrefonds-Roxboro; Fairview-Pointe-Claire	Daily
283	Technoparc Montréal		Weekdays Only From 5:45am to 9:45am From 3:15pm to 7:15pm
356 ☾	Lachine / YUL Aéroport / Des Sources	Frontenac; Atwater; Montréal-Ouest; Du Canal; Dorval; Des Sources; Pierrefonds-Roxboro	Night service Connects to Montréal-Trudeau International Airport
382 ☾	Pierrefonds / Saint-Charles	Namur; De La Savane; Du Collège; Côte-Vertu; Bois-Franc; Pierrefonds-Roxboro; Beaconsfield	Night service
468	Express Pierrefonds / Gouin	Côte-Vertu; Pierrefonds-Roxboro	Daily
TA ♿︎	STM Transport adapté		
