= Alstom Metropolis Saint-Laurent =

Type of light metro train

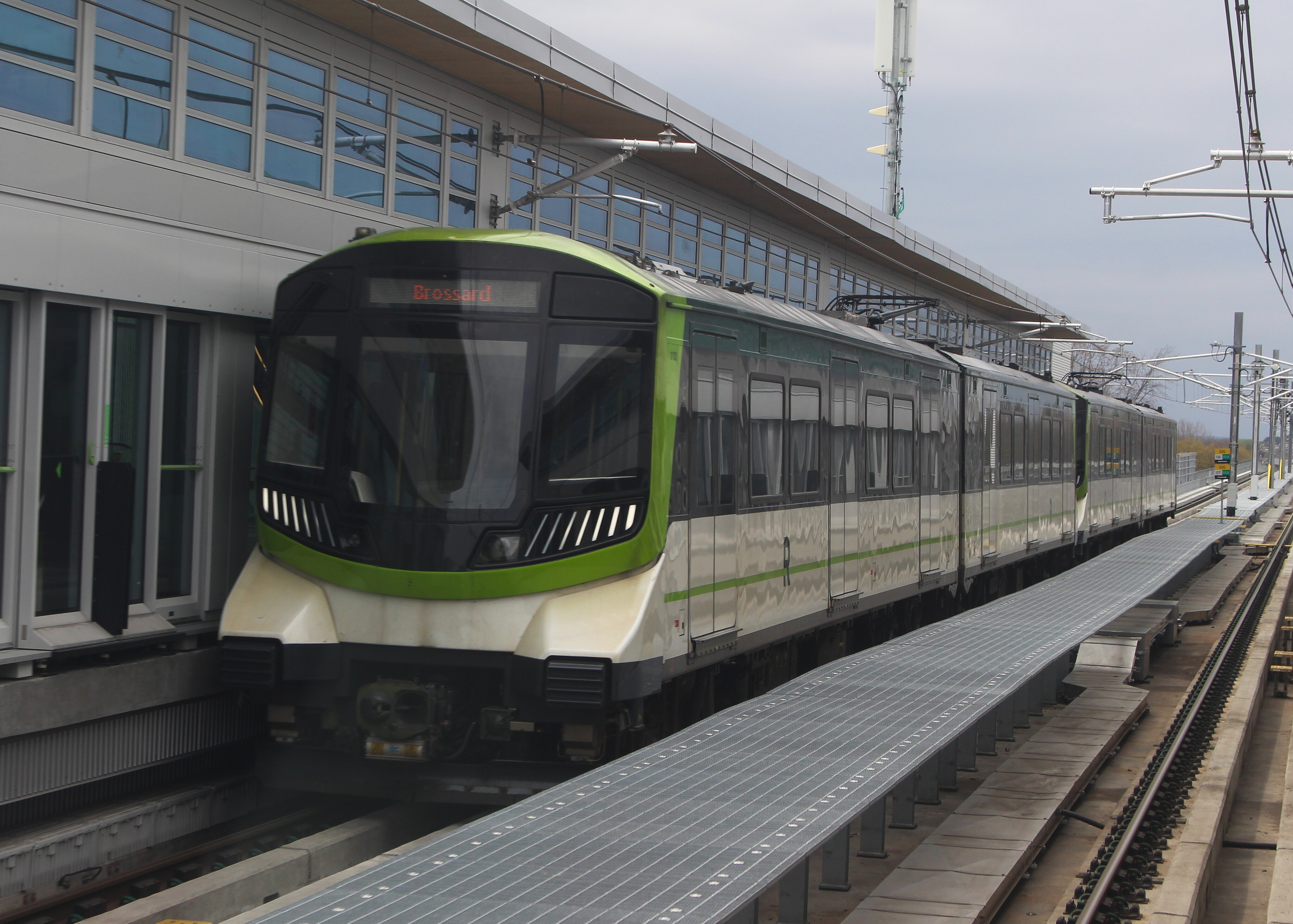
- Alstom Metropolis Saint-Laurent at Pierrefonds-Roxboro station in 2026

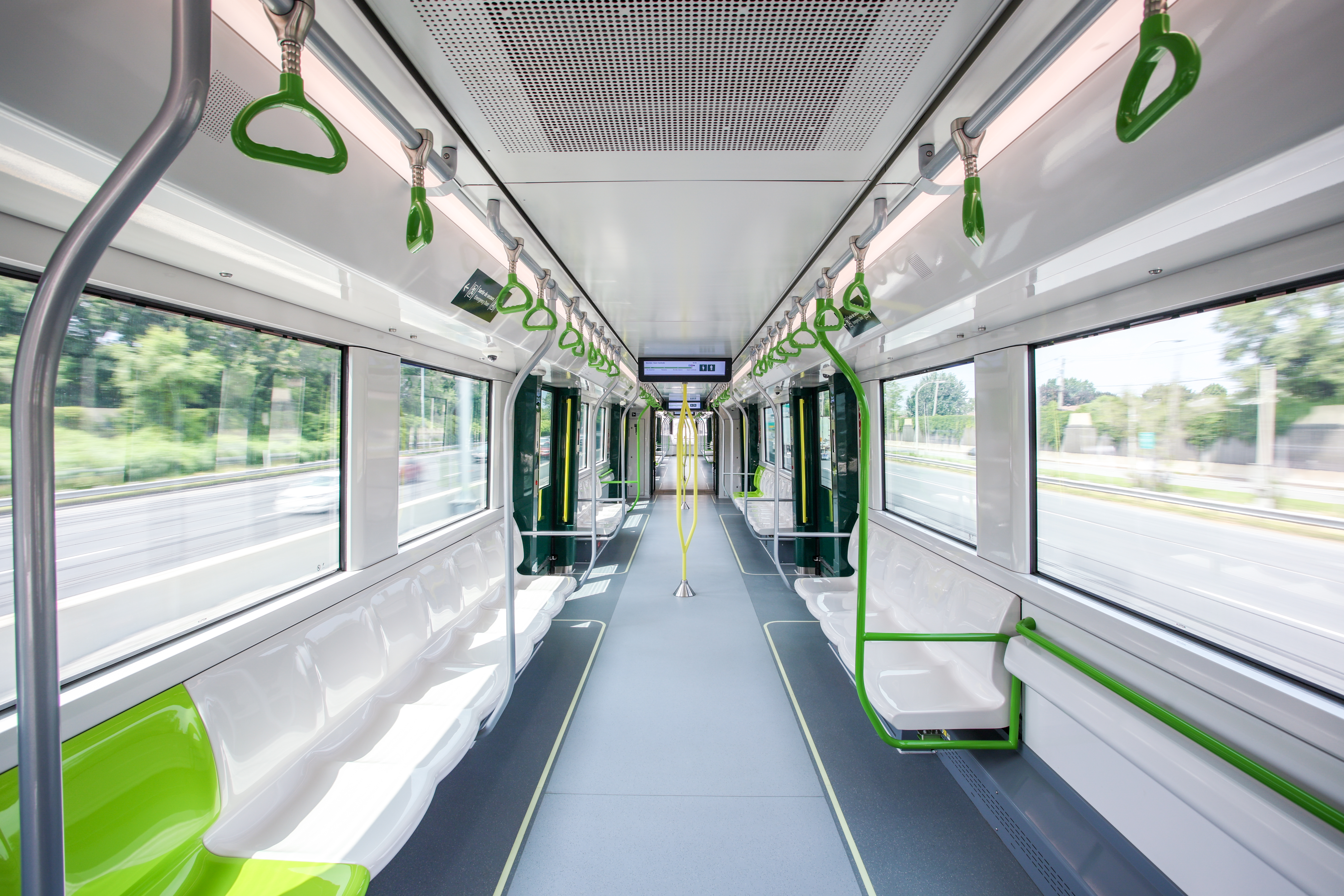
- Interior
- In service: 2023–present
- Manufacturer: Alstom
- Assembly: Sri City, Andhra Pradesh, India
- Family name: Metropolis
- Constructed: 2019–2023
- Entered service: 31 July 2023
- Number built: 212 carriages (106 units)
- Formation: 2-car units, 1–2 units per train
- Capacity: 64 seated / 390 maximum (2-car); 128 seated / 780 maximum (4-car)
- Operators: Pulsar (Alstom and AtkinsRéalis), formerly known as Groupe PMM
- Depots: Brossard; Deux-Montagnes; Anse-à-l'Orme

Specifications
- Car body construction: Stainless steel
- Train length: 38.1 m (125 ft) per unit
- Car length: 19.05 m (62 ft 6 in) over coupler faces
- Width: 2.94 m (9 ft 7 3/4 in)
- Height: 3.9 m (12 ft 9 1/2 in) (excluding pantograph)
- Doors: 3 per side, per car
- Wheel diameter: 840–770 mm (33–30 in) (new–worn)
- Wheelbase: Bogie: 2,300 mm (7 ft 6 1/2 in); 14,910 mm (48 ft 11 in) (between outer axles)
- Maximum speed: 100 km/h (62 mph) (design); 90 km/h (56 mph) (service)
- Weight: 232 t (228 long tons; 256 short tons), 2 units
- Axle load: 14.5 t (14.3 long tons; 16.0 short tons)
- Traction system: Alstom OptONIX IGBT-VVVF
- Traction motors: Alstom 4LCA 2138 (4 × 185 kW (248 hp) each)
- Power output: 740 kW (990 hp) per car; 1,480 kW (1,980 hp) per unit
- Electric systems: Overhead line, 1,500 V DC
- Current collection: Pantograph
- UIC classification: Bo′Bo′+Bo′Bo′ (one unit)
- AAR wheel arrangement: B-B+B-B (one unit)
- Bogies: Alstom B23
- Braking system: Air
- Safety system: Fully automated (GoA4) using Alstom Urbalis 400 moving block CBTC
- Coupling system: Dellner
- Seating: Longitudinal
- Track gauge: 1,435 mm (4 ft 8 1/2 in) standard gauge

The Alstom Metropolis Saint-Laurent is a type of light metro train built by Alstom for the Réseau express métropolitain (REM). Part of the Alstom Metropolis family, the initial order consisted of 106 two-car trains that were built in Sri City, India. The trains are fully automated (GoA4) with no driver or attendant on board the train. Trains run as a single two-car train at quieter times and as paired four-car trainsets during rush hour.

== History ==
=== Procurement ===
In June 2016, CDPQ Infra launched a public tender for "Rolling Stock, Systems and Operation and Maintenance Services" ("Fourniture du Matériel Roulant, de Systèmes de conduite automatique et de Services d'Exploitation et de Maintenance" (MRSEM) in French). This contract would include the delivery of rolling stock, automatic signalling, a control centre for the line, as well as operation and maintenance for a period of 30 years.

Following a pre-qualification phase, CDPQ Infra announced on 10 November 2016, that three companies and consortia could place a bid:

- Bombardier Transportation
- Alliance Montréal Mobilité (a consortium of Parsons Corporation, Hyundai Rotem, RATP Dev and Thales Canada)
- Groupe des Partenaires pour la Mobilité des Montréalais (Groupe PMM – a consortium of Alstom and SNC-Lavalin O&M).

On 8 February 2018, CDPQ Infra announced that Groupe PMM (Alstom and SNC-Lavalin O&M) had been selected for the $2.8-billion MRSEM contract, with the contract award taking place in April 2018. As part of the contract, Alstom would deliver 212 Alstom Metropolis cars, forming 106 two-car trains.

=== Design and construction ===
In 2018, a public consultation took place regarding the external design of the trains. Three designs were offered, inspired by Mount Royal, Expo 67 and the Champlain Bridge. The final design was unveiled in March 2019, with the Saint-Laurent design chosen by the public, with front lights inspired by the Champlain Bridge.

Alstom announced the trains would be manufactured at their Sri City plant in India, as manufacturing the trains in India allowed them to offer a lower price. This decision drew backlash in Quebec due to the lack of local content requirements.

The Coalition Avenir Québec (CAQ) provincial party was among those who desired at least parts of the contract to be awarded to Bombardier Transportation's factory in La Pocatière, Quebec, instead of to Alstom. Leader of CAQ François Legault criticised the government for not supporting Quebec industry, and stated that at least 25 percent of the contract should have had Quebec content, similar to provisions in Ontario. Premier Philippe Couillard argued that CDPQ Infra were awarding the contracts for the project, not the government. Alstom argued that over 65 percent of the $2.8-billion contract value would be spent in Quebec – including platform screen doors, a control centre and 30 years of operation and maintenance.

Completed cars were transported from India to the Port of New York and New Jersey by ship, then onwards to Montreal by truck, with the first arriving in October 2020. They were first unveiled in November 2020. Initial trains delivered had quality issues; however, CDPQ Infra reported by December 2021 that the issues had been resolved. By November 2021, 37 of the 106 trains had been delivered and trains were undergoing testing. As of September 2023, 87 of the 106 trains had been delivered. The final train was delivered in September 2024.

=== Entry into service ===
The Alstom Metropolis Saint-Laurent entered service on 31 July 2023, with the opening of the first five stations of the REM network. In April 2024, CDPQ Infra announced that they would run two-car trains on weekends and other off-peak periods instead of four-car trains, thereby reducing energy consumption and wear on the vehicles.

== Features ==
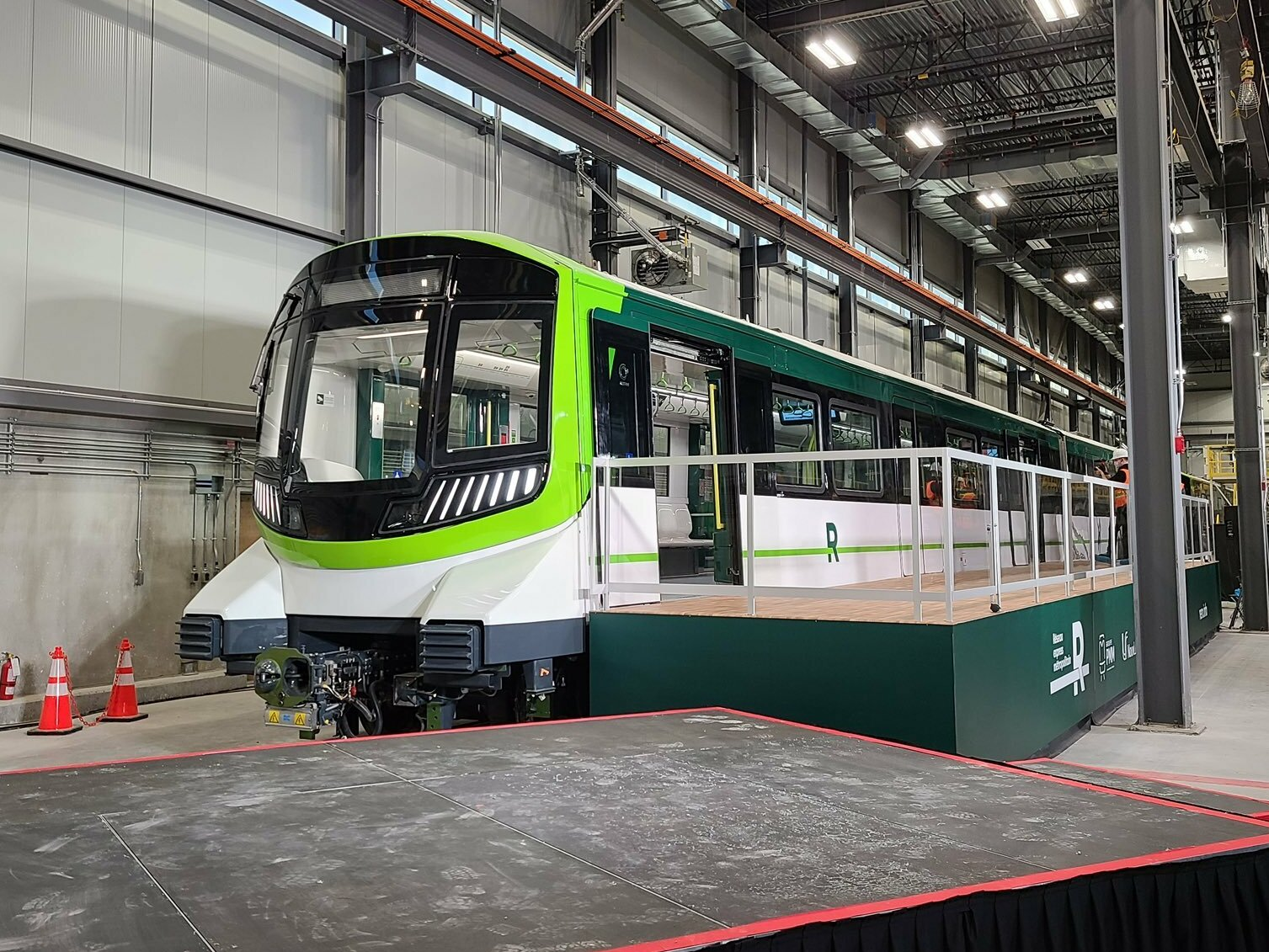
Alstom Metropolis Saint-Laurent being displayed in 2021

Each two-car train seats 64 passengers, with standing capacity for around 300. A four-car trainset can carry a maximum of 780 people at rush hour. The livery is white, grey, and bright green, matching the REM logo.

The trains have large front windows, allowing passengers to take in views from the front of the train. A dedicated space for wheelchair users is available, and the trains features WiFi, air conditioning and heated floors. CDPQ Infra indicated it is "confident that the trains ... will be able to withstand ... winter conditions", with the trains featuring double glazing, ice scraping pantographs and heated automatic couplings.

The trains use Alstom's Urbalis 400 communications-based train control signalling system that ensures trains are capable of driving and operating automatically at all times without a driver or attendant on board. The system controls doors, handles obstacle detection and deals with emergency situations.

The trains are operated and controlled at the Centre d'entretien et de contrôle du REM, close to Brossard station. The trains are also maintained at the Brossard facility. When the REM is completed, light maintenance and storage of the trains will also take place at facilities at Deux-Montagnes and Anse-à-l'Orme.

=== Comparison with Montreal Metro trains ===
Compared to the Azur trains used on the Montreal Metro, the REM trains use steel wheels rather than rubber tires, are 17 percent wider, are faster – with a top speed of 100 kilometres per hour (62 mph) on the Champlain Bridge – and are fully automated. However, the REM trains are shorter and can carry fewer passengers per trainset, although the REM has the ability to increase capacity to meet demand. The REM trains are also exposed to the weather, unlike the fully underground metro system.

== See also ==
- Media related to Alstom Metropolis (REM) at Wikimedia Commons
- Sydney Metro Metropolis Stock
