= Technoparc Montreal =

Industrial park in Montréal, Canada

Coordinates: 45°28′49″N 73°45′41″W

Technoparc Montréal
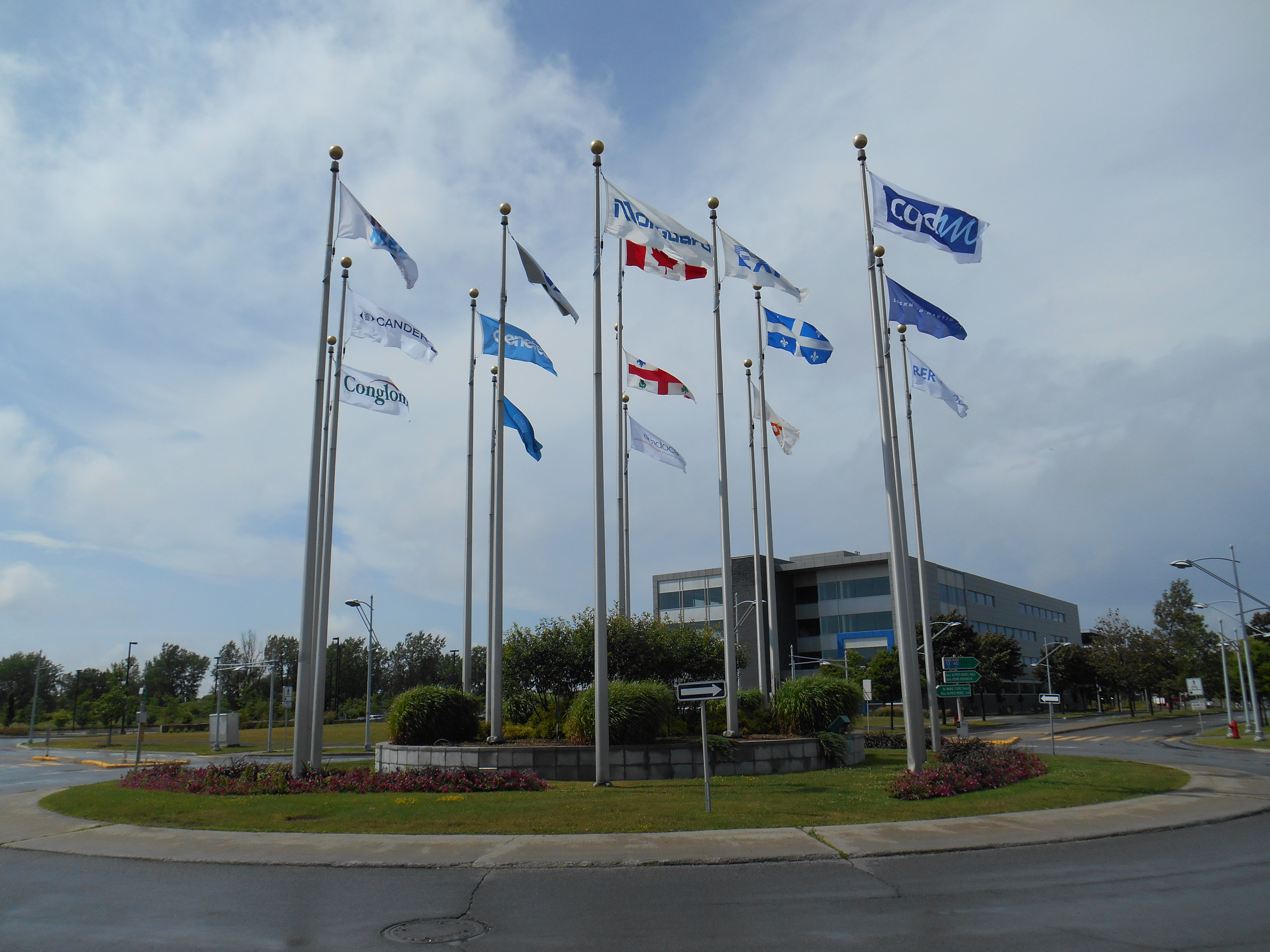
- Founded: 1987
- Headquarters: Montréal, QC
- Website: www.technoparc.com/en/

Technoparc Montréal is a hightech industrial park in Montréal. The Neomed institute is located in the Technoparc and hosts many small and medium-sized pharmaceutical research companies.

== History ==
The park was established in 1987 as Technoparc Saint-Laurent, renamed Technoparc Montréal in 2008. It includes the Place Innovation building, an Astra Pharma research laboratory, the Neomed Institute, and the Éco-campus Hubert Reeves. In 2015, Green Cross Biotherapeutics, ABB and 4Degrées all announced plans for real estate projects in the park. REM began infrastructure work for a station in the Éco-campus Hubert Reeves in 2016.

Streets in the area are named after scientists: Frederick Banting, Marie Curie, Albert Einstein, Alexander Fleming and Alfred Nobel.

== Ecology ==
Technoparc Montréal is integrated into an ecological reserve known as the Coulée verte du ruisseau Bertrand. The reserve is a habitat for various native animal species, so development must be carefully planned in order to avoid environmental damage. The Éco-campus Hubert Reeves is the center of these attempts to create usable space for clean technology, nanotechnology and sustainable development companies in an environmentally-friendly manner.

Concerns were raised when REM began construction, as the station that was intended to provide public transport for park workers resulted in the destruction of a green heron nesting site according to TechnoparcOiseaux.

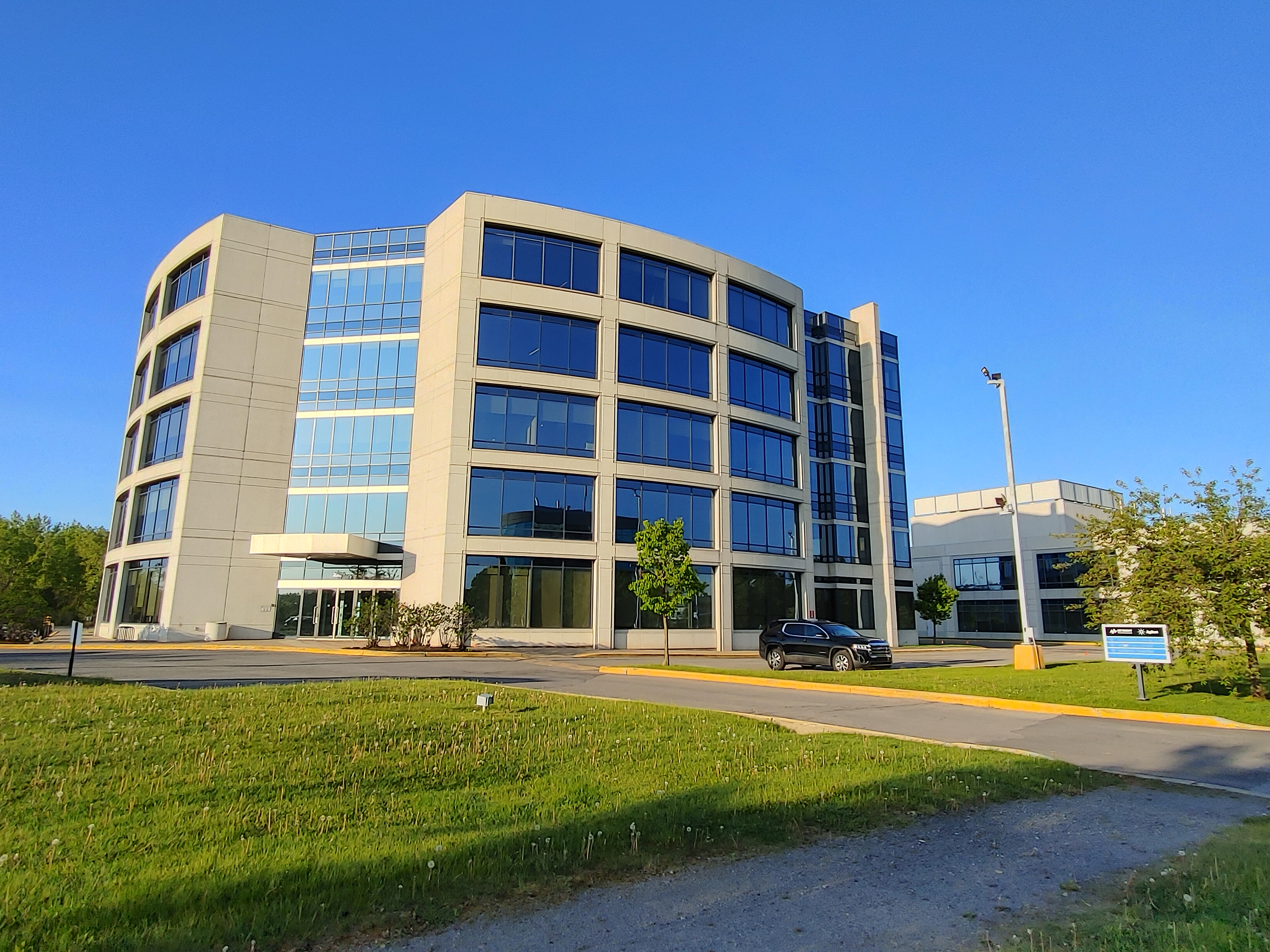
2250 Boul. Alfred-Nobel

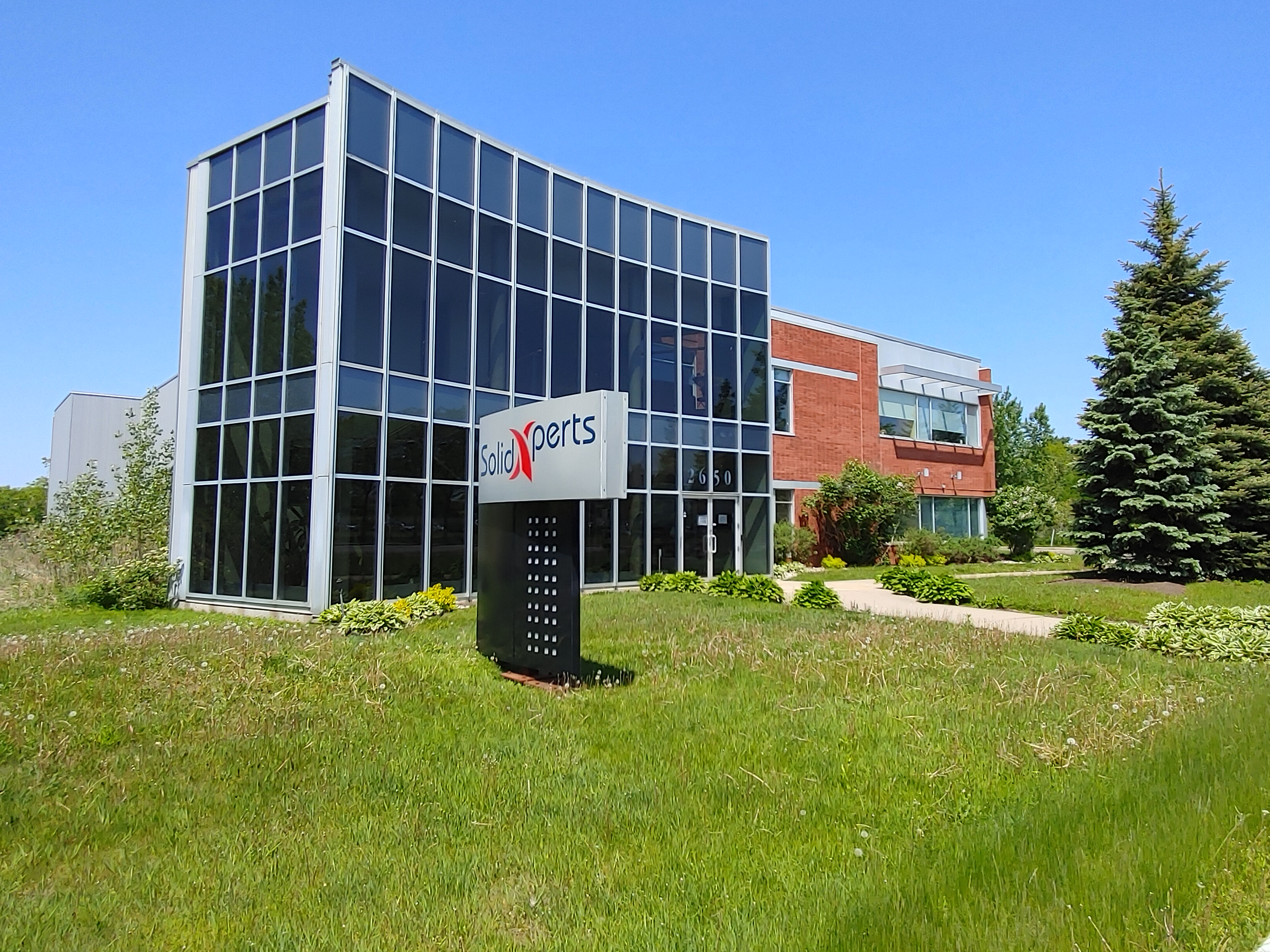
2650 avenue Marie-Curie

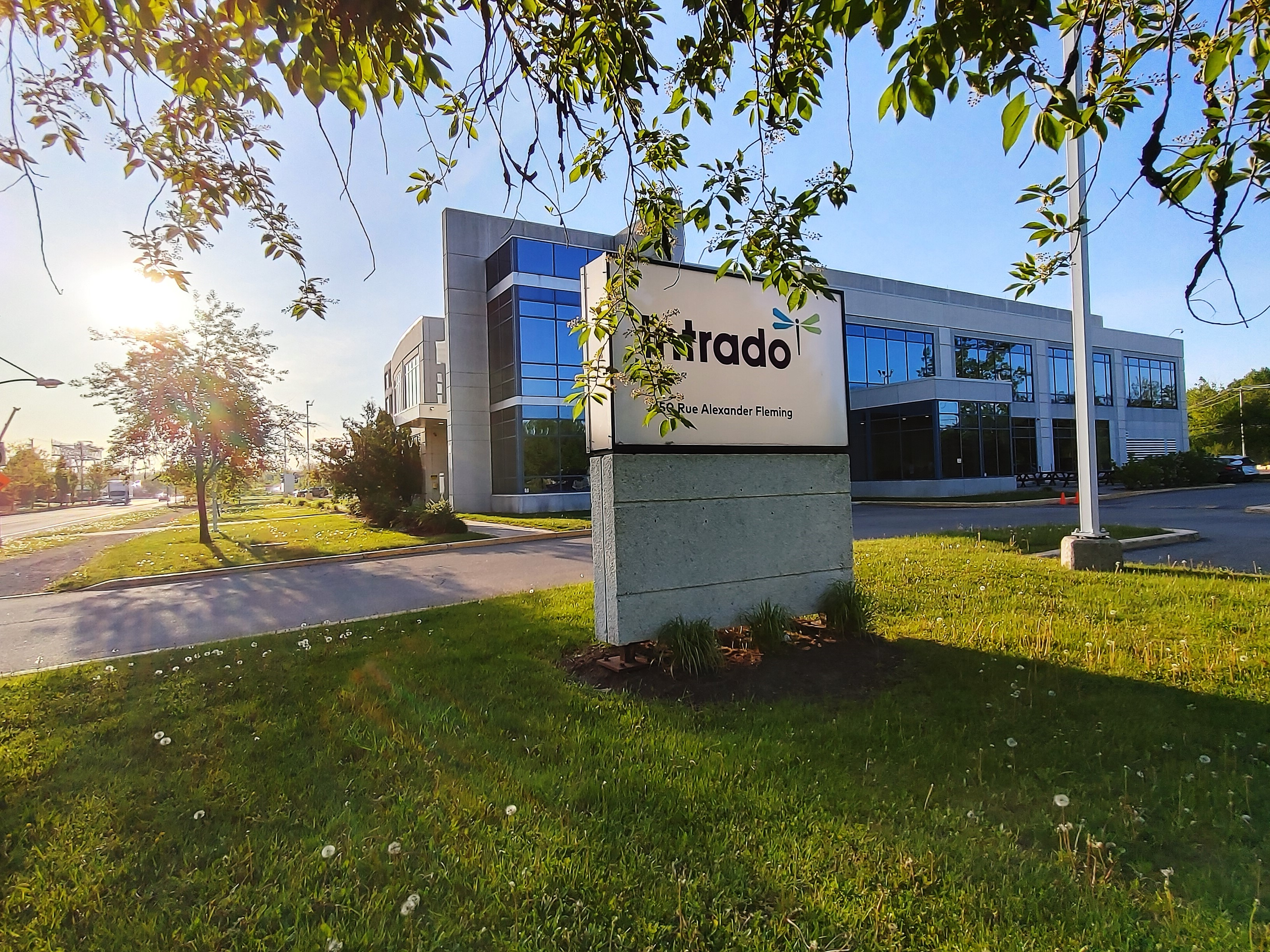
7150 rue Alexander-Fleming

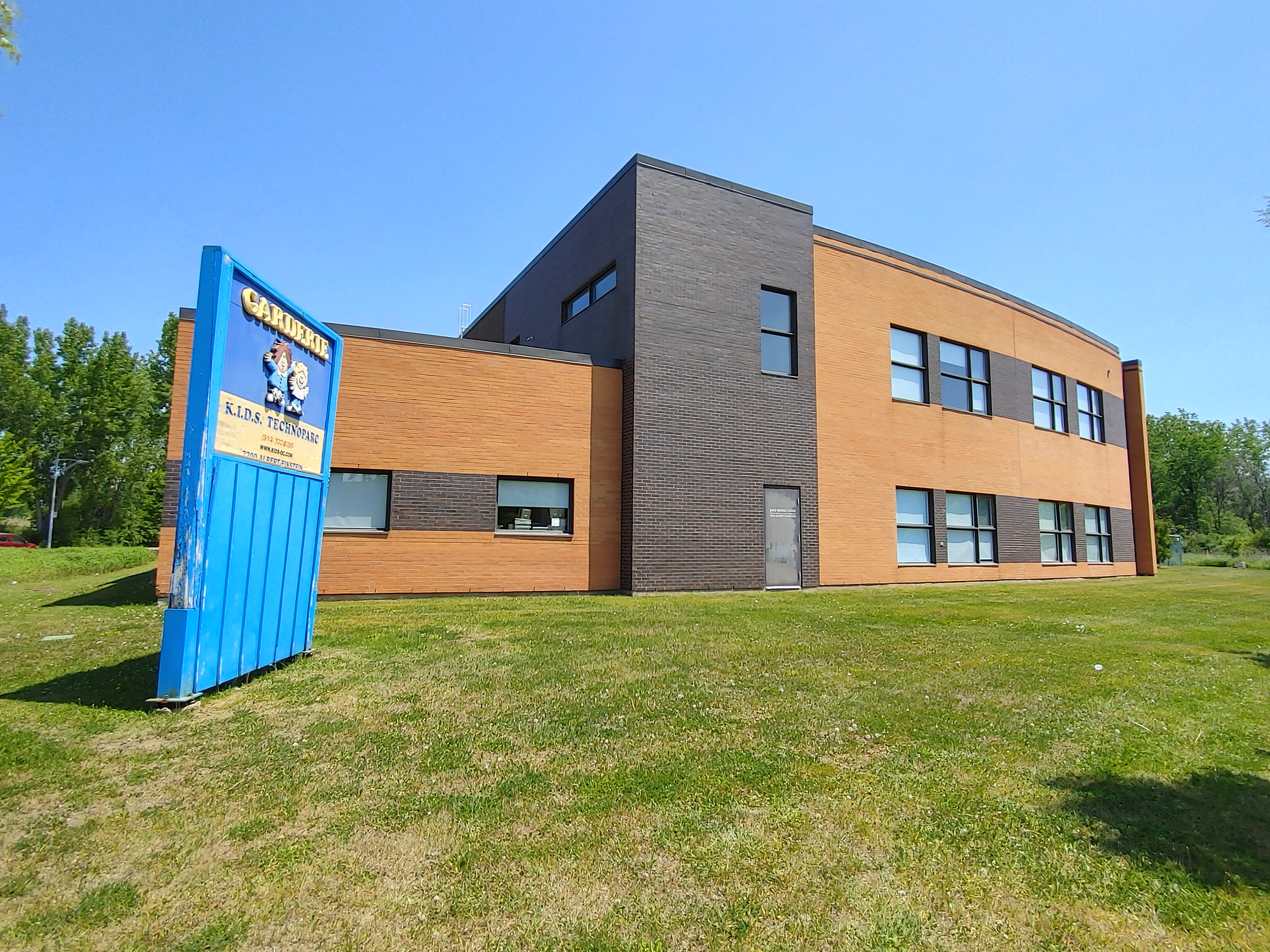
7200 rue Albert-Einstein

== Governance ==
Technoparc Montréal was a non-profit organization funded largely by an annual contribution of $2.6 million from the city of Montréal. As a publicly funded enterprise, it was subject to strict scrutiny by the government. In 2015, questions were raised concerning the governing board and CEO after Montréal's auditor general released a report citing lack of oversight and conflicts of interest. This resulted in the city disbanding the organization and governing the park directly.

== See also ==
- Parc d'entreprises de la Pointe-Saint-Charles
