= Terminus Saint-Eustache =

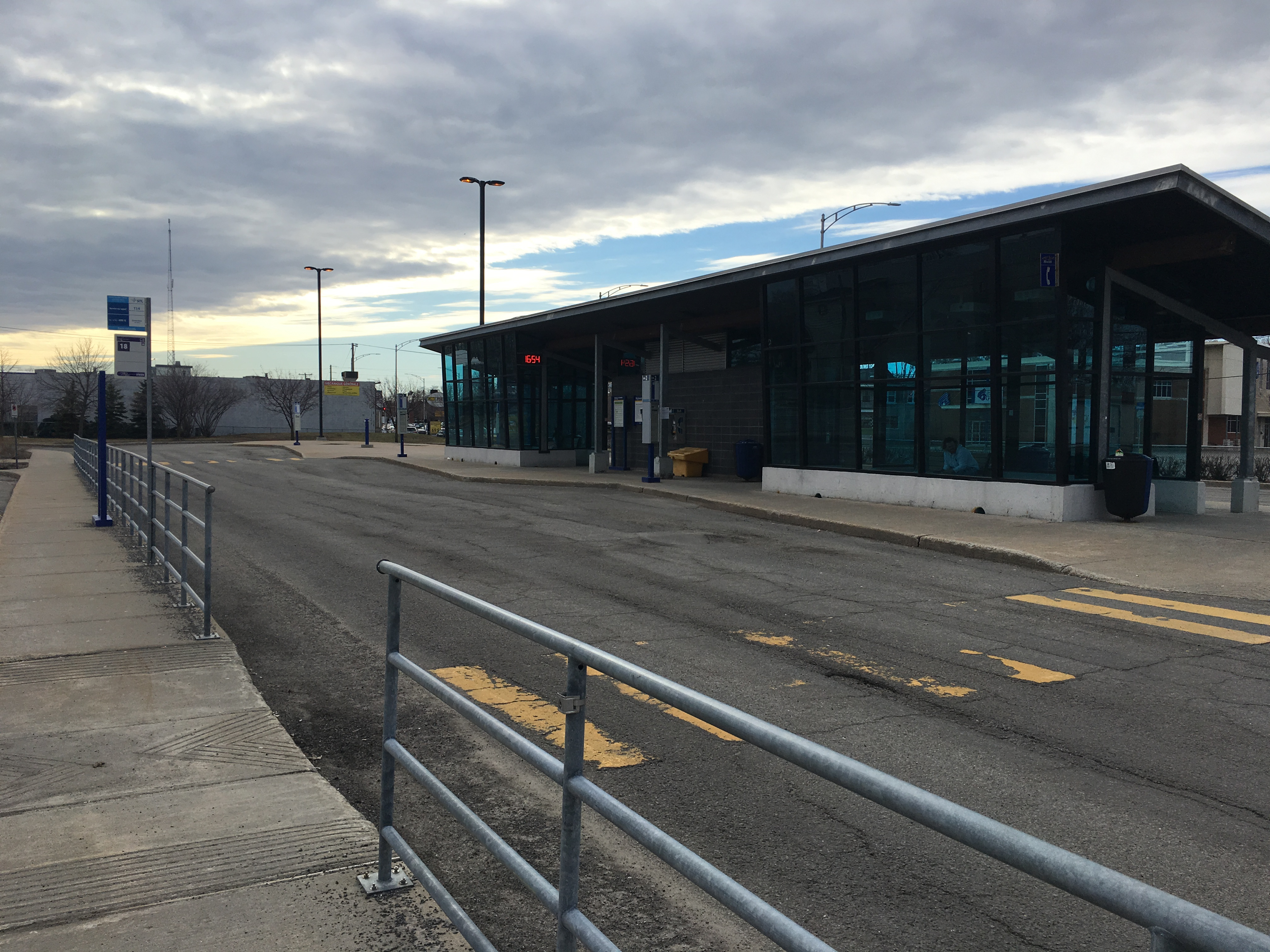

General information
- Location: 144, boulevard Arthur-Sauvé, Saint-Eustache, QC
- Coordinates: 45°33′41.5″N 73°53′34″W
- Bus stands: 8
- Bus operators: Exo bus services

Construction
- Parking: 20 places
- Cycle facilities: 30 places bicycle rack

Other information
- Fare zone: ARTM: C
- Website: Terminus Saint-Eustache

Passengers
- 2016: 490,200
Location

Terminus Saint-Eustache is a bus terminus in Saint-Eustache, Quebec served by Exo.

== Connecting bus routes ==
Exo Laurentides sector
No.	Route	Connects to	Service times / notes
225	Deux-Montagnes - Saint-Eustache (A-Sauvé)	Deux-Montagnes; Grand-Moulin	Daily
226	Deux-Montagnes - Saint-Eustache (A-Sauvé)	Deux-Montagnes; Grand-Moulin	Daily
498	Saint-Eustache - Sainte-Dorothée - Centre-ville	Deux-Montagnes; Sainte-Dorothée; Terminus Centre-Ville	Weekdays only to Saint-Eustache, daily evenings to Deux-Montagnes Rail replacement service during REM construction
708	Deux-Montagnes - Laval (Métro Montmorency)	Deux-Montagnes; Montmorency; Terminus Le Carrefour	Daily
