= Blainville station =

Railway station in Quebec, Canada

Coordinates: 45°40′20″N 73°51′57″W

Blainville
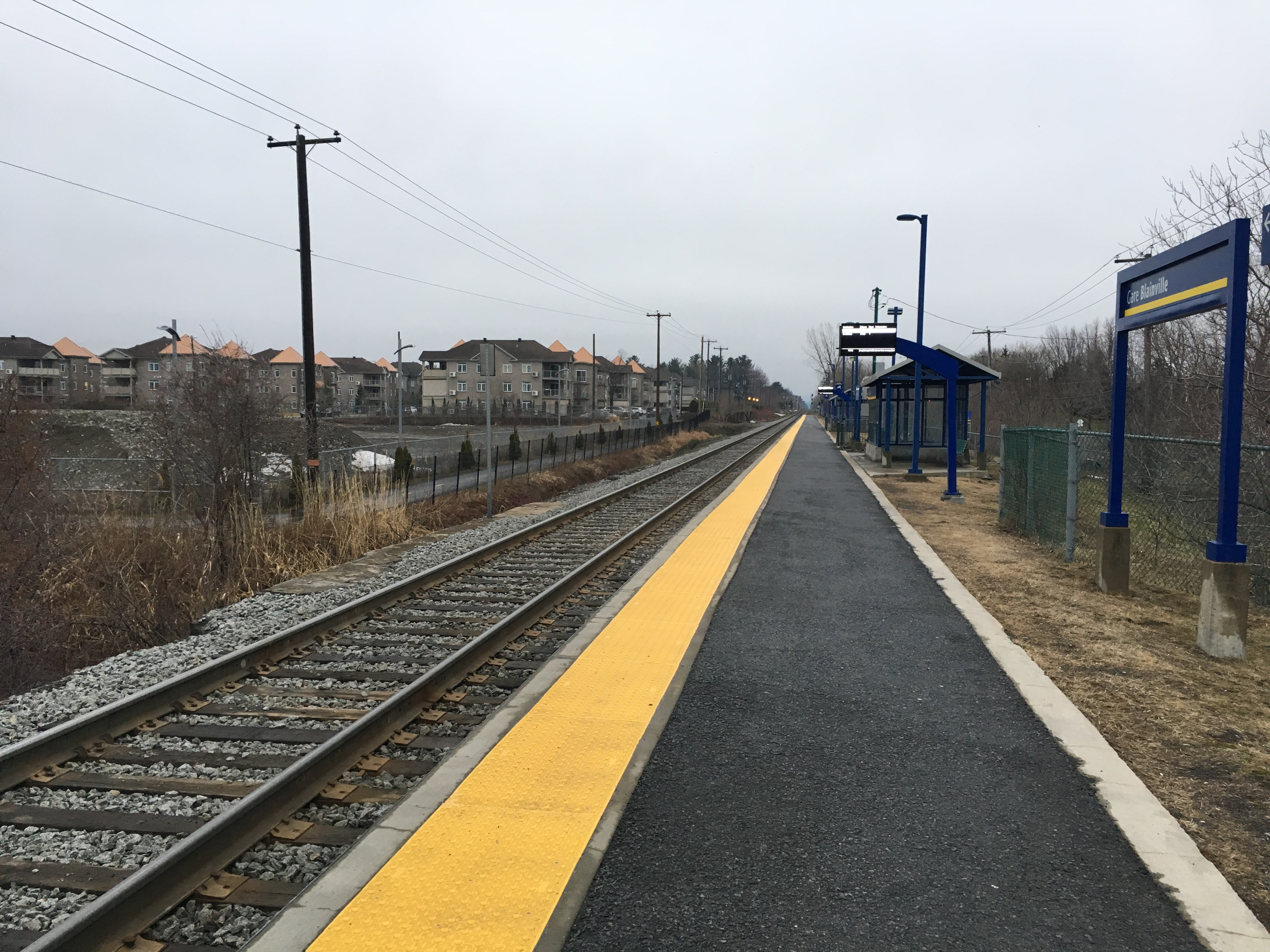

General information
- Location: 38 Seigneurie Boulevard East; Blainville, Quebec J7C 3V5
- Operator: Exo
- Platforms: 1 side platform
- Tracks: 1
- Connections: Exo bus services

Construction
- Parking: 576 spaces
- Cycle facilities: 36 spaces

Other information
- Fare zone: ARTM: C

History
- Opened: May 12, 1997

Passengers
- 2019: 551,700

Services
Preceding station	Exo	Following station
Mirabel toward Saint-Jérôme	Line 12 – Saint-Jérôme	Sainte-Thérèse toward Lucien-L'Allier
Track layout
Location

Blainville station (French pronunciation: [blɛ̃vil]) is a commuter rail station operated by Exo in Blainville, Quebec, Canada. It is served by the Saint-Jérôme line.

The station is located in ARTM fare zone C, and currently has 576 parking spaces. Prior to the reform of the ARTM's fare structure in July 2022, it was in zone 6.

== Origin of name ==
The station is named after the city of Blainville, Quebec, in which it is located.

== Location ==
The station is located at 38, boul. De la Seigneurie Est in Blainville.

== Connecting bus routes ==
Exo Laurentides sector
No.	Route	Connects to	Service times / notes
254	Gare Blainville - Blainville (East)		Weekdays only
255	Gare Blainville - Blainville (West)		Weekdays only
