= Île-Bigras station =

REM station in Laval, Quebec, Canada

Île-Bigras
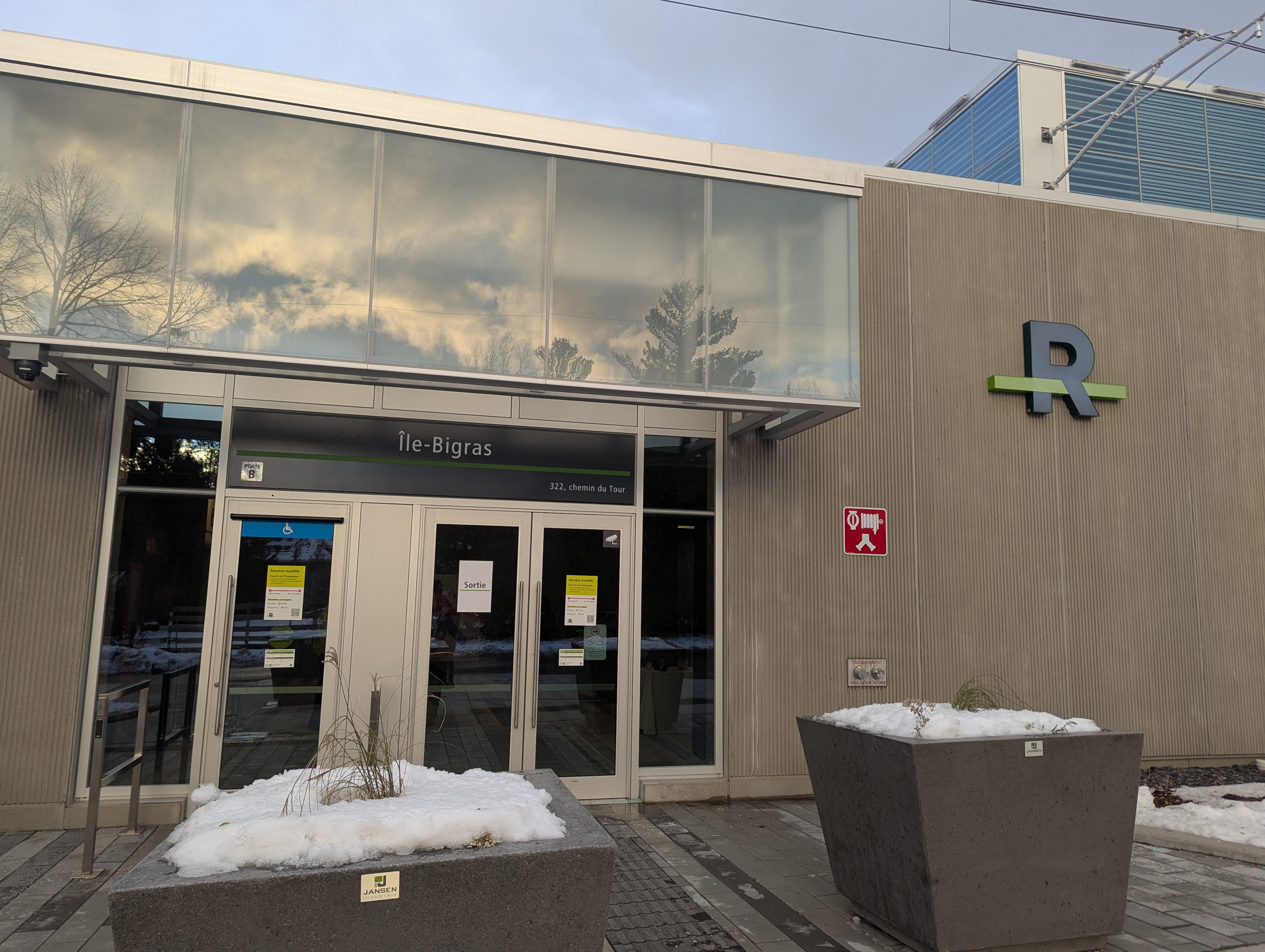
- Île-Bigras station entrance

General information
- Location: 705 Du Bois Road; Laval, Quebec
- Coordinates: 45°31′12″N 73°51′11″W
- Operator: Pulsar (AtkinsRéalis and Alstom)
- Platforms: 1 island platform
- Tracks: 2
- Connections: Société de transport de Laval

Construction
- Structure type: Embankment
- Parking: 48 spaces
- Cycle facilities: 20 spaces
- Accessible: Yes

Other information
- Station code: ILB
- Fare zone: B
- Website: Île-Bigras station (REM)

History
- Opened: 1995
- Closed: December 31, 2020
- Rebuilt: November 17, 2025

Passengers
- 2019: 138,600 (Exo)

Services
Preceding station	REM	Following station
Sainte-Dorothée toward Deux-Montagnes	Réseau express métropolitain	Pierrefonds-Roxboro toward Brossard
Former services
Preceding station	Exo	Following station
Sainte-Dorothée toward Deux-Montagnes	Deux-Montagnes	Roxboro-Pierrefonds toward Montreal
Location

Île-Bigras (Canadian French: [ilbiɡʁa, ilbiɡʁɔ]; French: [ilbiɡʁa]) is a Réseau express métropolitain (REM) station that opened on 17 November 2025. It is located on and named after Île Bigras in Laval, Quebec, Canada.

The station first opened in 1995, following the electrification of the Deux-Montagnes commuter rail line, part of the Exo network. In May 2020, the station closed as part of the conversion of the line to become part of the REM. Some residents were unhappy that a station would be provided on the island.

== Connecting bus routes ==
Société de transport de Laval
No.	Route	Connects to	Service times / notes
713	Métro Côte-Vertu - Sainte-Dorothée	Côte-Vertu; Sainte-Dorothée; Bois-Franc	Used in case of a service disruption on the REM
TA ♿︎	STL Transport adapté		

== See also ==
- Île Bigras
- List of crossings of the Rivière des Prairies
