= Saint-Martin station (Laval, Quebec) =

Former railway station in Quebec, Canada

General information
- Location: 800, boul. Saint-Martin Ouest; Laval, Quebec; Canada
- Coordinates: 45.5731°N 73.7163°W

History
- Opened: 1997
- Closed: April 2007

Former services
Preceding station	Exo	Following station
Vimont toward Saint-Jérôme	Line 12 – Saint-Jérôme	Bois-de-Boulogne toward Lucien-L'Allier
Location

Saint-Martin was a railway station on the Saint-Jérôme line at 800, boul. Saint-Martin Ouest (corner of boulevard Industriel) in Laval, Quebec, Canada. The station was one of the original four stations of the temporary Blainville line opened in 1997 to serve commuters during the construction on the Marius Dufresne Bridge. The station was closed in April 2007 with the opening of the Montreal Metro in Laval, due to its proximity to the De la Concorde station, 1.65 kilometres (1.03 mi) south. The station was located at Boulevard Saint Martin. This station had 190 parking spaces.

== History ==
Saint-Martin Junction, a former Canadian Pacific Railway station, was located further north at the point where the CP lines, now QGR lines, to Ottawa and Quebec City separated. This station was used by Via Rail until January 1990.
