= Saint-Jérôme line =

Commuter rail service in Greater Montreal, Quebec

Saint-Jérôme
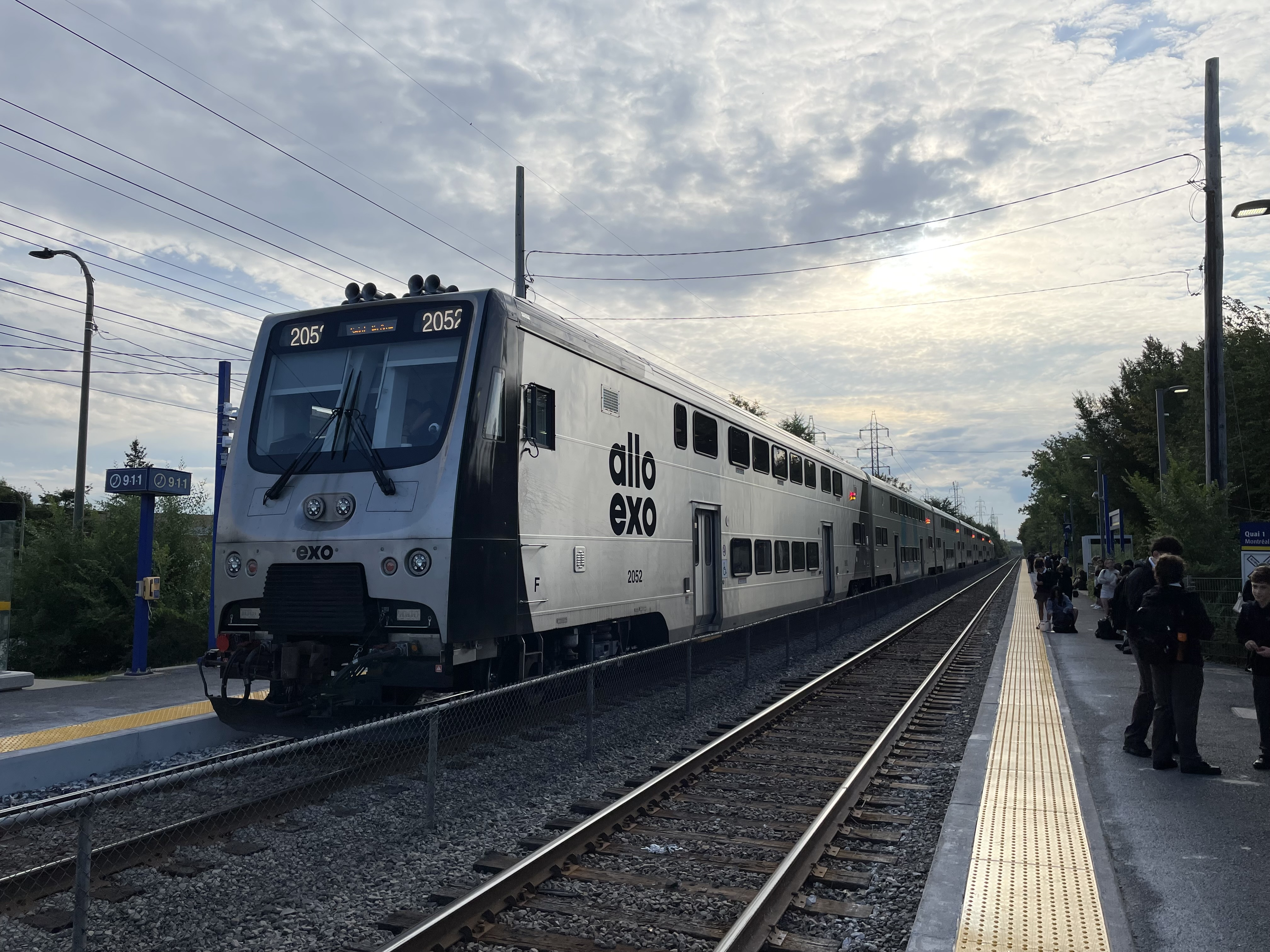
- Outbound train at Bois-de-Boulogne station

Overview
- Owner: Canadian Pacific Railway (railways between Lucien-L'Allier and Blainville); Réseau de transport métropolitain (rolling stock, and railway between Blainville and Saint-Jérôme)
- Line number: 12
- Locale: Greater Montreal
- Termini: Saint-Jérôme; De la Concorde (weekends); Parc (weekdays mid-day); Lucien-L'Allier (weekdays peak and evening)
- Stations: 14
- Website: Exo - Saint-Jérôme line

Service
- Type: Commuter rail
- System: Exo commuter rail
- Operator(s): Alstom
- Daily ridership: 10,333 (2025)
- Ridership: 2,697,086 (2025)

History
- Opened: 1882

Technical
- Line length: 62.8 km (39.0 mi)
- Track gauge: 1,435 mm (4 ft 8 1/2 in) standard gauge
- Electrification: No
- Operating speed: 60 mph (97 km/h)
Route map
Saint-Jérôme line highlighted in yellow

Saint-Jérôme (also designated line 12, formerly known as Blainville–Saint-Jérôme and Montréal–Blainville) is a commuter rail service in Greater Montreal, Quebec. It is operated by Exo, the organization that operates the commuter rail network in Greater Montreal.

The Saint-Jérôme line was operated by the Canadian Pacific Railway (CPR) between 1882 and 1981. The line was not active until Exo's predecessor agency, the Agence Métropolitaine de transport (AMT), resumed passenger service in 1997.

There are 14 inbound and 14 outbound departures each weekday. There are six departures on Saturday and Sunday, although these trains terminate at De la Concorde, with connection to the Metro, instead of continuing to Parc in the off-peak or Lucien-L'Allier in the peak.

== Overview ==
This line links the Lucien-L'Allier station in Downtown Montreal with Saint-Jérôme, on Montreal's North Shore. More than 2000 Park and Ride spaces are available for commuters.

The line offers 14 inbound and outbound trains per day on weekdays and 6 inbound and outbound trains per day on weekends and civic holidays. The frequency of service is 25–45 minutes during rush hour and every one to two hours outside of rush hour. As of January 2026, all weekday trains terminate at or originate from Lucien-L'Allier station, except for three inbound and three outbound trains daily, near mid-day, which terminate or originate at Parc. On weekends, all trains terminate and originate at De la Concorde station.

As of 2023, more than 5,700 people ride the line daily.

== History ==
=== CP Service ===
The line between Montreal and Saint-Jérôme was built in 1876 by the Quebec, Montreal, Ottawa and Occidental Railway (QMOO), which was owned by the Government of Quebec. In 1881, it was sold to Canadian Pacific along with the line on the north shore of the St. Lawrence and Ottawa rivers, between Quebec City and Ottawa. CP operated Le petit train du nord, the Ottawa train via Lachute, the Quebec train via Trois-Rivières as well as the Sainte-Thérèse RDC train along this route between 1882 and 1979. Train service to Sainte-Thérèse and Saint-Jérôme was discontinued on October 24, 1980.

Le petit train du nord formerly extended northwards beyond Saint-Jerome, into the ski hills of the Laurentian Mountains and then Mont-Laurier; this latter section was later converted into the Parc Linéaire Le P'tit Train du Nord rail trail in the 1990s.

=== AMT Service ===
The Montreal–Blainville line was originally opened in July 1997 and was supposed to serve commuters during major repair work on the Marius-Dufresne Bridge. In its early years, the AMT Blainville train was composed of a GP9 locomotive and four Canadian Vickers Gallery Cars. Although it offered only three departures per day (two peak, one reverse peak), it instantly became very successful. In 1997, there were only four stations: Blainville, Sainte-Thérèse, Saint-Martin, and Jean-Talon (now Parc). The stations were merely wooden platforms with gravel parking lots; not too much money was spent because the line was not supposed to become permanent. Service increased in September 1997 to six departures per day (four peak, two reverse peak) and stations were added at Sainte-Rose and Henri-Bourassa (now Bois-de-Boulogne): the line had become permanent. Rosemère station was built in 1998.

To make the operation successful, buses were used to carry passengers from areas around the stations in Blainville and Sainte-Thérèse. These buses came from the CIT des Basses-Laurentides (now Exo Laurentides). In Montreal, STCUM (now STM) buses were used from Jean-Talon station to downtown Montreal (Guy–Concordia metro station) (The 935 Trainbus Blainville / Centreville).

In 1999, the STCUM had problems with a number of buses in their Nova LFS fleet, pulling them off the roads completely. To cope with the situation the AMT decided to extend the service from Parc metro directly downtown to Windsor Station (now Lucien-L'Allier Terminus).

A little later, a stop was added at Vendôme station, to provide an interchange with the Montreal Metro's Orange Line.

In late 2003, a stop was added at Montréal-Ouest. Trains previously passed through the station without stopping.

Following the De la Concorde Overpass collapse in Laval in October 2006, the AMT opened the temporary station Vimont on Bellerose Boulevard in anticipation of increased ridership. The AMT also leased eight Bombardier BiLevel Coaches and one F59PH locomotive from GO Transit to allow for additional trains in the short term. In November the highway was re-opened, and the leased train set was returned to GO Transit, but the Vimont station became a permanent stop on the line.

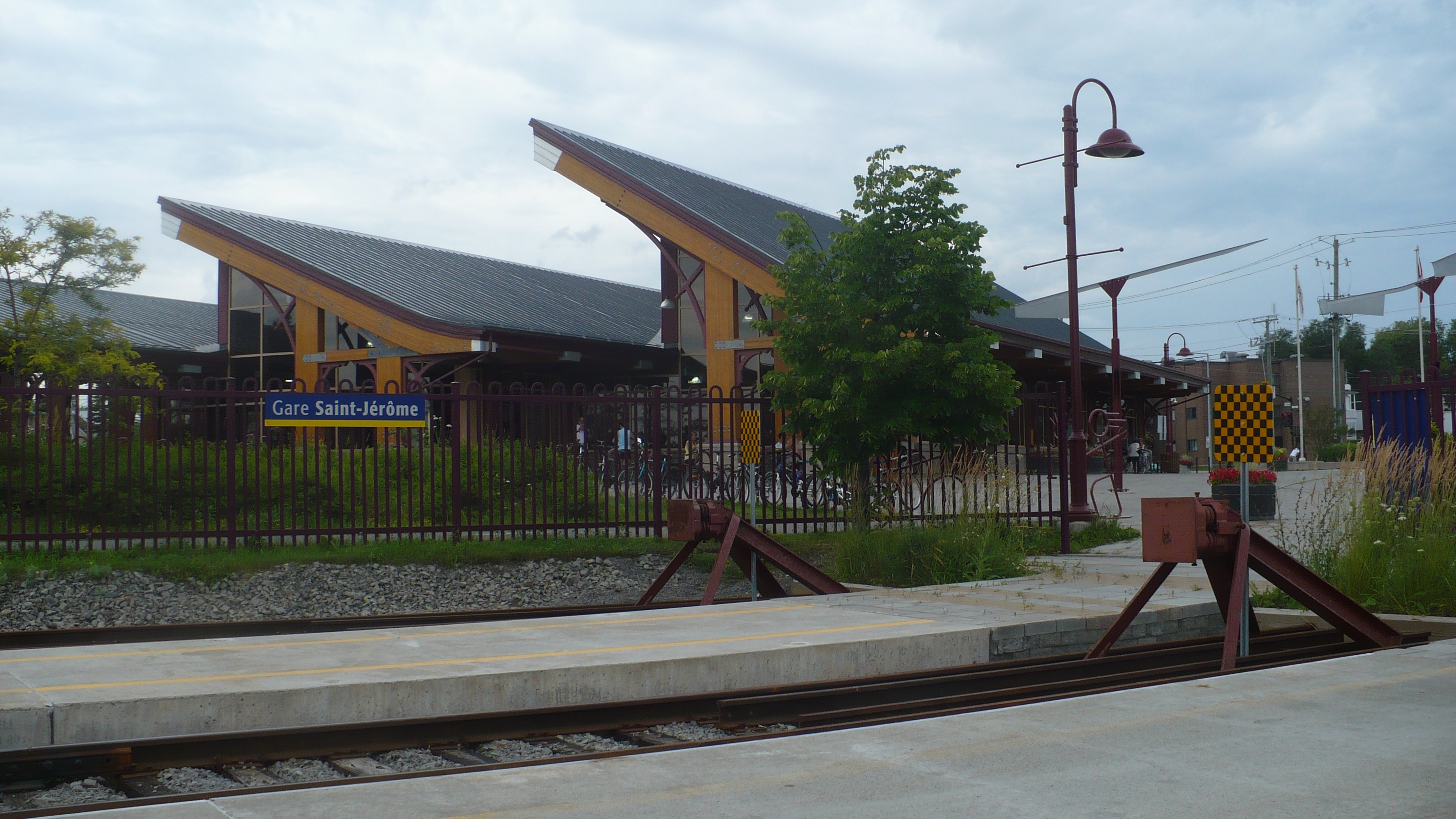
End of the line at Saint-Jérôme

On January 8, 2007, the line was extended from Blainville to Saint-Jérôme, the new Chabanel station was also opened, and a new schedule was released. As a result, only 10 round trips were made per day, instead of 11.

On April 28, 2007, along with the opening of the Orange Line's extension to Laval, the De la Concorde station was opened. The Saint-Martin station was closed because of its proximity to De la Concorde.

In 2013, work was completed to double the track between Sainte-Rose station and Saint-Martin Junction and install Automatic Train Control (ATC) between Parc station and the end of the line in Saint-Jérôme. The $50-million project allowed for the addition of six weekday departures on August 5, 2013.

=== RTM/Exo service ===
On June 1, 2017, the AMT was dissolved and replaced by two new governing bodies, the Autorité régionale de transport métropolitain (ARTM) and the Réseau de transport métropolitain (RTM). The RTM took over all former AMT services, including this line, and changed its name to Exo in May 2018.

Construction on a new station, Mirabel, began in 2019. Initially scheduled for completion in 2020, it was opened on January 4, 2021. This station is located between Blainville and Saint-Jérôme, and was built in order to better serve residents of the area.

In 2023, the service was renumbered to from exo2 to line 12 in order to be unique within the Montreal rail network. The line colour was also changed from pastel green to yellow, to avoid confusion with the Réseau express métropolitain.

== Future projects ==
The ARTM is currently considering the following future projects:

- The ARTM is planning a station in Outremont at the current site of the Outremont Yards. The Université de Montréal purchased the land and plans to convert the rail yards into a new campus in Montréal. The project is currently under study by the City of Montréal and the ARTM. No timeline has been given.
- The ARTM is studying improving access to its Blainville and Sainte-Thérèse train stations as well as doubling the railway between Sainte-Rose and Sainte-Thérèse, which includes work to double the track over a bridge.

== Stations ==
There are 14 stations on the Saint-Jérôme Line:

Station	Location	Connections	Zones
Saint-Jérôme	Saint-Jérôme	Exo: 231, 232, 233, 234, 235, 236, 237, 238, 239, 709; Transport MRC de Joliette: 35; Intercity buses from Groupe Galland, Autobus Maheux and Transport Adapté et Collectif des Laurentides (TACL)	C
Mirabel	Mirabel	None	C
Blainville	Blainville	Exo: 254, 255	C
Sainte-Thérèse	Sainte-Thérèse	Exo: 240, 241, 242, 243, 246, 247, 249, 250, 251, 252, 405, 600, 605, 610, 709	C
Rosemère	Rosemère	Exo: 248, 253, 610	C
Sainte-Rose	Sainte-Rose, Laval	Société de transport de Laval: 63, 65, 73	B
Vimont	Vimont, Laval	Société de transport de Laval: 27, 45, 48, 345	B
De la Concorde	Laval-des-Rapides, Laval	De la Concorde Metro station Buses	B
Bois-de-Boulogne	Ahuntsic-Cartierville, Montreal	STM: 69, 164, 171, 180, 380	A
Chabanel	Ahuntsic-Cartierville, Montreal	STM: 20, 54, 140	A
Parc	Villeray–Saint-Michel–Parc-Extension, Montreal	Parc Metro station Buses	A
Montréal-Ouest	Montreal West	STM: 51, 105, 123, 162, 356	A
Vendôme	Côte-des-Neiges–Notre-Dame-de-Grâce, Montreal	Vendôme Metro station Buses	A
Lucien-L'Allier	Ville-Marie, Montreal	Lucien-L'Allier Metro station Buses	A

== Notes ==
The Saint-Jérôme Line operates over the following Canadian Pacific Railway subdivisions:

Westmount Subdivision	Lucien-L'Allier	0.1	Montreal West	4.6
North Junction Lead	Montreal-West	0.0	St-Luc Jct*	2.1
Adirondack Subdivision	St-Luc Jct	45.4	Outremont*	49.1
Parc Subdivision	Outremont	4.7	Saint-Jérôme	32.9

* Saint-Luc Jct and Outremont are not passenger stops.

Exo owns the track from Blainville to Saint-Jérôme.
