= Rosemère station =

Railway station in Quebec, Canada

Rosemère
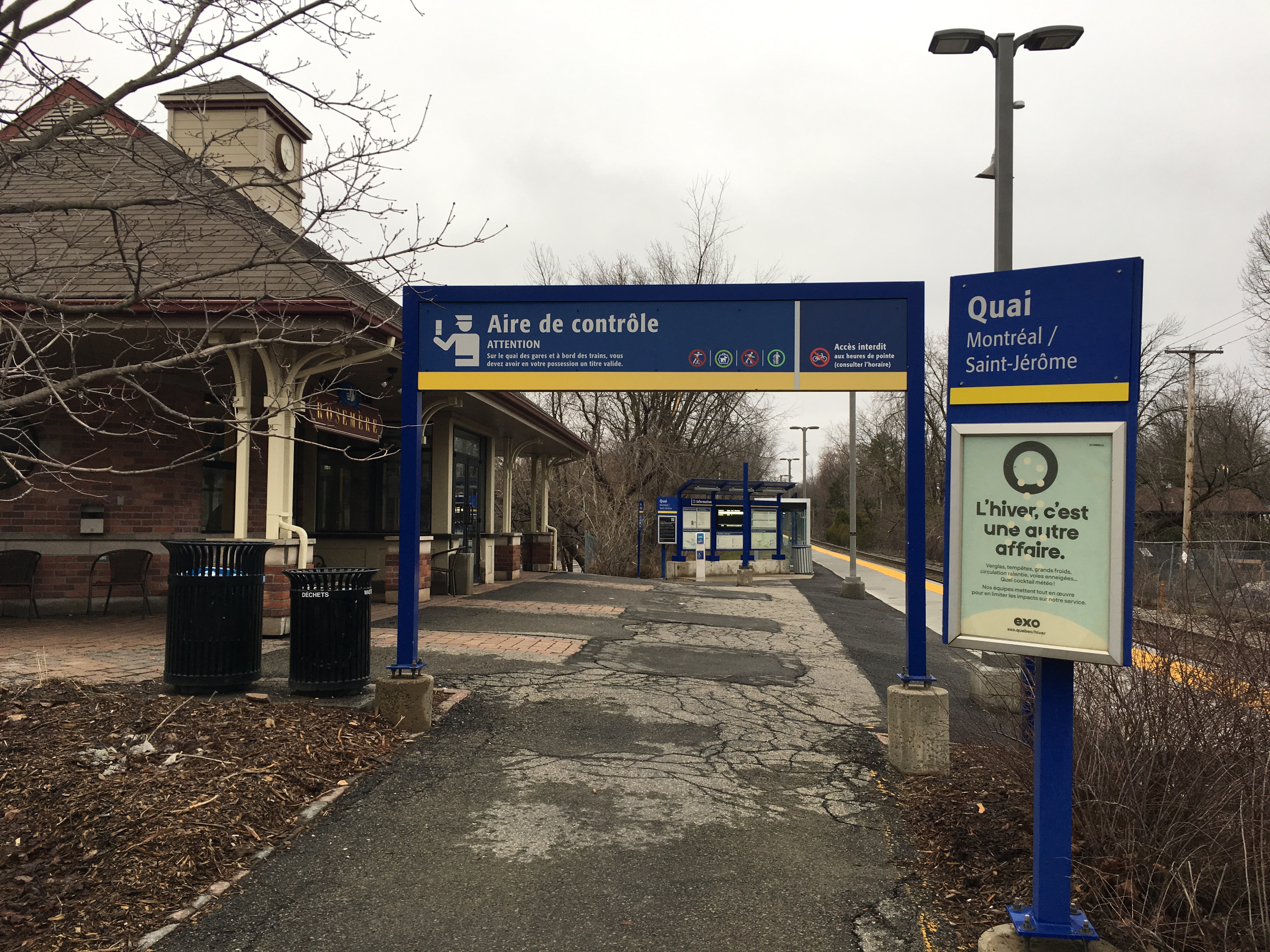

General information
- Location: 287 Grande-Côte Road; Rosemère, Quebec J7A 2S1
- Coordinates: 45°38′02″N 73°47′42″W
- Operator: Exo
- Platforms: 1 side platform
- Tracks: 1
- Connections: Exo bus services

Construction
- Parking: 382 spaces
- Cycle facilities: 43 spaces

Other information
- Fare zone: ARTM: C

Passengers
- 2019: 610,500

Services
| Preceding station | Exo | Following station |
|---|---|---|
| Sainte-Thérèse toward Saint-Jérôme | Line 12 – Saint-Jérôme | Sainte-Rose toward Lucien-L'Allier |
Former services
| Preceding station | Canadian Pacific Railway | Following station |
|---|---|---|
| Sainte-Thérèse toward Mont-Laurier | Montreal – Mont-Laurier | Sainte-Rose toward Montreal Place Viger |
Location

Rosemère station (French pronunciation: [ʁozmɛʁ]) is a commuter rail station operated by Exo in Rosemère, Quebec, Canada. It is served by the Saint-Jérôme line.

The station is located in ARTM fare zone C, and currently has 382 parking spaces. Prior to the reform of the ARTM's fare structure in July 2022, it was in zone 5.

== Connecting bus routes ==
Exo Laurentides sector
| No. | Route | Connects to | Services times / notes |
|---|---|---|---|
| 248 | Rosemère - Gare Rosemère | | Weekdays only |
| 253 | Terrebonne - Lorraine - Gare Rosemère | | Weekdays only |
| 610 | Sainte-Thérèse - Terrebonne | Terminus Terrebonne; Sainte-Thérèse | Daily |
