= Deux-Montagnes line =

Former commuter rail line in Greater Montreal

Deux-Montagnes
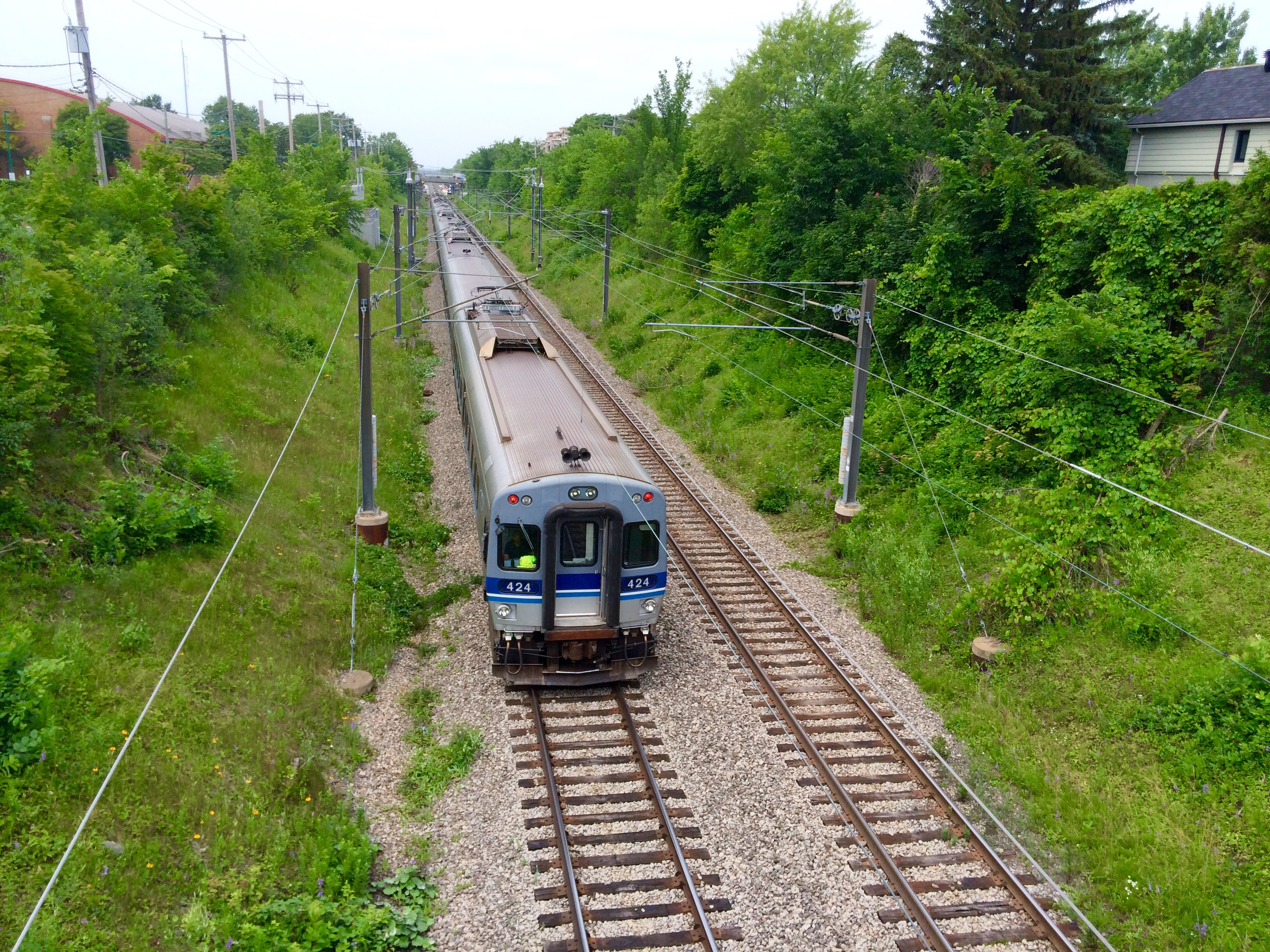
- Line portion between Canora and Mont-Royal in 2015

Overview
- Line number: 6
- Locale: Greater Montreal
- Termini: Central; Deux-Montagnes
- Stations: 12
- Website: Exo – Deux-Montagnes line

Service
- Type: Commuter rail
- System: Exo
- Operator: Bombardier
- Daily ridership: 28,015 (2018)
- Ridership: 7,284,100 (2018)

History
- Opened: 1918
- Closed: December 31, 2020

Technical
- Line length: 29.9 km (18.6 mi)
- Track gauge: 1,435 mm (4 ft 8 1/2 in) standard gauge
- Electrification: Overhead line, 25 kV 60 Hz AC
- Operating speed: 105 km/h (65 mph)
Route map

Deux-Montagnes (also designated exo6 and formerly Red Line) was an electrified commuter rail line in Greater Montreal, Quebec, Canada. It was owned by Exo, the organization that operates public transport services throughout the Montreal area.

The line was created in 1918 as a Canadian Northern Railway (CNoR) service. Canadian National Railway (CN) ran the line starting in 1923 following the merger of CNoR into CN. CN transferred the Deux-Montagnes Line to the Société de transport de la communauté urbaine de Montréal (STCUM) on July 1, 1982. The line was refurbished from 1992 to 1995. It was transferred to the RTM's predecessor agency, the Agence Métropolitaine de transport (AMT) on January 1, 1996. The RTM assumed current operation of the line upon its establishment on June 1, 2017. The RTM rebranded its commuter services "exo" in 2018.

On May 11, 2020, service between Bois-Franc and Montreal Central Station was closed due to the construction of Réseau express métropolitain (REM). On December 31, 2020, the Deux-Montagnes line closed permanently in favour of REM service which operates along the same route.

On November 17, 2025, the Deux-Montagnes branch of the REM officially opened to passenger service, replacing the Exo-6 service.

== Overview ==
This line linked Central Station in downtown Montreal with Deux-Montagnes to the northwest of the Island of Montreal.

The line offered frequent service during rush hours (10–30 minute intervals) and hourly service outside rush hours on weekdays. From April 27, 2018, weekend service on the line had been shut down. Prior, there was hourly service on weekends.

The trains were owned and managed by the RTM and were operated by Bombardier Transportation.

Deux-Montagnes, Roxboro-Pierrefonds, and Central Station were wheelchair-accessible.

In 2016, an average of 30,700 people rode this train daily, having almost as many passengers as Montreal's four other commuter railway lines combined. There were 25 inbound and 24 outbound departures each weekday.

On April 22, 2016, it was announced that the Deux-Montagnes line would be converted from commuter rail to automated light metro in 2020, as part of the Réseau express métropolitain network.

== History ==
=== CN service ===
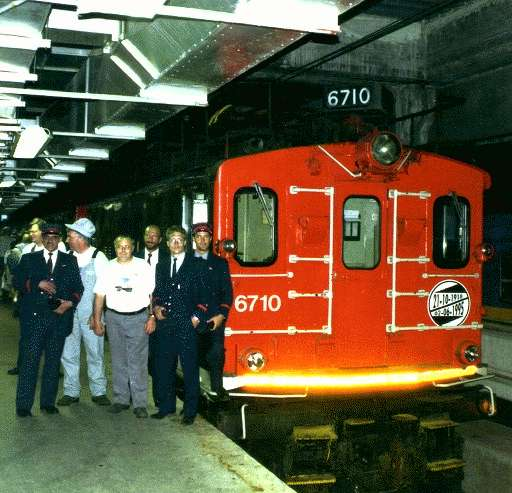
Electric Boxcab locomotive used on the Deux-Montagnes from 1918 to 1995.

The Deux-Montagnes line was built by the Canadian Northern Railway. While other railways including Canadian Pacific and Grand Trunk Railway already had prime downtown locations for their terminal stations, Canadian Northern did not, having only a station out of the way on Moreau Street in Hochelaga.

In 1910, it was decided that the best way for Canadian Northern to get downtown was to drill their way downtown — through Mont Royal. The construction started at both ends and met halfway through with only an inch difference. In 1918 the electrified (2400 V DC catenary), double-track 3.2 mi (5.15 km) tunnel was dubbed Montreal's first subway. Because the tunnel is on a steep grade and inadequately ventilated it was decided from the very beginning that the locomotives would be electric. The ventilation shaft is located SW of the intersection of Édouard-Montpetit Boulevard and Vincent-d'Indy Avenue very close to the Édouard-Montpetit metro station.

The structure gauge of the Mount Royal Tunnel limits the height of bilevel cars to 14 ft 6 in or 4.42 m.

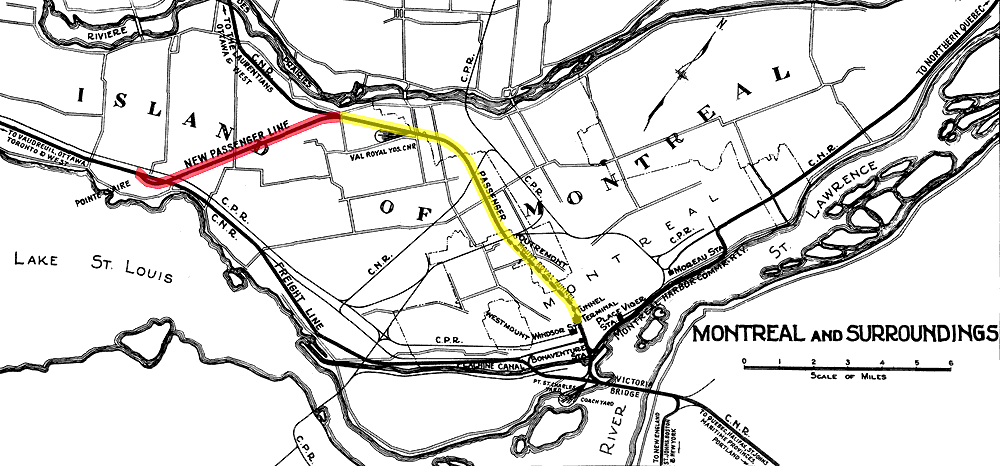
Map of 1927 of the Île de Montréal with the position of the tunnel under Mount Royal shown by dashes on the yellow line. The red line shows a proposed, but never completed, access to Central Station. This is the Doney spur

In order to finance the project, Canadian Northern built a "model city" north of the tunnel, modeled after Washington, D.C. The Town of Mount-Royal has grown to be an upper-income neighbourhood today. Construction began in 1912 and finished in 1918, opening to little celebration in the midsts of the Spanish Flu pandemic. The first train was pulled by electric locomotive #601 (retired as #6711), which left Tunnel Terminal at 8:30 a.m. on October 21, 1918. For the first three years of operation the commuter line ended at Bois-Franc station (then Lazard) before a short spur was built in 1921 creating Cartierville station to allow better operations. The station would stay a terminal for a large part of the line services until the end of the CN era. In 1923 the Canadian Northern Railway went bankrupt and was absorbed into what is now Canadian National. In 1925 commuter service was finally extended to Deux-Montagnes. Tunnel Terminal was replaced by Central Station in 1943. In 1946 commuter service through the tunnel peaked at 73 trains per day per direction, though a large part of those were on the Montreal North line or terminated at Cartierville station and not Deux-Montagnes. CN added electric multiple units from Canadian Car and Foundry in 1952.

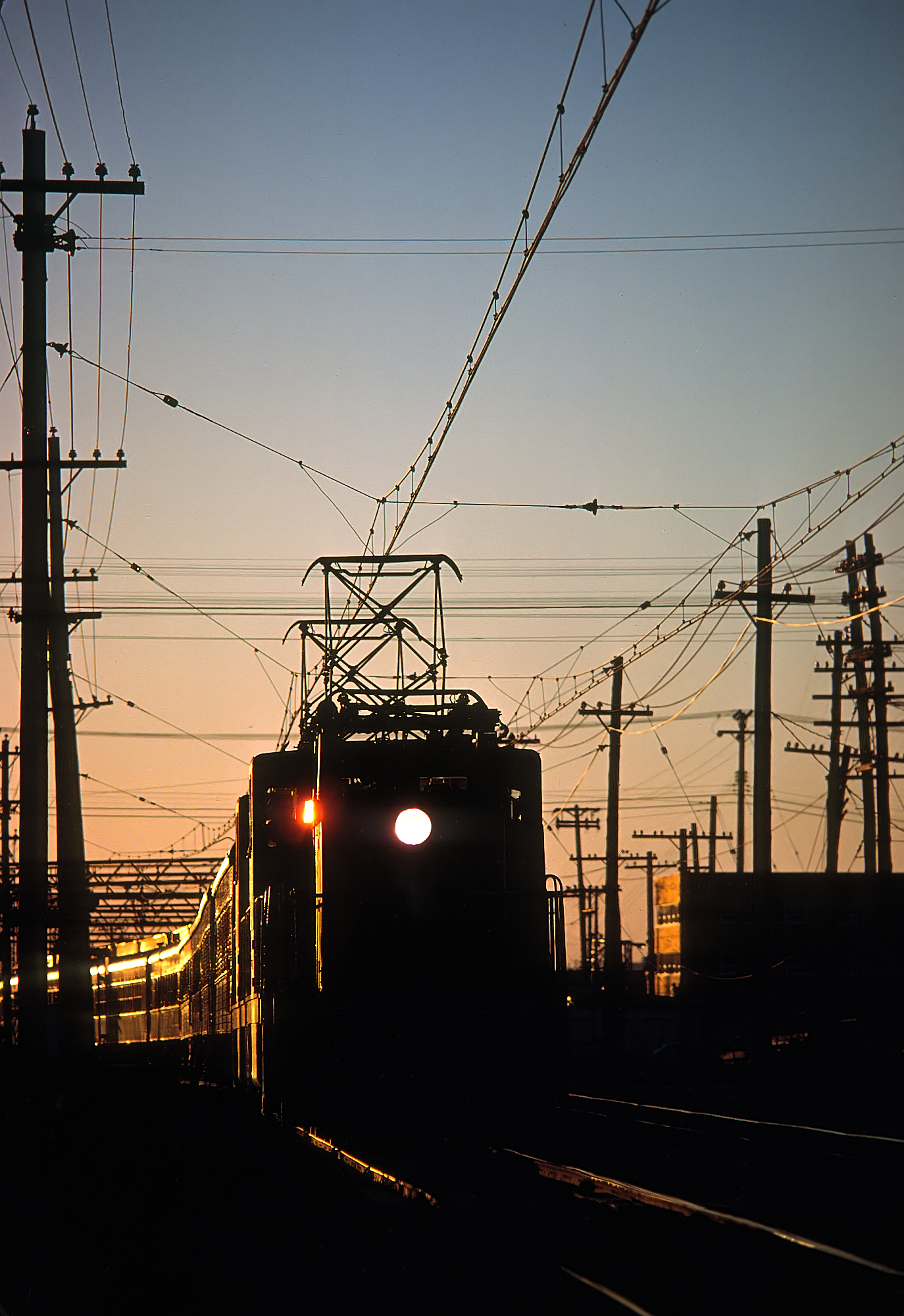
An Electric Steeplecab (Z5-a Class) locomotive hauling CN Heavyweight coaches in September 1979.

In the 1960s, the first plans were announced to renovate the line, whose equipment was 40 years old at the time. First, it was to become metro Line 3 (red), but plans were shelved because of the importance to build Line 4 (yellow) for service to Expo 67. After a ridership peak of 9 million in 1966, ageing equipment, and sharply declining ridership meant the line became unprofitable for CN in the late 60s. CN attempted to close the line in the 1970s, but their proposals were rejected. The Quebec Ministry of Transport considered using the line for a high-speed connection to Mirabel Airport (Transport rapide régional aéroportuaire Montréal Mirabel, 1974) or as the first line of a BART-style regional metro system (Réseau express de Montréal, 1977; Métro régional, 1979). None of these projects progressed beyond the planning stage.

=== STCUM and AMT service ===
In 1982, management of commuter trains was transferred to the publicly owned Montreal Urban Community Transit Commission (STCUM). The STCUM set fares and schedules, while the Canadian National retained ownership of the equipment (passenger cars and locomotives). CN continued to provide the tracks, stations, storage, maintenance, and train crews needed to keep the line running. For Montreal commuters, the transfer of ownership was positive as the trains were integrated into the bus and metro system, and frequency were increased from 18 departures a day under CN to 28. The change allowed the line ridership to rebound, from a low of 2 million in 1980 to 3.5 million the following year, stabilizing just under 4 by the end of the decade.

In 1992, the government of Quebec announced a modernisation plan for the line which would include electrifying the entire line at 25 kV AC (and converting the existing catenary in the Mont-Royal Tunnel to this voltage), 58 state-of-the-art MR-90 electric multiple unit trains built by Bombardier Transportation, new tracks, and centralised traffic control. Service was shut down completely in the summers of 1993, 1994 and 1995 to allow for major work to be done. The last of the old rolling stock left Central Station at 6:30 p.m. on June 2, 1995 – 76 years, 8 months, 11 days, and ten hours after it first went into service. The same locomotive, #6711 (with #6710 (pictured)), hauled the last train through the tunnel.

The line was transferred to the former Agence métropolitaine de transport (AMT) on January 1, 1996.

Eliminating the long-standing East Junction level crossing, CN built a railway overpass to route its Saint-Laurent subdivision over the commuter train line just south of Montpellier station. The overpass was a prerequisite for increasing commuter train frequencies on the Deux-Montagnes line as well as the commissioning of the Mascouche line. The $60 million project was begun in 2010 and was completed by the end of 2013, when the new line also was commissioned.

On February 28, 2014, the AMT announced that it had purchased the Deux-Montagnes line from CN for a sum of $92 million. While CN owned the line, freight trains could use it within two time windows: during the day from 08:30 to 15:30 and during the night from 20:30 to 05:30. Purchasing the line allowed AMT to give commuter trains priority all day, between 05:30 and 20:30. This gave the AMT flexibility for scheduling trains and allows it to save rent money in the long term.

=== Exo service ===
On June 1, 2017, the AMT was dissolved and replaced by two new governing bodies, the Autorité régionale de transport métropolitain (ARTM) and the Réseau de transport métropolitain (RTM). The RTM took over all former AMT services, including this line.

In May 2018, the RTM formally re-branded itself as Exo; and renamed each line with a number and updated colour. The Deux-Montagnes line became Exo 6, and the blue line colour was updated to a light peach colour.

== Projects before conversion ==
To ease overcrowding and attract new users on the Deux-Montagnes Line, the ARTM planned several projects:

- Extending the double track from its current (2020) endpoint at the Bois-Franc station to the Roxboro-Pierrefonds station in Pierrefonds-Roxboro. Work would include doubling the track over 7.5 km (4.7 mi) parallel to the existing track, rebuilding a small bridge, building a new overpass over the bike path through Bois-de-Liesse park, reconfiguring three level crossings, and adding a second platform at Sunnybrooke station. Construction was to have begun in 2013 and was to be completed by 2015 but as of 2017 work had not begun. Preliminary costs were estimated at $51 million.
- As of 2020, there was a second track from Bois-Franc to slightly past Saraguay (about halfway between Bois-Franc and Sunnybrooke at the A13), but it was not electrified and was used by CN freight trains serving industries along Doney spur.

Under the Réseau express métropolitain project, the Deux-Montagnes line was converted to driverless light metro operation and extended past Downtown and over the St-Lawrence to Brossard; two southwest branches were also added, to Montreal-Pierre Eliott Trudeau International Airport and to Sainte-Anne-de-Bellevue. To prepare for the project, service between Bois-Franc and Central Station was ended on May 11, 2020. On December 31, 2020, the rest of the Deux-Montagnes line closed permanently, six months earlier than previously anticipated due to losing more than 90% of its ridership because of the forced transfer and the COVID-19 pandemic.

== List of stations ==
The following stations were on the Deux-Montagnes line. All of these stations have been refurbished for Réseau express métropolitain service following the Deux-Montagnes line's closure.

Station	Location	Connections	Zones
Central Station	Ville-Marie, Montreal	Via Rail, Amtrak, and Downtown Terminus (Terminus RTL). Bonaventure metro station, Société de transport de Montréal (STM)	1
Canora	Côte-des-Neiges–Notre-Dame-de-Grâce, Montreal	STM 92, 160, 372	1
Mont-Royal	Mount Royal	STM 16, 119, 165, 465	1
Montpellier	Saint-Laurent, Montreal	STM 121, 128, 171, 378, 380	1
Du Ruisseau	border of Saint-Laurent and Ahuntsic-Cartierville, Montreal	STM 117, 135 STL (Laval) 55	2
Bois-Franc	Saint-Laurent, Montreal	STM 64, 164, 170, 171, 382, STL (Laval) 55	2
Sunnybrooke	Pierrefonds-Roxboro, Montreal	STM 68, 208, 213, 356, 382, 468, 968	2
Roxboro-Pierrefonds	Pierrefonds-Roxboro, Montreal	STM 68, 205, 206, 208, 209, 213, 382, 407, 468, 968	2
Île-Bigras	Île Bigras, Îles Laval, Laval	STL Taxibuses only.	3
Sainte-Dorothée	Sainte-Dorothée, Laval	STL 26, 76, 402, 404, 903	3
Grand-Moulin	Deux-Montagnes	CIT Laurentides	5
Deux-Montagnes	Deux-Montagnes	CIT Laurentides	5

== Geography ==
The Deux-Montagnes line used the former CN Deux-Montagnes Subdivision between mile 0.8 (Central Station) and 19.4 (Deux-Montagnes). The RTM owned it from 2017 to 2020.

The line ran through the Mount Royal Tunnel, to connect downtown Montreal, to the north side rail subdivision.

== See also ==
- ALP-45DP
- Canadian Northern Railway
- List of Montreal bus routes
- Line 3 Red (Montreal Metro)
- MR-90
- Réseau express métropolitain
