= Sainte-Thérèse station =

Railway station in Quebec, Canada

Sainte-Thérèse
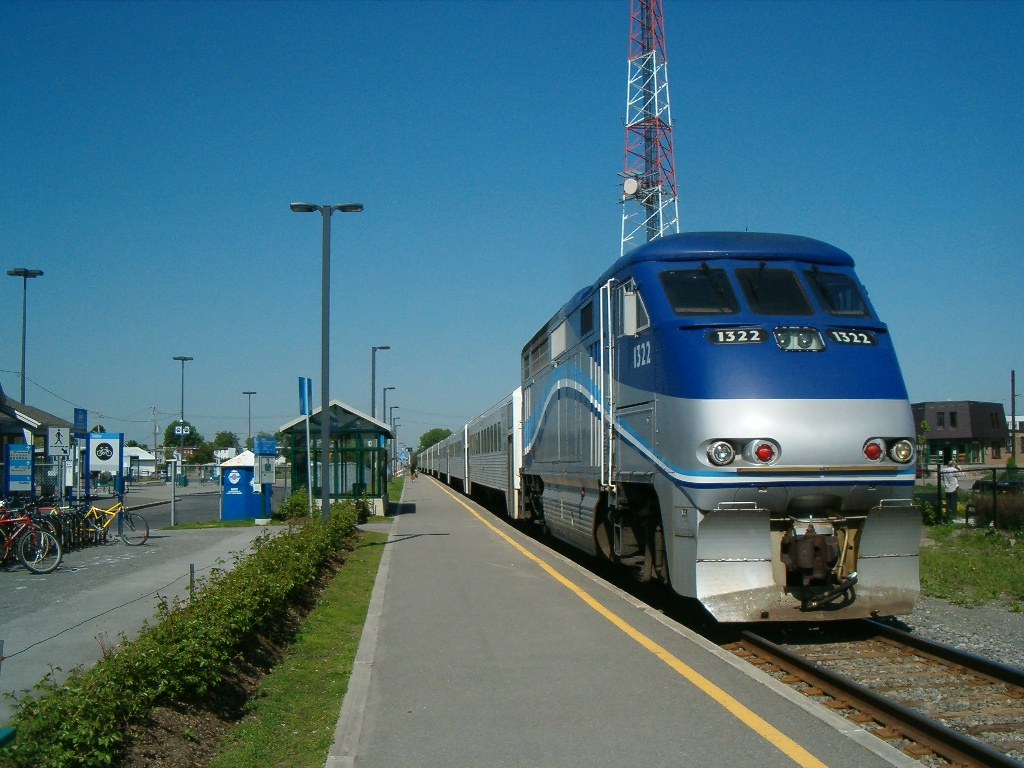

General information
- Location: 6 Station Street; Sainte-Thérèse, Quebec J7E 1G3
- Coordinates: 45°38′9″N 73°49′59″W
- Owner: City of Sainte-Thérèse
- Operator: Exo
- Platforms: 1 side platform
- Tracks: 1
- Connections: Exo bus services

Construction
- Parking: 680 spaces
- Cycle facilities: 82 spaces

Other information
- Fare zone: : C

Passengers
- 2019: 643,200 (train); 926,700 (bus terminus) (Exo)

Services
Preceding station	Exo	Following station
Blainville toward Saint-Jérôme	Line 12 – Saint-Jérôme	Rosemère toward Lucien-L'Allier
Former services
Preceding station	Canadian Pacific Railway	Following station
Saint Lin Junction toward Mont-Laurier	Montreal – Mont-Laurier	Rosemère toward Montreal Place Viger
Saint Lin Junction toward Saint-Lin	Saint-Lin branch	Terminus
Track layout
Location

Sainte-Thérèse station (French pronunciation: [sɛ̃t teʁɛz]) is a commuter rail station operated by Exo in Sainte-Thérèse, Quebec, Canada. It is served by the Saint-Jérôme line, as well as by Exo buses.

The station is located in ARTM fare zone C, and currently has 680 parking spaces. Prior to the reform of the ARTM's fare structure in July 2022, it was in zone 5.

At the time the intermodal terminal opened, it was owned by the city of Sainte-Thérèse, but operated and maintained by the former Agence Métropolitaine de transport (AMT). The RTM assumed operation on June 1, 2017. The station's design was influenced by the Pianos Lesage building, a former piano factory in Sainte-Thérèse. A farmers' market is nearby.

== Connecting bus routes ==
Exo Laurentides sector
No.	Route	Connects to	Services times / notes
240	Boisbriand North towards Boisbriand South		Weekdays only
241	Boisbriand South towards Boisbriand North		Weekdays only
242	Sainte-Thérèse - Rosemère - Laval (Sainte-Rose)		Daily
243	Saint-Augustin - Sainte-Thérèse		Weekdays only
246	Sainte-Thérèse - Blainville (Renaissance)		Weekdays only
247	Sainte-Thérèse - Blainville		Daily
249	Sainte-Thérèse - Lorraine - Terrebonne		Daily
250	Sainte-Anne-des-Plaines - Sainte-Thérèse		Daily
251	Sainte-Thérèse - Polyvalente Sainte-Thérèse		Daily
252	Sainte-Thérèse (des Milles-Îles)		Weekdays only
313	On-demand service (Boisbriand)		Weekends
405	Deux-Montagnes / Sainte-Thérèse Express	Deux-Montagnes	Weekdays, peak only
600	Deux-Montagnes - Saint-Eustache (South) - Sainte-Thérèse	Deux-Montagnes	Daily
605	Deux-Montagnes - Saint-Eustache (North) - Sainte-Thérèse	Deux-Montagnes	Weekdays, peak only
610	Sainte-Thérèse - Terrebonne	Terminus Terrebonne; Rosemère	Daily
709	Saint-Jérôme - Laval	Saint-Jérôme; Montmorency	Daily
Exo Terrebonne-Mascouche sector
No.	Route	Connects to	Services times / notes
23	Terrebonne - Sainte-Thérèse (Cégep Lionel-Groulx)	Terminus Terrebonne	Weekdays, peak only
