= Mirabel station =

Railway station in Quebec, Canada

Mirabel
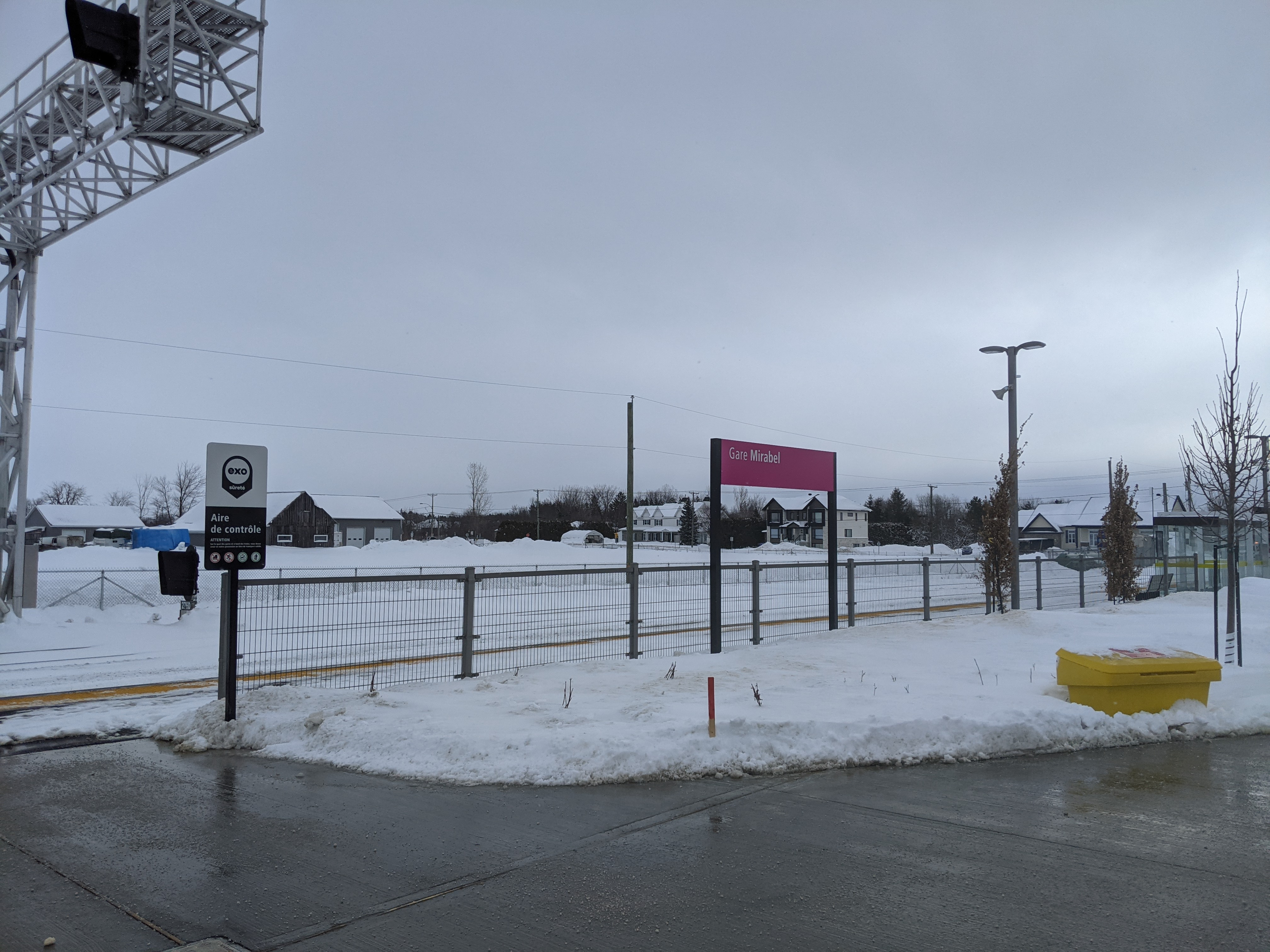
- Mirabel station platform

General information
- Location: 18341 Victor Street; Mirabel, Quebec J7J 0C5
- Coordinates: 45.7123°N 73.9190°W (approx)
- Operator: Exo
- Platforms: 1 side platform
- Tracks: 2

Construction
- Parking: 333 spaces

Other information
- Fare zone: ARTM: C

History
- Opening: January 4, 2021

Services
Preceding station	Exo	Following station
Saint-Jérôme Terminus	Line 12 – Saint-Jérôme	Blainville toward Lucien-L'Allier
Track layout
Location

Mirabel station is a commuter rail station in Mirabel, Quebec, Canada, which is served by Exo's Saint-Jérôme line. However, it is skipped by most Montréal-bound trains in the evening peak, which instead use the passing siding. Despite a preliminary study for the station's construction, a platform was not built on the existing passing siding. The station opened on January 4, 2021.

The station is located in Saint-Janvier, on the city's east side. The City of Mirabel, Exo and Union des producteurs agricoles went on a lengthy negotiation to purchase land for the station.

In December 2017, the project was given the go-ahead for preliminary plans, with a construction start due in early 2019. The station was expected to open by the end of 2020 but was postponed, as the construction site was closed for COVID-19. The station features a 300 m platform, 333 parking spaces, a kiss-and-ride passenger drop-off facility, and a bus loop with three bus platforms.
