= Grand-Moulin station =

REM station in Deux-Montagnes, Quebec, Canada

Grand-Moulin
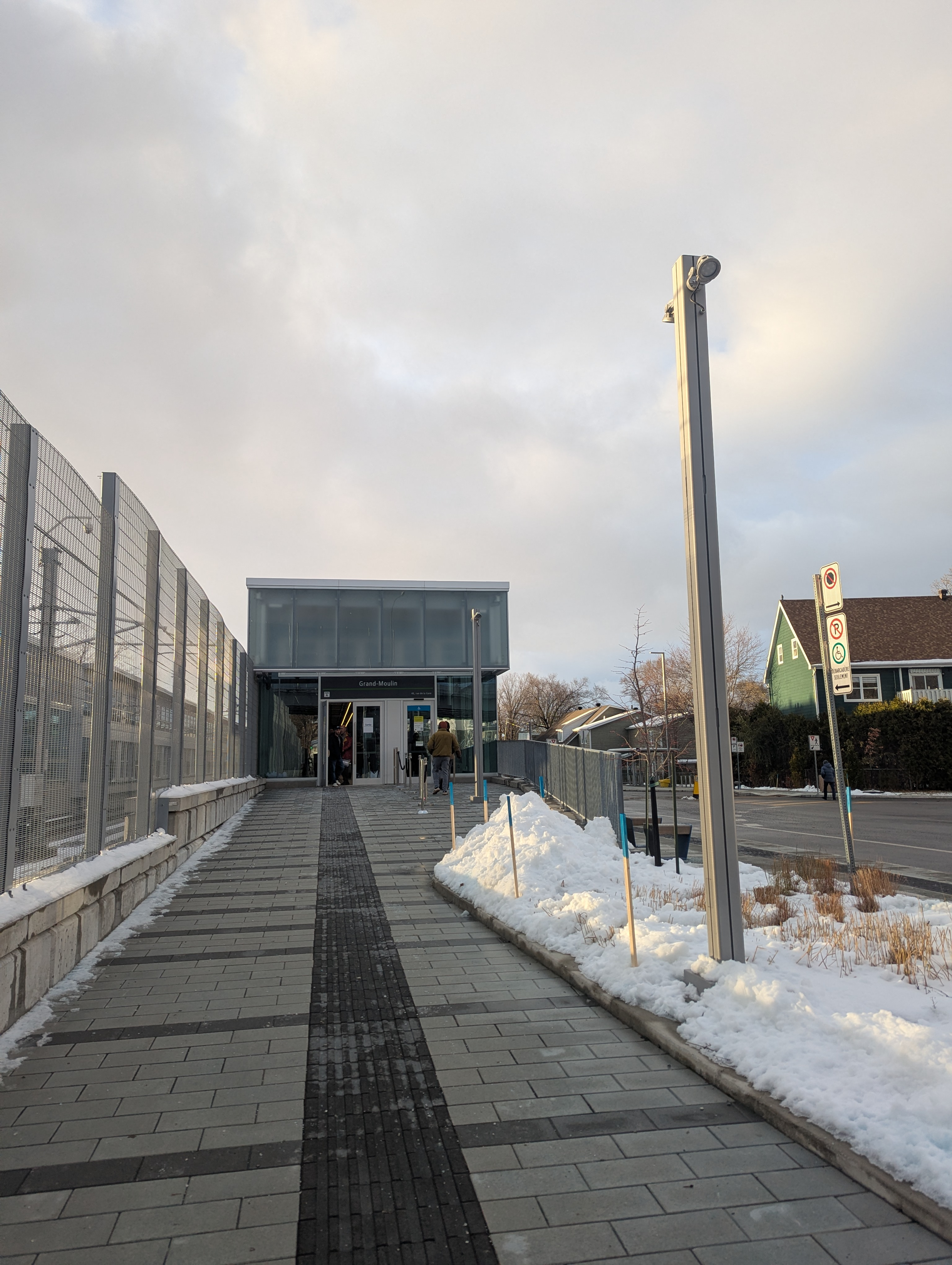
- Entrance of the station from the bus loop

General information
- Location: 46 Station Street, Deux-Montagnes, Quebec
- Coordinates: 45°32′14″N 73°53′16″W
- Operator: Pulsar (AtkinsRéalis and Alstom)
- Platforms: 2 side platforms
- Tracks: 2
- Connections: Société de transport de Laval; Exo bus services

Construction
- Structure type: At-grade
- Parking: 236 spaces
- Cycle facilities: 44 spaces
- Accessible: Yes

Other information
- Station code: GRM
- Fare zone: ARTM: C
- Website: rem.info/en/travelling/stations/grand-moulin

History
- Opened: 1925 (modernized 1995)
- Closed: December 31, 2020
- Rebuilt: November 17, 2025
- Former names: Deux-Montagnes; St. Eustache-sur-le-Lac

Passengers
- 2019: 403,400 (Exo)

Services
Preceding station	REM	Following station
Deux-Montagnes Terminus	Réseau express métropolitain	Sainte-Dorothée toward Brossard
Former services
Preceding station	Exo	Following station
Deux-Montagnes Terminus	Deux-Montagnes	Sainte-Dorothée toward Montreal
Preceding station	Canadian National Railway	Following station
Services in 1943
Fresnière toward Lac Remi	Montreal – Lac Remi	Sainte-Dorothée toward Montreal
Fresnière Limited service toward Hawkesbury	St. Eustache-sur-le-Lac services	Sainte-Dorothée toward Montreal
Terminus	St. Eustache-sur-le-Lac services	Sainte-Dorothée toward Montreal
Location

Grand-Moulin (pronounced [ɡʁɑ̃mulɛ̃]) is a Réseau express métropolitain (REM) station that opened on 17 November 2025. It is located in Deux-Montagnes, Quebec, Canada.

The station replaced a commuter rail station by the same name, operated by Exo on the Deux-Montagnes line. The commuter train station was closed to make way for REM construction in May 2020.

== History ==
The station opened in 1925 as Saint-Eustache-sur-le-Lac, and was renamed Deux-Montagnes in 1962. In 1995, the Deux-Montagnes line was extended by one station; the new terminus, located on Boulevard Deux-Montagnes, took over the name Deux-Montagnes station, and the previous Deux-Montagnes station was renamed for nearby Chemin du Grand-Moulin.

The name derives from the presence of a grain mill, built in 1862, which was known as the grand moulin in contrast to the existing petit moulin in Saint-Eustache, which was part of the same seigneury. The mill also gave its name to the nearby Rapides du Grand-Moulin on the Rivière des Mille-Îles.

== Connecting bus routes ==
Société de transport de Laval
No.	Route	Connects to	Service times / notes
716	REM Deux-Montagnes / Grand-Moulin / Sainte-Dorothée	Deux-Montagnes; Sainte-Dorothée	Used in case of a service disruption on the REM
TA ♿︎	STL Transport adapté		
Exo Laurentides sector
No.	Route	Connects to	Service times / notes
222	Deux-Montagnes - Sainte-Marthe-sur-le-Lac	Deux-Montagnes	Daily
225	Deux-Montagnes - Saint-Eustache (A-Sauvé)	Deux-Montagnes	Daily
226	Deux-Montagnes - Saint-Eustache (A-Sauvé)	Deux-Montagnes	Daily
Exo Transport adapté
No.	Route	Connects to	Service times / notes
TA ♿︎	Exo Transport adapté		
