= Sainte-Dorothée station =

REM station in Laval, Quebec, Canada

Sainte-Dorothée
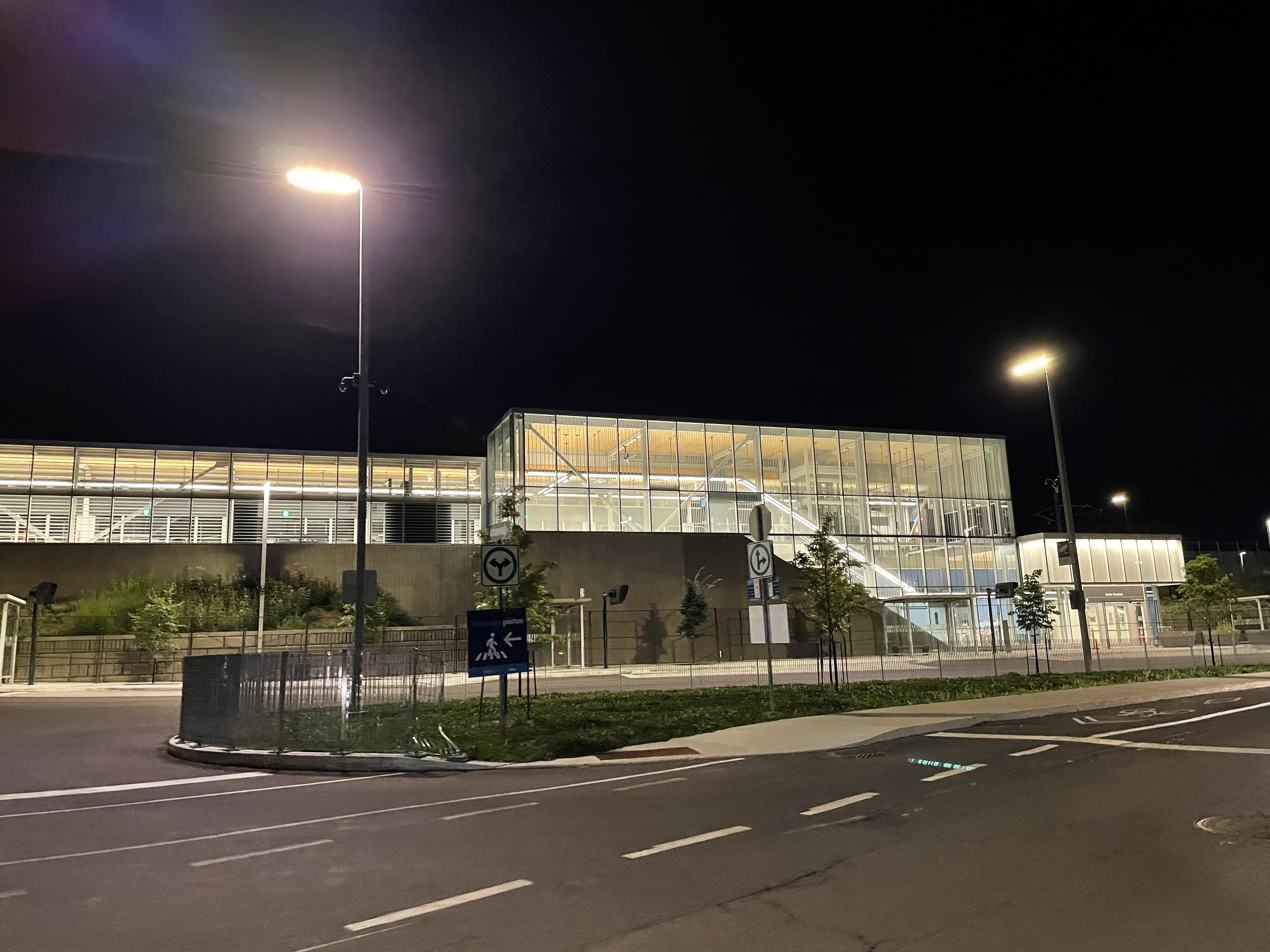
- Sainte-Dorothée REM station at night

General information
- Location: 1411 Waterside Road; Laval, Quebec
- Coordinates: 45°31′24″N 73°51′40″W
- Operator: Pulsar (AtkinsRéalis and Alstom)
- Platforms: 2 side platforms
- Tracks: 2
- Connections: Société de transport de Laval

Construction
- Structure type: Embankment
- Parking: 848 spaces
- Cycle facilities: 20 spaces
- Accessible: Yes

Other information
- Station code: SDR
- Fare zone: ARTM: B
- Website: rem.info/en/travelling/stations/sainte-dorothee

History
- Opened: 1995
- Closed: December 31, 2020
- Rebuilt: November 17, 2025
- Electrified: 1,500 V DC catenary

Passengers
- 2019: 795,200 (Exo)

Services
Preceding station	REM	Following station
Grand-Moulin toward Deux-Montagnes	Réseau express métropolitain	Île-Bigras toward Brossard
Former services
Preceding station	Exo	Following station
Grand-Moulin toward Deux-Montagnes	Deux-Montagnes	Île-Bigras toward Montreal
Services at Laval-sur-le-Lac, Laval-Links, and Sainte-Dorothée stations
Preceding station	Canadian National Railway	Following station
Services in 1943
St. Eustache-sur-le-Lac toward Lac Remi	Montreal – Lac Remi	Ste. Genevieve toward Montreal
St. Eustache-sur-le-Lac toward St. Eustache-sur-le-Lac or Hawkesbury	St. Eustache-sur-le-Lac services	Ste. Genevieve toward Montreal
Location

Sainte-Dorothée (pronounced [sɛ̃tdɔʁɔte]) is a Réseau express métropolitain (REM) station in Laval, Quebec, Canada that opened on 17 November 2025.

The station opened in 1995, following the modernization of the Deux-Montagnes commuter rail line, part of the Exo network. It closed in May 2020, as part of the conversion of the line to become part of the REM.

== Origin of name ==
Sainte-Dorothée takes its name from the Sainte-Dorothée district of Laval, Quebec.

Between 1993 and 1995, prior to the modernization of the Deux-Montagnes Line, there were three stations served now by Sainte-Dorothée, from north to south: Laval-sur-le-Lac, Laval-Links, and Sainte-Dorothée. There were also plans to amalgamate Île-Bigras into this station as well, but plans were shelved after an outcry from residents of Île-Bigras.

== Location ==
The station is located at 1411 chemin du Bord-de-l'Eau at rue Gobeil, in Laval. It is easily accessible from Autoroute 440 which, west of Autoroute 13, becomes Avenue des Bois.

== Connecting bus routes ==
Société de transport de Laval
No.	Route	Connects to	Services times / notes
26	Métro Montmorency - Station Sainte-Dorothée	Montmorency	Daily
76	Métro Montmorency - Station Sainte-Dorothée	Montmorency	Daily
203	Fabreville - Sainte-Dorothée		Daily
713	Métro Côte-Vertu - Sainte-Dorothée	Côte-Vertu; Bois-Franc; Île-Bigras	Weekdays only (scheduled service) Used in case of a service disruption on the REM (weekends)
716	REM Deux-Montagnes / Grand-Moulin / Sainte-Dorothée	Deux-Montagnes; Grand-Moulin	Used in case of a service disruption on the REM
903	Métro Montmorency - Station Sainte-Dorothée	Montmorency; Terminus Le Carrefour	Daily
TA ♿︎	STL Transport adapté		
Exo Transport adapté
No.	Route	Connects to	Service times / notes
TA ♿︎	Exo Transport adapté		
