= Deux-Montagnes station =

REM station in Deux-Montagnes, Quebec, Canada

Deux-Montagnes
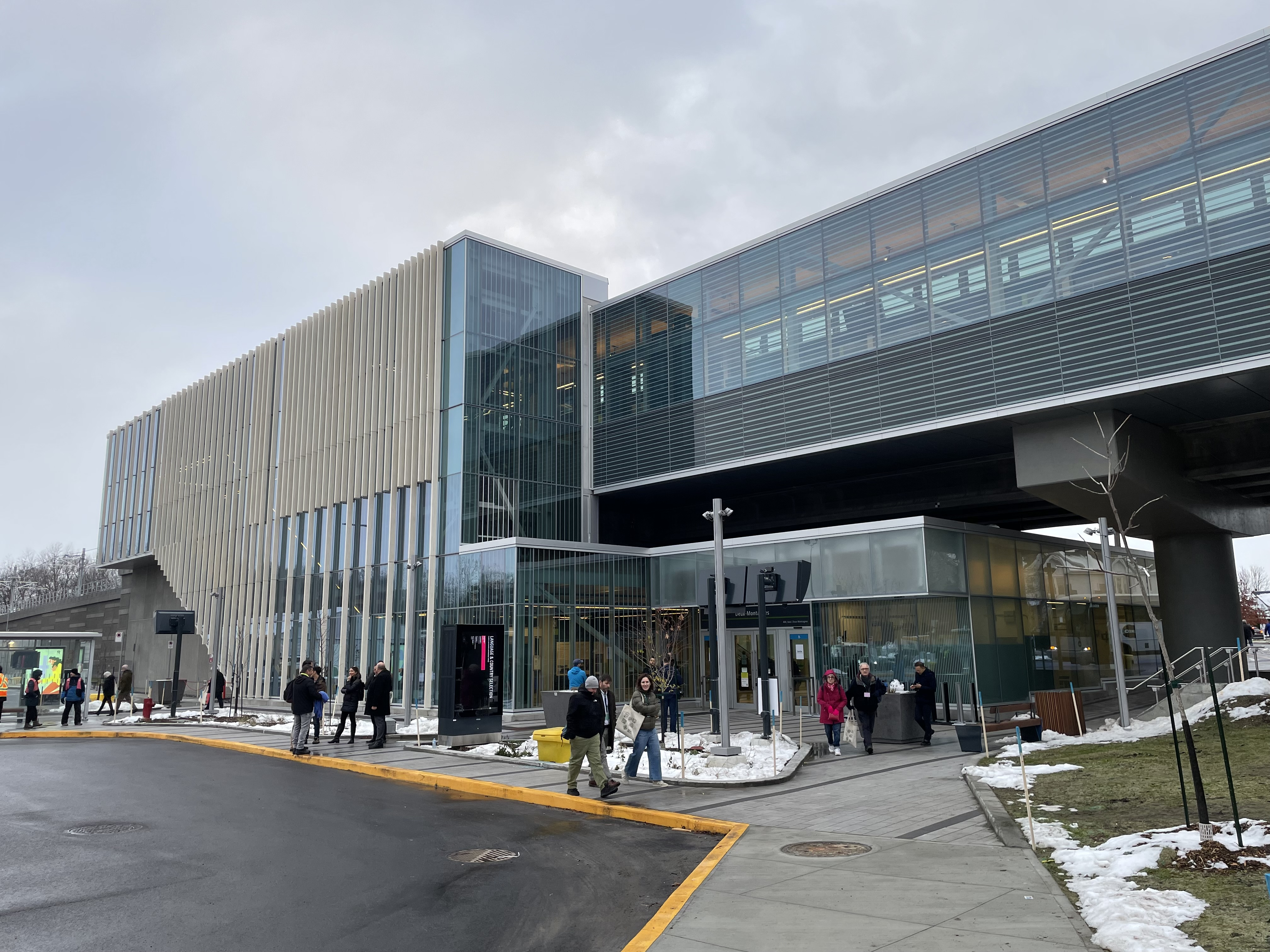
- Deux-Montagnes station as seen from bus loop

General information
- Location: 400 Deux-Montagnes Boulevard; Deux-Montagnes, Quebec; Canada
- Coordinates: 45°32′44″N 73°54′44″W
- Operator: Pulsar (AtkinsRéalis and Alstom)
- Platforms: 2 side platforms
- Tracks: 2
- Bus stands: 5
- Connections: Société de transport de Laval; Exo bus services

Construction
- Structure type: Elevated
- Parking: 739 spaces
- Cycle facilities: 248 rack spaces
- Accessible: Yes

Other information
- Station code: DEM
- Fare zone: ARTM: C
- Website: rem.info/en/stations/deux-montagnes

History
- Opened: 1995
- Closed: 31 December 2020
- Rebuilt: 17 November 2025

Passengers
- 2019: 1,311,800 (Exo)

Services
Preceding station	REM	Following station
Terminus	Réseau express métropolitain	Grand-Moulin toward Brossard
Former services
Preceding station	Exo	Following station
Terminus	Deux-Montagnes	Grand-Moulin toward Montreal
Track layout
Location

Deux-Montagnes (pronounced [dømɔ̃taɲ]) is the terminus station of the Réseau express métropolitain (REM) in Deux-Montagnes, Quebec, Canada. REM service at the station began on 17 November 2025. The station serves as the terminus of the Deux-Montagnes branch of the REM.

The REM station replaced a commuter train station by the same name, which opened in 1995 as the northern terminus of the Deux-Montagnes commuter rail line, part of the Exo network. On 31 December 2020, the station closed as part of the conversion of the line to become part of the REM.

== History ==
Deux-Montagnes takes its name from Deux-Montagnes, the municipality where it is located. Before 1995, the name designated what is now Grand-Moulin station; with the extension of the Deux-Montagnes line, the name was transferred to the new terminus.

Before the construction of the REM station, the train station building hosted municipal offices as well as a passenger waiting area. The lawn in front of the station building hosted CN 6710, a GE boxcab electric-powered locomotive that brought trains through the Mount Royal Tunnel until 1995. As construction began, CDPQ Infra paid to have the locomotive relocated to a new site on Chemin d'Oka, at the eastern border of Deux-Montagnes, near the Deux-Montagnes public library.

== Location ==
The station is located at 400, boul. Deux-Montagnes, near Autoroute 640 (exit 8). The station is also served by pedestrian walkways and bicycle routes in Deux-Montagnes.

Beyond the station, there is a light maintenance and storage depot for REM trains, located to the west of the station on the other side of Autoroute 640 where the EXO yard had been.

== Connecting bus routes ==
Société de transport de Laval
No.	Route	Connects to	Service times / notes
714	REM Deux-Montagnes / Côte-Vertu	Côte-Vertu	Used in case of a service disruption on the REM
715	REM Deux-Montagnes / Bois-Franc	Bois-Franc	Used in case of a service disruption on the REM
716	REM Deux-Montagnes / Grand-Moulin / Sainte-Dorothée	Grand-Moulin; Sainte-Dorothée	Used in case of a service disruption on the REM
TA ♿︎	STL Transport adapté		
Exo Laurentides sector
No.	Route	Connects to	Service times / notes
220	Deux-Montagnes - Pointe-Calumet (59e Avenue)		Daily
221	Deux-Montagnes - Pointe-Calumet (Avenue Joseph)		Daily
222	Deux-Montagnes - Sainte-Marthe-sur-le-Lac	Grand-Moulin	Daily
225	Deux-Montagnes - Saint-Eustache (A-Sauvé)	Grand-Moulin	Daily
226	Deux-Montagnes - Saint-Eustache (A-Sauvé)	Grand-Moulin	Daily
227	Deux-Montagnes - Saint-Eustache (Centre)		Daily
228	Deux-Montagnes - Saint-Eustache (Centre)		Daily
405	Deux-Montagnes / Sainte-Thérèse Express	Sainte-Thérèse	Weekdays, peak only
600	Deux-Montagnes - Saint-Eustache (South) - Sainte-Thérèse	Sainte-Thérèse	Daily
604	Saint-Placide - Oka - Deux-Montagnes		Weekdays only
605	Deux-Montagnes - Saint-Eustache (North) - Sainte-Thérèse	Sainte-Thérèse	Weekdays, peak only
708	Saint-Eustache - Laval (Métro Montmorency)	Montmorency; Terminus Le Carrefour (partial service)	Daily
Exo Transport adapté
No.	Route	Connects to	Service times / notes
TA ♿︎	Exo Transport adapté		
