= Exo Laurentides sector =

Bus service in Quebec, Canada

- Parent: Exo
- Founded: July 1st, 2017
- Service area: Blainville, Bois-des-Filion, Boisbriand, Deux-Montagnes, Lorraine, Mirabel, Pointe-Calumet, Rosemère, Sainte-Anne-des-Plaines, Saint-Eustache, Sainte-Marthe-sur-le-Lac, Sainte-Thérèse, Saint-Jérôme, Saint-Joseph-du-Lac
- Service type: Bus service, paratransit
- Routes: 47
- Hubs: Gare Saint-Jérôme, Gare Sainte-Thérèse, Terminus Saint-Eustache
- Annual ridership: 4,984,103 (2024)
- Website: https://exo.quebec/fr/planifier-trajet/autobus/CITLA

The Exo Laurentides sector is the division of Exo that delivers bus service for the southern portion of the Laurentides region of Quebec, Canada, mainly the suburban area on the northwest side of Montreal.

The Laurentides sector provides bus, taxibus and parataxis to the municipalities of Blainville, Bois-des-Filion, Boisbriand, Deux-Montagnes, Lorraine, Mirabel, Oka, Pointe-Calumet, Rosemère, Sainte-Anne-des-Plaines, Saint-Eustache, Sainte-Marthe-sur-le-Lac, Sainte-Thérèse, Saint-Jérôme and Saint-Joseph-du-Lac.

== History ==
The former services of CIT des Basses Laurentides, CIT de Deux-Montagnes, OMIT de St-Eustache and OMIT de St-Jérôme were amalgamated in 2004 to form the new Conseil Intermunicipal de Transport Laurentides with expanded service to some areas.

On June 1, 2017, a new law reorganizing public transit agencies in Greater Montreal abolished the CITs and established a new Réseau de transport métropolitain (RTM, later branded Exo), that, among other things, assumed the CITL's responsibilities, assets and employees.

On June 23, 2025, a first phase of a redesigned network was deployed for the northern part of the sector. The second phase of the redesigned network was deployed for the rest of the sector on November 10, 2025, to coincide with the opening of the Réseau express métropolitain.

== Services ==
=== Local bus routes ===
Local routes
| No. | Route | Connects to | Service times / notes |
|---|---|---|---|
| 220 | Deux-Montagnes - Pointe-Calumet (59e Avenue) | Deux-Montagnes | Daily |
| 221 | Deux-Montagnes - Pointe-Calumet (Avenue Joseph) | Deux-Montagnes | Daily |
| 222 | Deux-Montagnes - Sainte-Marthe-sur-le-Lac | Grand-Moulin; Deux-Montagnes | Daily |
| 225 | Deux-Montagnes - Saint-Eustache (A-Sauvé) | Grand-Moulin; Deux-Montagnes | Daily |
| 226 | Deux-Montagnes - Saint-Eustache (A-Sauvé) | Grand-Moulin; Deux-Montagnes | Daily |
| 227 | Deux-Montagnes - Saint-Eustache (Centre) | Deux-Montagnes | Daily |
| 228 | Deux-Montagnes - Saint-Eustache (Centre) | Deux-Montagnes | Daily |
| 230 | Saint-Jérôme (Downtown) | | Daily |
| 231 | Saint-Jérôme (Centre) | Saint-Jérôme | Daily |
| 232 | Saint-Jérôme (Centre) | Saint-Jérôme | Daily |
| 233 | Saint-Jérôme (Bellefeuille) | Saint-Jérôme | Daily |
| 234 | Saint-Jérôme (Bellefeuille) | Saint-Jérôme | Daily |
| 235 | Saint-Jérôme (Lafontaine) | Saint-Jérôme | Daily |
| 236 | Saint-Jérôme (Saint-Antoine) | Saint-Jérôme | Daily |
| 237 | Saint-Jérôme (Saint-Antoine) | Saint-Jérôme | Daily |
| 238 | Saint-Jérôme - Mirabel (Saint-Canut) | Saint-Jérôme | Daily |
| 239 | Saint-Jérôme - Mirabel (Mirabel-en-Haut) | Saint-Jérôme | Daily |
| 240 | Boisbriand North towards Boisbriand South | Sainte-Thérèse | Weekdays only |
| 241 | Boisbriand South towards Boisbriand North | Sainte-Thérèse | Weekdays only |
| 242 | Sainte-Thérèse - Rosemere - Laval (Sainte-Rose) | Sainte-Thérèse | Daily |
| 243 | Saint-Augustin - Sainte-Thérèse | Sainte-Thérèse | Weekdays only |
| 246 | Saint-Thérèse - Blainville (Renaissance) | Sainte-Thérèse | Weekdays only |
| 247 | Saint-Thérèse - Blainville | Sainte-Thérèse | Daily |
| 248 | Rosemère - Gare Rosemère | Rosemère | Weekdays only |
| 249 | Sainte-Thérèse - Lorraine - Terrebonne | Sainte-Thérèse | Daily |
| 250 | Sainte-Anne-des-Plaines - Sainte-Thérèse | Sainte-Thérèse | Daily |
| 251 | Sainte-Thérèse - Polyvalente Sainte-Thérèse | Sainte-Thérèse | Daily |
| 252 | Sainte-Thérèse (des Milles-Îles) | Sainte-Thérèse | Weekdays only |
| 253 | Terrebonne - Lorraine - Gare Rosemère | Rosemère | Weekdays only |
| 254 | Gare Blainville - Blainville (East) | Blainville | Weekdays only |
| 255 | Gare Blainville - Blainville (West) | Blainville | Weekdays only |
| 256 | Archambault Institution | | Daily, only two departures per direction |

=== Express / regional bus routes ===
Express / regional routes
| No. | Route | Connects to | Service times / notes |
|---|---|---|---|
| 405 | Deux-Montagnes / Sainte-Thérèse Express | Deux-Montagnes; Sainte-Thérèse | Weekdays, peak only |
| 509 | Saint-Jérôme - Laval (Express) | Montmorency; Saint-Jérôme | Weekdays, peak only |
| 514 | Sainte-Anne-des-Plaines - Laval | Cartier | Weekdays, peak only |
| 600 | Deux-Montagnes - Saint-Eustache (South) - Sainte-Thérèse | Deux-Montagnes; Sainte-Thérèse | Daily |
| 604 | Saint-Placide - Oka - Deux-Montagnes | Deux-Montagnes | Weekdays only |
| 605 | Deux-Montagnes - Saint-Eustache (North) - Sainte-Thérèse | Deux-Montagnes; Sainte-Thérèse | Weekdays, peak only |
| 610 | Sainte-Thérèse - Terrebonne | Rosemère; Sainte-Thérèse; Terminus Terrebonne | Daily |
| 707 | Boisbriand - Laval (métro Montmorency) | Montmorency | Weekdays, peak only |
| 708 | Saint-Eustache - Laval (Métro Montmorency) | Montmorency; Deux-Montagnes; Terminus Le Carrefour | Daily |
| 709 | Saint-Jérôme - Laval | Montmorency; Saint-Jérôme; Sainte-Thérèse | Daily |
| YMX | YMX Express | Montmorency | Weekdays only, AM towards YMX and PM towards Montmorency |

== See also ==
- Exo bus services
