= Saint-Jérôme station =

Railway station in Quebec, Canada

Saint-Jérôme
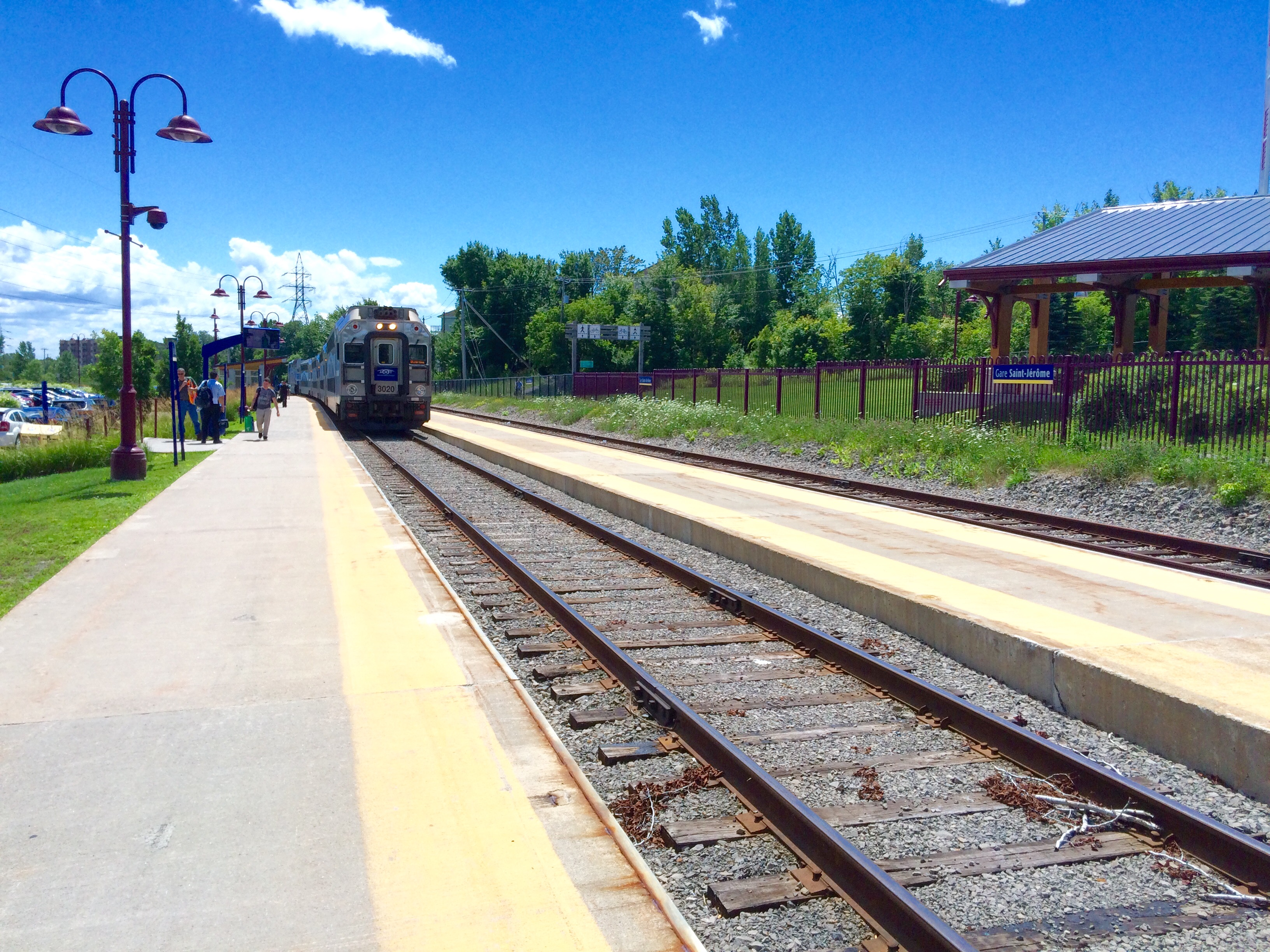

General information
- Location: 280 Latour Street; Saint-Jérôme, Quebec, J7Z 2G7
- Coordinates: 45°46′24″N 73°59′59″W
- Operator: Exo
- Platforms: 1 side platform, 1 island platform (island platform not normally used)
- Tracks: 2
- Connections: Exo bus services; Transport MRC de Joliette; Intercity buses

Construction
- Parking: 775 spaces
- Cycle facilities: 30 spaces

Other information
- Fare zone: ARTM: C
- Website: Saint-Jérôme station (RTM)

History
- Opened: January 8, 2007

Passengers
- 2019: 523,500 (Exo)

Services
| Preceding station | Exo | Following station |
|---|---|---|
| Terminus | Line 12 – Saint-Jérôme | Mirabel toward Lucien-L'Allier |
Former services
| Preceding station | Canadian Pacific Railway | Following station |
|---|---|---|
| Lesage toward Mont-Laurier | Montreal – Mont-Laurier | Saint-Janvier toward Montreal Place Viger |
Track layout
Location

Saint-Jérôme station (French pronunciation: [sɛ̃ ʒeʁom]) is an intermodal transit station in Saint-Jérôme, Quebec, Canada. It serves Exo and intercity buses as well as Exo commuter rail trains on the Saint-Jérôme line.

== Description ==
It serves bus routes operated by Exo bus services, a suburban transit agency, and by two intercity bus companies. In addition to loading areas for buses, it includes train platforms which are used by the Saint-Jérôme line as a terminus. The line is operated by Exo, the public transport system in the Greater Montreal area. Commuter trains towards Montreal began serving the station on Monday, January 8, 2007, with four (of 10) trains on weekdays. The ride from Saint-Jérôme to Lucien-L'Allier station takes 85 minutes. Saint-Jérôme is in ARTM fare zone C, and the station currently has parking for 775 cars. Prior to the reform of the ARTM's fare system in July 2022, it was in zone 7.

The train station has a main track, a signalled siding, and two platforms. However, only platform 1, a side platform on the main track, is in use. Since trains are longer than the platform, selective door operation is used. Platform 2, an island platform between the tracks, is not used during normal service. Since it is even shorter than platform 1, this limits its use to situations where malfunctioning rolling stock would have to be stabled on the siding.

The station is built primarily of wood, drawing its inspiration from the former Canadian Pacific Railway station in Saint-Jérôme and from industrial architecture of the 1900s.

The former Canadian Pacific Railway station in Saint-Jérôme at 160, rue de la Gare (in the former civic numbering, 301 Sainte-Anne Street) was designated in 1994 as a heritage railway station by the Historic Sites and Monuments Board of Canada, and is now used as an exhibition space and events facility.

== Location ==
Some documents give the station's address as 455, boul. Jean-Baptiste-Rolland E. in Saint-Jérôme, but the address is more commonly shown as 280, rue Latour.

== Connecting bus routes ==
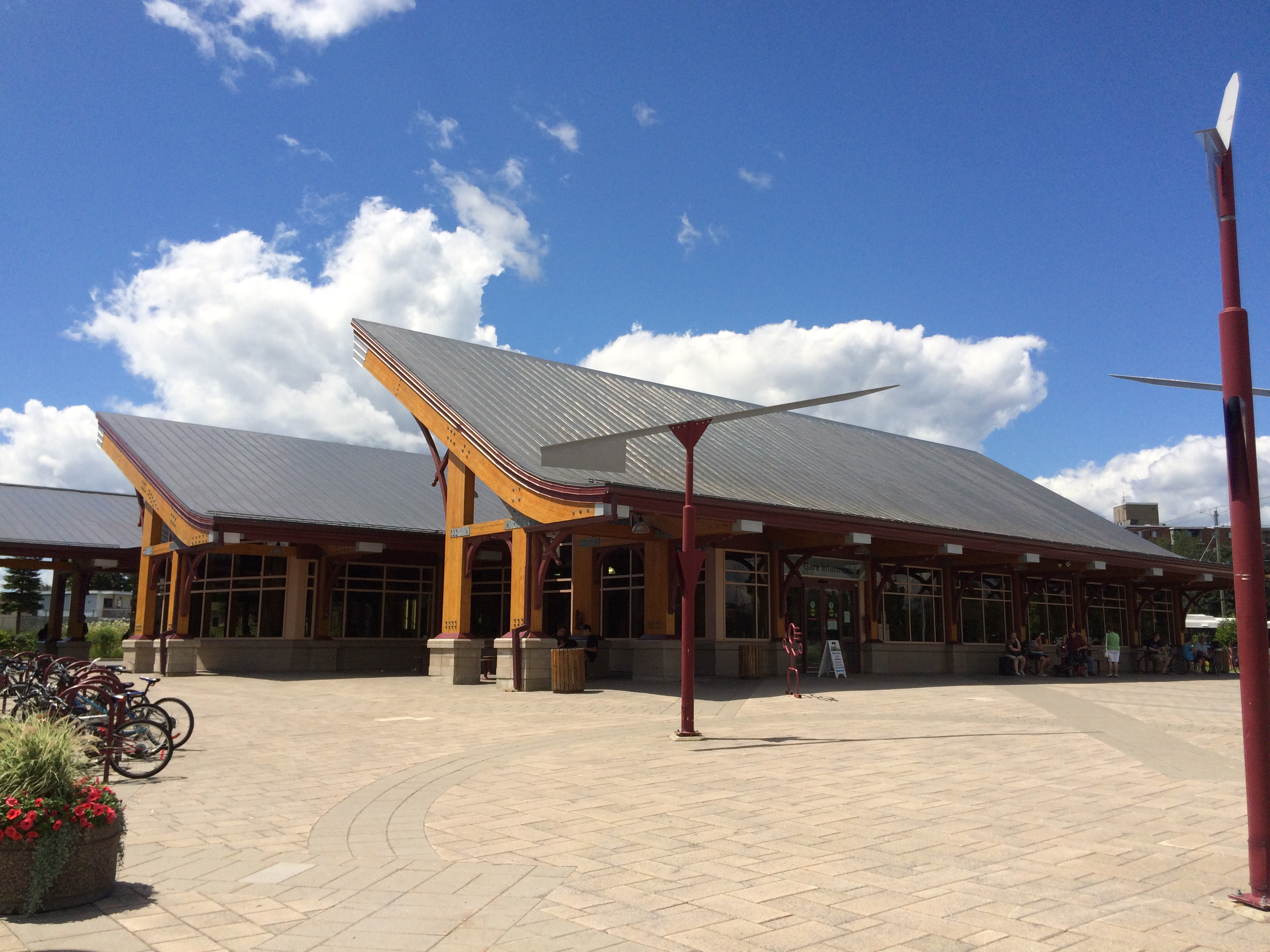
Station building and bus terminal

Exo Laurentides sector
| No. | Route | Connects to | Service times / notes |
|---|---|---|---|
| 231 | Saint-Jérôme (Centre) | | Daily |
| 232 | Saint-Jérôme (Centre) | | Daily |
| 233 | Saint-Jérôme (Bellefeuille) | | Daily |
| 234 | Saint-Jérôme (Bellefeuille) | | Daily |
| 235 | Saint-Jérôme (Lafontaine) | | Daily |
| 236 | Saint-Jérôme (Saint-Antoine) | | Daily |
| 237 | Saint-Jérôme (Saint-Antoine) | | Daily |
| 238 | Saint-Jérôme - Mirabel (Saint-Canut) | | Daily |
| 239 | Saint-Jérôme - Mirabel (Mirabel-en-Haut) | | Daily |
| 509 | Saint-Jérôme - Laval (Express) | Montmorency | Weekdays, peak only |
| 709 | Saint-Jérôme - Laval | Sainte-Thérèse; Montmorency | Daily |
Transport MRC de Joliette
| No. | Route | Connects to | Services times / notes |
| 35 | Saint-Lin-Laurentides - Sainte-Sophie - Saint-Jérôme | | |

=== Intercity buses ===
Intercity buses
| Company | Main Destinations |
|---|---|
| Groupe Galland | Intercity service from Montreal to Mont-Laurier, Quebec |
| Autobus Maheux | Intercity service from Montreal to Rouyn-Noranda |
| Transport Adapté et Collectif des Laurentides | Intercity service from Saint-Jerome to Mont-Tremblant |
