= Laval-Links station =

Quebec commuter rail station

Laval-Links

General information
- Location: Laval, Quebec

History
- Opened: 1918 CNoR; 1923 CNR
- Closed: 1995
- Electrified: Currently 25 kV AC 60 Hz catenary 2,400 V DC until it was eliminated.

Laval-Links is a disused commuter rail station formerly operated by Canadian National Railways and the STCUM in Laval, Quebec, Canada. It was located at milepost 17 on CN's Deux-Montagnes subdivision.

It was served by the Deux-Montagnes line.

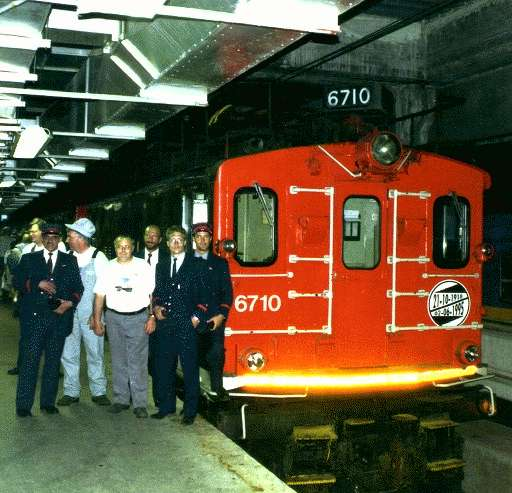
Electric Boxcab locomotive used on the Deux-Montagnes from 1918 to 1995.

== Origin of name ==
The name comes from the nearby Club Laval-sur-le-Lac golf course, a.k.a. Laval Links.

== Location ==
In the Laval-sur-le-Lac sector of Laval at the corner of rue les Cèdres, the entrance of the links, and rue les Peupliers.

== Connecting bus routes ==
Until 1995 STL route 26 on nearby rue les Érables.

== See also ==
- Laval-sur-le-Lac Golf Club
