= MR-90 =

Class of electric multiple unit

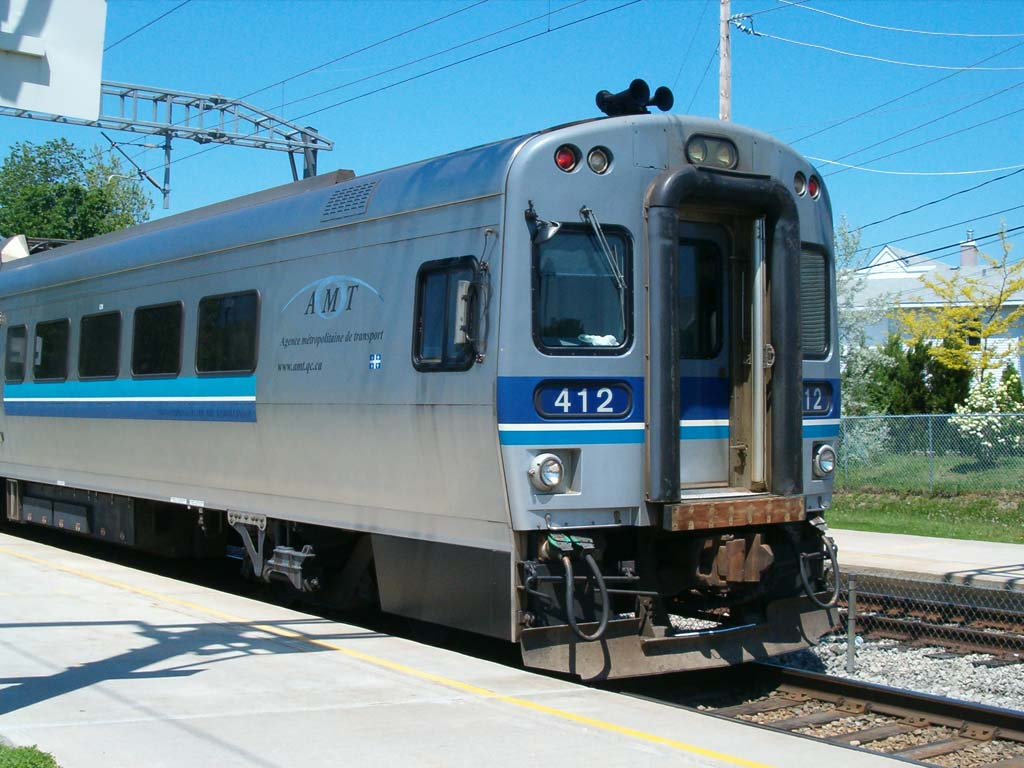
- An MR-90 at Deux-Montagnes in 2005.

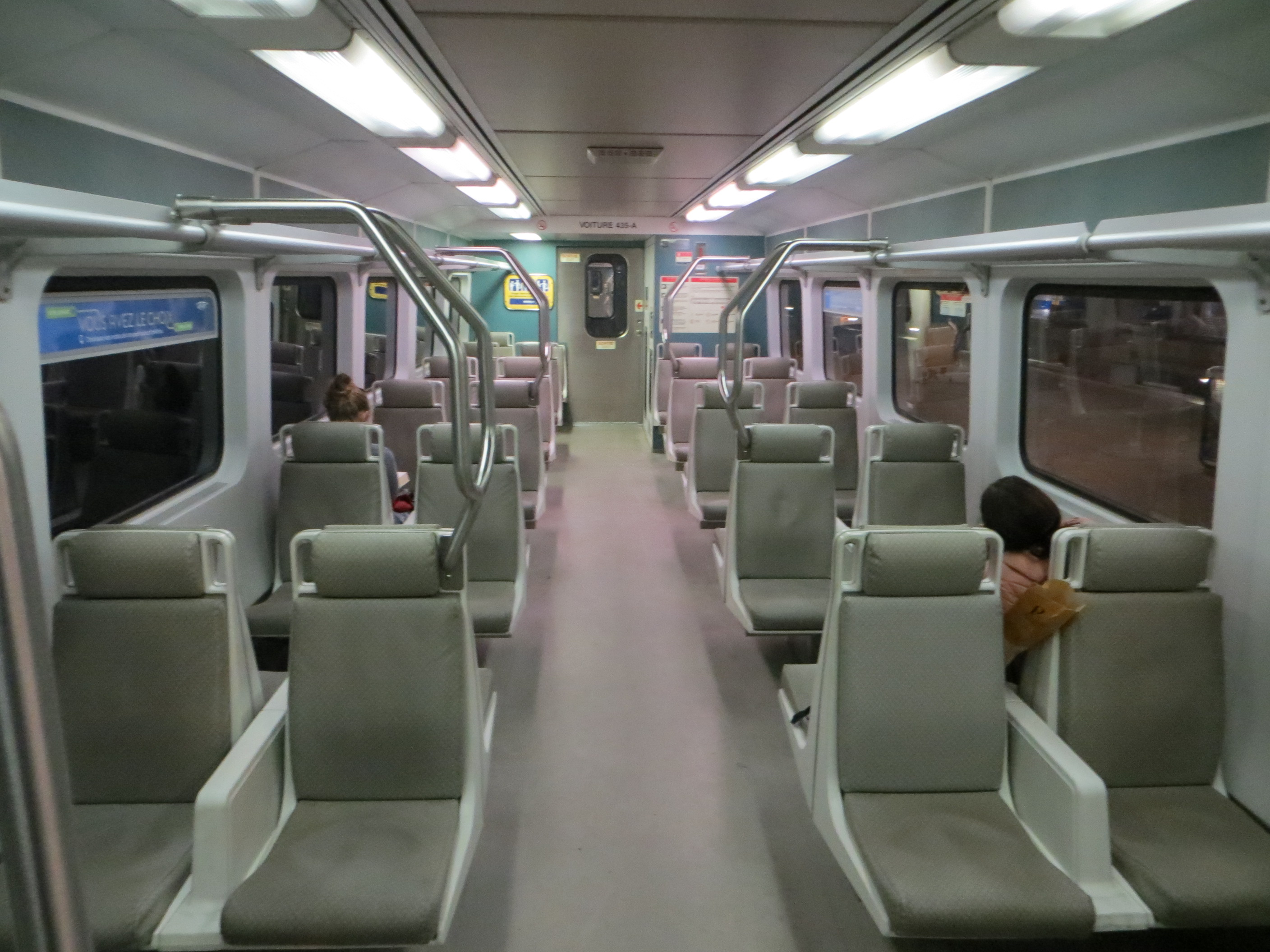
- Inside an MR-90 car
- Stock type: Electric multiple unit
- In service: 1995–2020
- Manufacturer: Bombardier Transportation
- Built at: La Pocatière
- Replaced: CN Boxcab Electric, CN electric multiple unit
- Constructed: 1994 - 1995
- Entered service: 1995
- Scrapped: 2022 - 2023
- Number built: 58
- Number preserved: 2
- Number scrapped: 56
- Fleet numbers: Motor: 400-456 (even); Trailer: 401-449 (odd); Trailer with cab: 481-487 (odd)
- Operator: Exo
- Depot: St-Eustache
- Line served: Deux-Montagnes (Exo)

Specifications
- Train length: One married pair, 52.02 m (170 ft 8 in) over couplers (length over coupler pulling faces); Maximum 5 married pairs, 260.1 m (853 ft 4 in) over couplers
- Car length: 26.01 m (85 ft 4 in) over Type H coupler and to half way of drawbar
- Wheel diameter: 864 mm (34 in)
- Wheelbase: 2,642 mm (8 ft 8 in) (truck); 18,136 mm or 59 ft 6 in truck centers
- Maximum speed: 120 km/h (75 mph) (design); 109 km/h (68 mph) (service)
- Weight: Motor: 57,169 kg (126,036 lb); Trailer: 44,465 kg (98,029 lb); Trailer with cab: 45,372 kg (100,028 lb)
- Traction motors: Siemens AC (4 × 284 kW (381 hp) / motor car)
- Power output: 1,350 kW (1,810 hp)
- Tractive effort: 100 kN (22,000 lbf) @48 km/h (30 mph)
- Acceleration: 2.4 km/(h⋅s) or 1.5 mph/s
- Deceleration: 3.2 km/(h⋅s) or 2.0 mph/s emergency: 4 km/(h⋅s) or 2.5 mph/s
- Auxiliaries: 700 V AC / one phase / 60 Hz
- Power supply: 480 V AC / three phase 60 Hz; 120 V AC / 60 Hz; 37.5 V DC Battery voltage
- Electric system: 25 kV AC 60 Hz catenary
- Current collection: Pantograph
- Bogies: 2
- Braking system: Air
- Track gauge: 1,435 mm (4 ft 8 1/2 in) standard gauge

The MR-90 was a class of single-level electric multiple unit (EMU) railcar ordered in 1992 at a price of $133,5 million by the Société de Transport de la Communauté Urbaine de Montreal (STCUM). They were built in 1994–1995 by Bombardier Transportation at its La Pocatière factory. They were delivered to the STCUM at a final cost of $119,5 million. They first operated for the STCUM starting October 26, 1995 until January 1, 1997 when operation were transferred the newly created Agence de transport métropolitaine (AMT) which had gained ownership of the rolling stock earlier on December 20, 1996. On June 1, 2017 the AMT's operations was reorganized into the Réseau de transport métropolitain (exo) which became the owner and the operator of the trains.

With the closure of the Deux-Montagnes line on December 31, 2020, in favour of the Réseau express métropolitain project, the MR-90 fleet was withdrawn from service. They were subsequently transported to Exo's Pointe-Saint-Charles maintenance center for storage. A request for information has been issued to determine the fate of the cars. In 2022, exo announced that the MR-90 coaches would be scrapped. A single married pair, composed of motor car number 400 and trailer with cab number 485, was set aside for preservation at the Canadian Railway Museum in Saint-Constant.

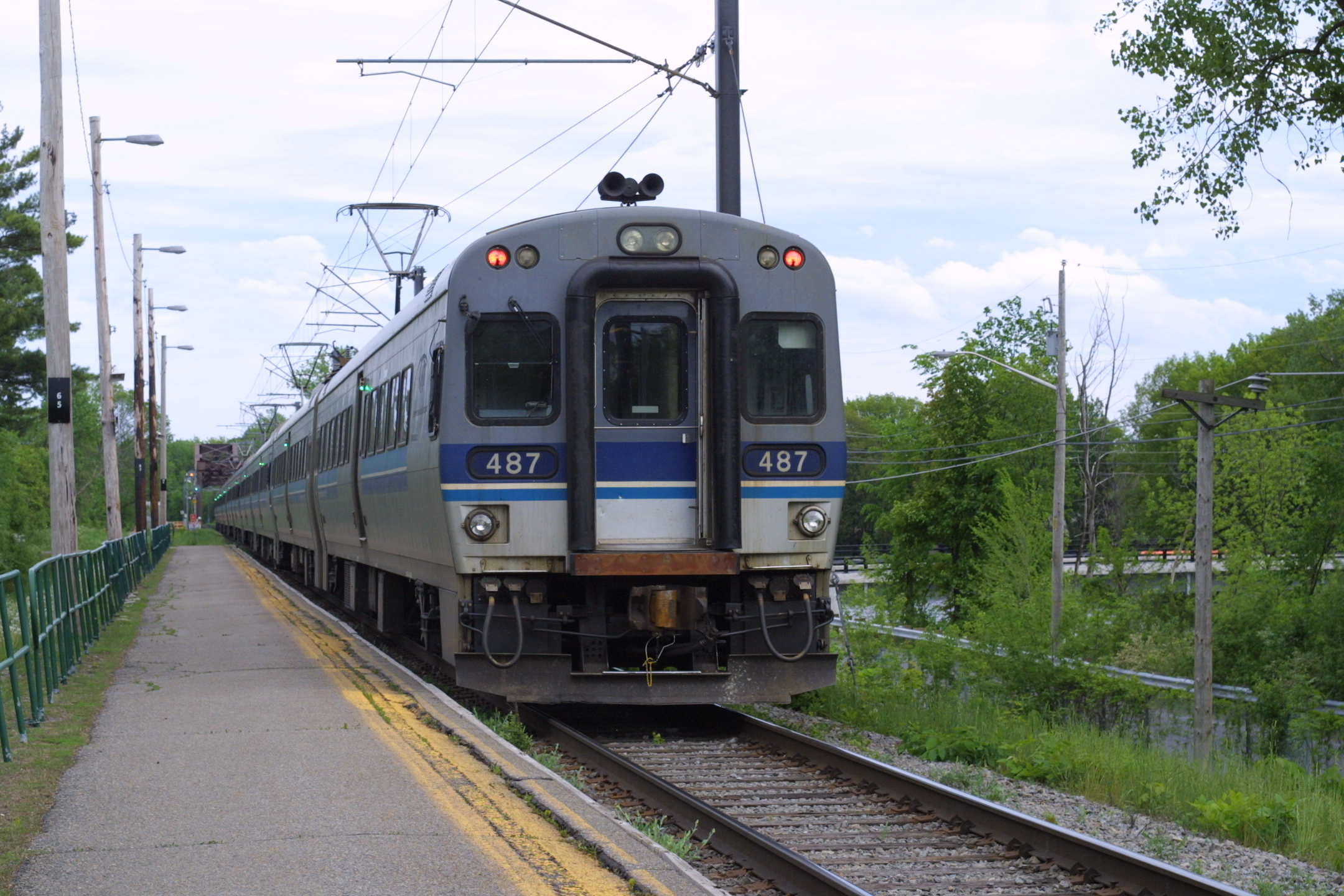
MR-90 train in summer 2020, a few months prior to the Deux-Montagnes line's closure

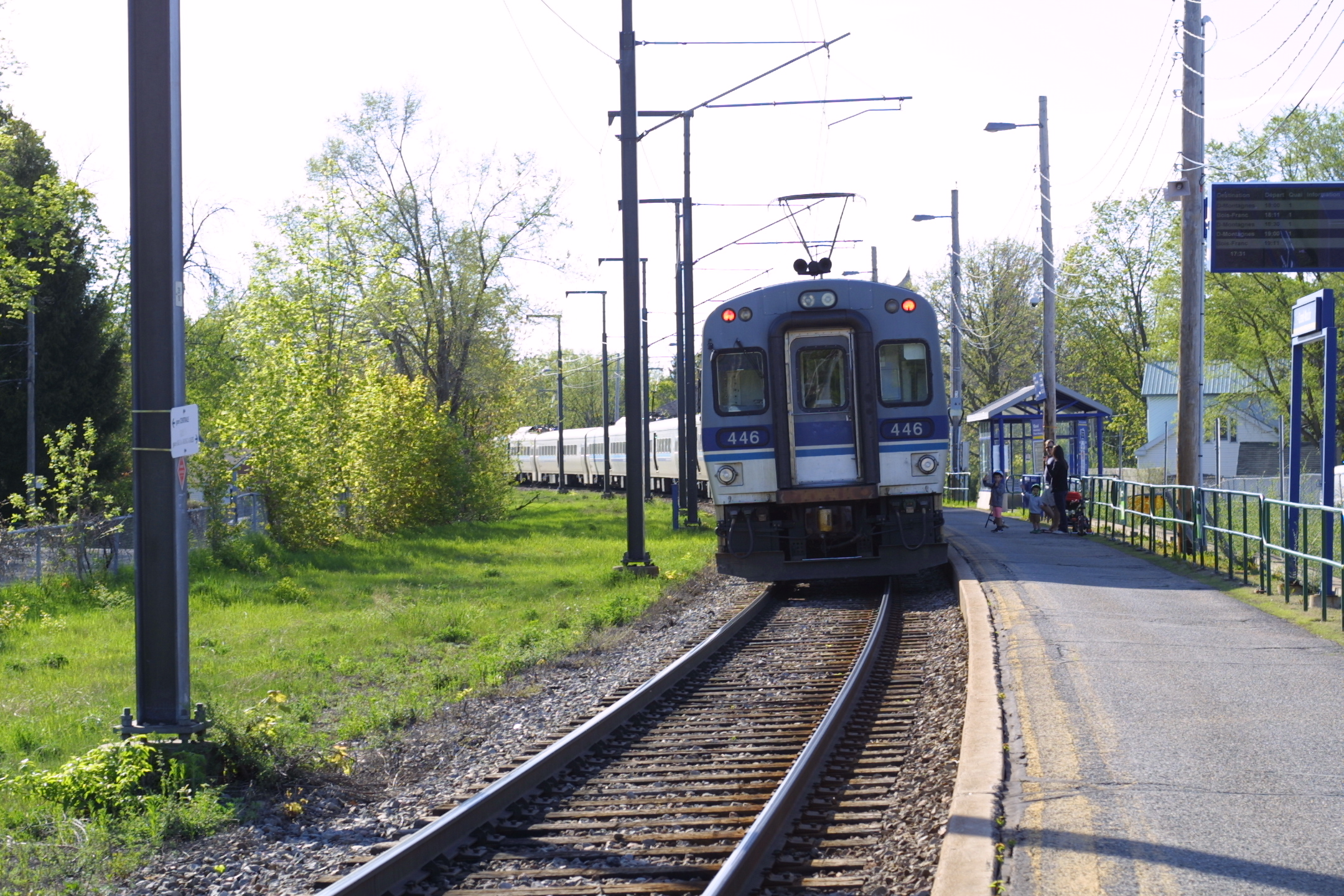
MR-90 train in summer 2020 (Grand-Moulin station)

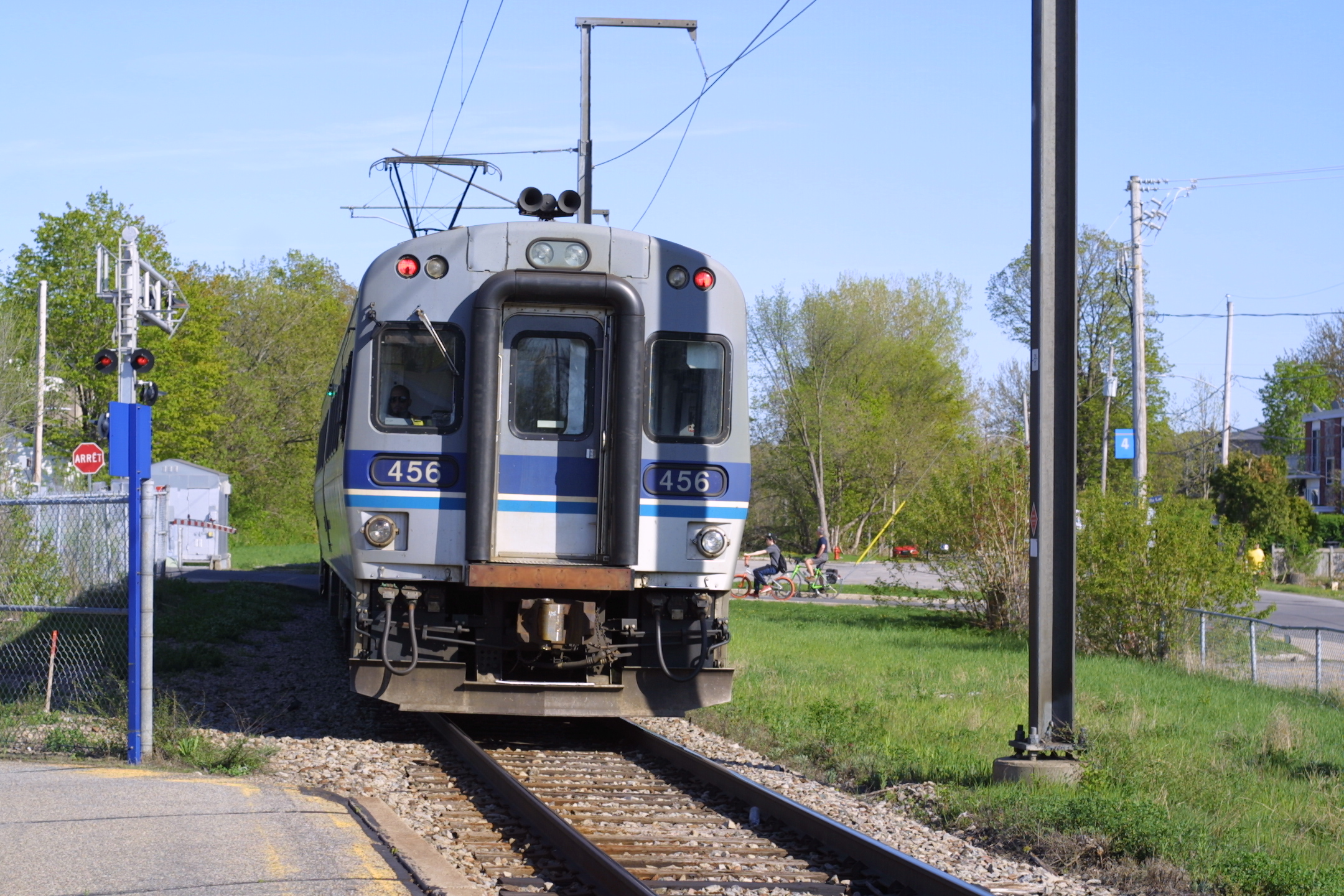
MR-90 train in summer 2020 (Grand-Moulin station)
