= Canadian National Class Z-4-a =

Class of 9 Canadian boxcab electric locomotives

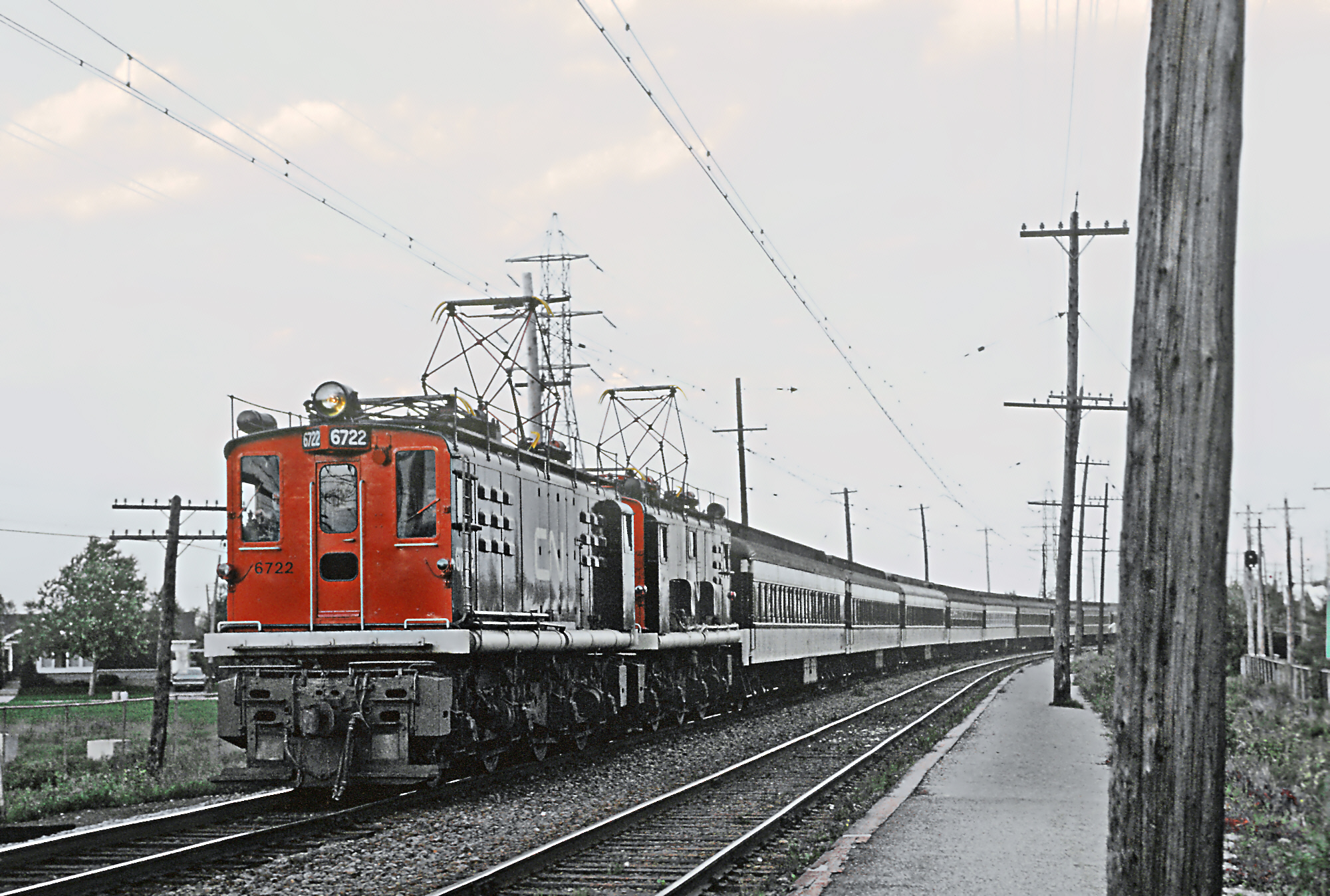
- #6722 at Monkland Station, Montreal 1971
Type and origin
- Power type: Electric
- Designer: English Electric
- Builder: English Electric
- Build date: 1924-1926
- Total produced: 9
Specifications
- Configuration
  - AAR: B+B
  - UIC: Bo+Bo
- Gauge: 4 ft 8 1/2 in (1,435 mm) standard gauge
- Minimum curve: 264 ft (80 m)
- Loco weight: 201,600 lb (91,444 kg) (78.925 t; 77.679 LT; 87.000 ST)
- Electric system/s: 2400, later 3000 V DC catenary
- Current pickup: Pantograph
Performance figures
- Maximum speed: 50 mph (80 km/h)
- Power output
  - 1 hour: 1,720 hp (1,280 kW)
- Tractive effort
  - Starting: 50,400 lbf (224 kN)
  - Continuous: 21,400 lbf (95 kN)
Career
- Operators: Montreal Harbour Commissioners; National Harbour Board; Canadian National Railway
- Class: Z-4-a
- Number in class: 9
- Numbers: 101-109 (1924 to 1941), 9180-9189 (1941 to 1949), 180-188 (1949 to 1969), 6716-6724 (1969 to withdrawal)
- Withdrawn: 1995
- Disposition: All scrapped

The Canadian National Class Z-4-a was a batch of nine electric "boxcab" type locomotives built by English Electric for the Montreal Harbour Commissioners, later the National Harbour Board of Canada from 1924 to 1926. The Port of Montreal decided to de-electrify its railway system in 1940, and so in 1941 the fleet of locomotives was traded with Canadian National Railway for seven steam switcher locomotives. They were given the classification Class Z-4-a by CN and renumbered. They would subsequently be renumbered in 1949 and finally 1969. Here they complimented the older GE built boxcabs, the class Z-1-a. Both boxcab types served the Mount Royal Tunnel route in Montreal for many years until retirement in June 1995.

== See also ==
- CN electric multiple unit Multiple unit sets used in the Mt Royal Tunnel
- Canadian National Class Z-1-a earlier Mt Royal Tunnel boxcabs built by General Electric
- NZR EO class (1923) smaller locomotives built for New Zealand in the same era
