= CN electric multiple unit =

Canadian electric railcars

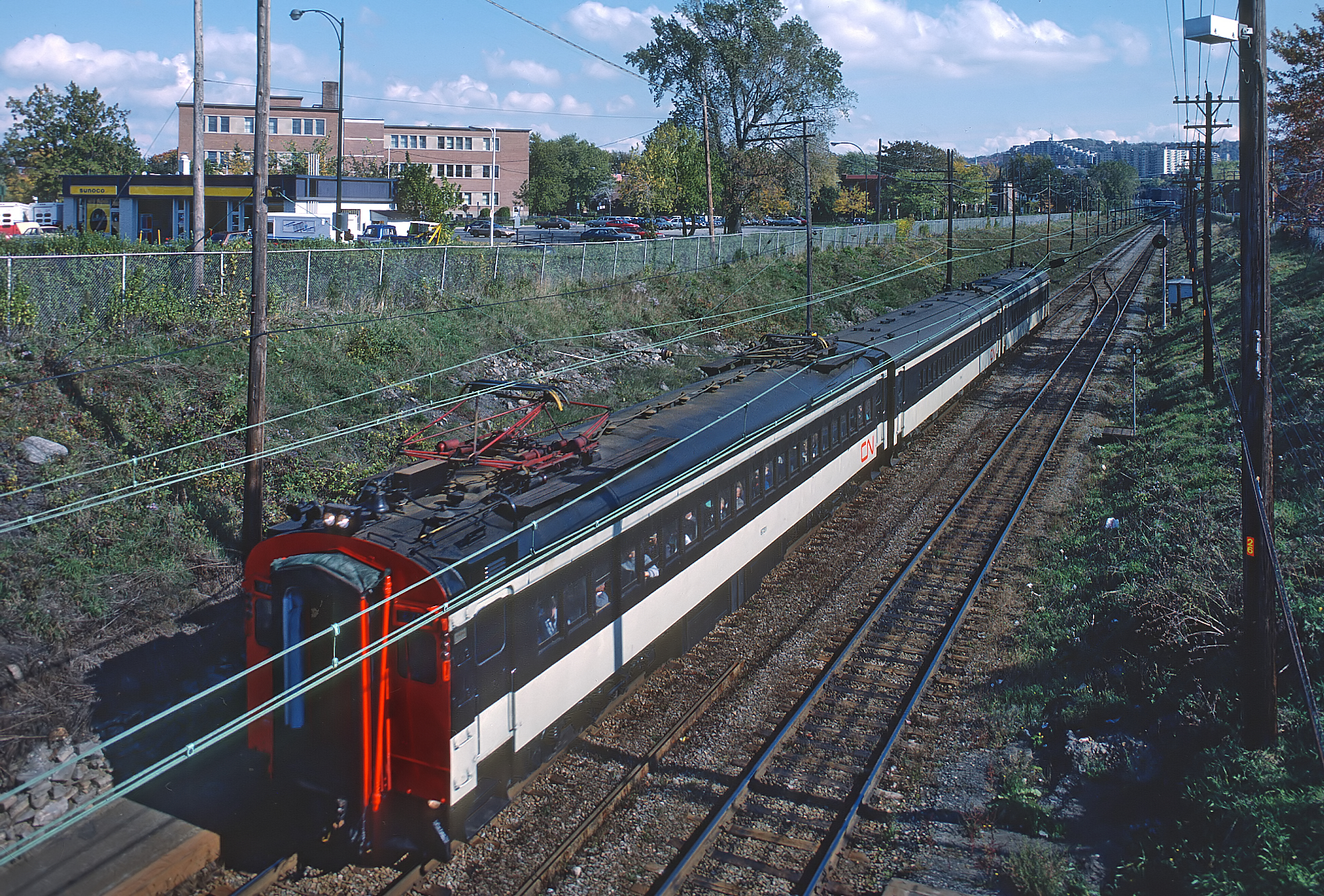
- CN No. 6731 on the Deux-Montagnes line in 1987
- In service: 1952–1995
- Manufacturer: Canadian Car and Foundry
- Constructed: 1952
- Entered service: 1953
- Number built: Motor: 6; Trailer: 12
- Design code: Motor: EP-59a; Trailer: ET-59a
- Capacity: Motor: 88; Trailer: 84
- Operator: Canadian National Railway

Specifications
- Car body construction: Steel
- Maximum speed: 65 mph (105 km/h)
- Weight: Motor: 157,000 lb (71,000 kg); Trailer: 92,000 lb (42,000 kg)
- Power output: Motor: 1,050 hp (780 kW)
- Tractive effort: Motor: 15,200 lbf (68 kN)
- Electric system: 2400 V DC catenary
- Current collection: Pantograph
- AAR wheel arrangement: Motor: B-B
- Track gauge: 4 ft 8 1/2 in (1,435 mm) standard gauge

The CN electric multiple units were a fleet of electric multiple unit (EMU) railcars built in 1952 by Canadian Car and Foundry (CCF) for the Canadian National Railway for use on the Deux-Montagnes line in Montreal. The cars remained in use until June 2, 1995 when the reconstruction started. The MR-90 entered service late in 1995. Several have been preserved.

== Design ==
CCF built six motor cars and twelve trailers. As designed the motor cars seated 88 while the trailers, which included restrooms, seated 84. Vestibules connected the cars. The standard formation consisted of a motor car and two trailers; the motor cars always led outbound trains from Central Station. The interiors were green pastel with maroon upholstery. Exteriors were standard Canadian National: green with orange ends; later repainted gray and black with red ends. The doors and pantographs (on motor cars only) were painted red. The cars used 2400 V DC via overhead collection.

== History ==
CCF delivered the cars in June and they entered service on September 23, 1952. The cars were originally numbered M-1 through M-6 (motor cars) and T-1 through T-12 (trailers). The motors cars were renumbered 6730–6735 in 1969, while the trailer cars were renumbered 6739–6749. All but four cars survived to the final day of service for that generation of trains on June 2, 1995. The four losses over their 43-year service life were:

- Motor cars 6731 and 6732, née M-2 and M-3 respectively, were both destroyed by fire; 6731 at Deux-Montagnes in fall 1994; and 6732 between 1975 and 1980.
- Trailer car 6748, née T-10, was retired in 1993, a victim of severe corrosion. Being deemed beyond economical rebuilding, it gave up structural components to its sister cars at their last major rebuild in 1989–1990.
- Trailer car T-8, destroyed in a head-on collision with a freight train near Roxboro station July 23, 1960, in which one passenger was killed and over 70 others injured.

The 14 remaining cars were preserved as follows:

- Motor car 6734 and trailer 6742, née M-5 and T-3 respectively, at Exporail, St. Constant, Quebec.
- Trailer cars 6740, 6741, 6744, 6747, née T-1, T-2, T-5, and T-9 respectively, at Alberta Prairie Railway Excursions, Stettler, Alberta.
- Trailer cars 6739, 6743, 6745, 6749. née T-12, T-4, T-6, and T-11 respectively, at Conway Scenic Railroad, Conway, New Hampshire.
- Motor cars 6730, 6733, 6735, and trailer car 6746, née M-1, M-4, M-6, and T-7 respectively, at South Carolina Railroad Museum, Winnsboro, South Carolina.

== See also ==
- Canadian National Class Z-1-a
- Canadian National Class Z-4-a
