= Port of Montreal railway =

Port of Montreal Railway
Overview
- Headquarters: Montreal, Quebec
- Locale: Montreal, Quebec, Canada
- Dates of operation: 1907–

Technical
- Track gauge: 4 ft 8 1/2 in (1,435 mm) standard gauge

The Port of Montreal Railway is a terminal railroad operating in Montreal, Canada.

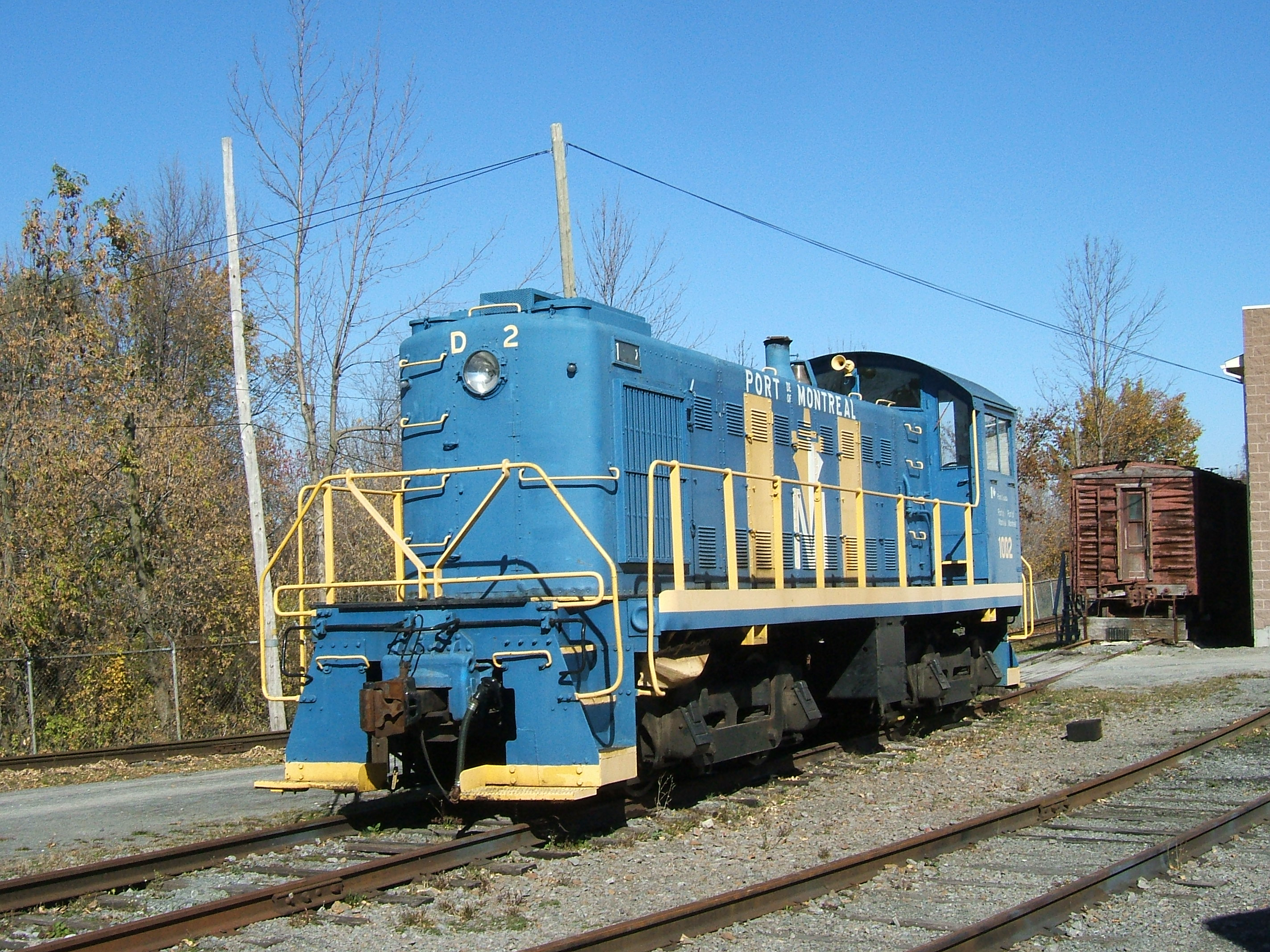
Former Port of Montreal locomotive preserved at Exporail.

Founded in 1907, it is owned by the governmental entity the Montreal Port Authority. However, its operations are run separately from the port as a for-profit arm.

About 100 km (60 miles) of track are under the railroad's jurisdiction, and junctions are present with both CN and Canadian Pacific. Containers are ferried by rail to the interchange area or loaded directly onto trains. An average of about 45 trains operate per week.

As of 2015, the railway has a maintenance team of about 20 people, working 365 days a year. The railway handles about 60 to 80 trains per week over the 100 km of track, with 168 switch points to be maintained. The port entrance off Boucherville Street sees about 2500 trucks daily that enter or exit the facility.

== Expansion ==
In 2017, an investment of $18.4 million (Canadian dollars) from the Canadian government, the Quebec government and the Port Authority allowed the construction of an additional 6km of track, to handle in increase in container volumes at the Port. As of the date of the announcement, around 45 % of the container cargo at the port was shipped out by rail.

== Roster ==
In 2010, the railway had a fleet of 6 diesel electric locomotives.

As of September 2012, the Port had three EMD MP15AC (numbered 8403, 8405 and 8406), three newly acquired Railpower RP20BDs, arriving in 2010 and 2012 (numbered 1001, 1002 and 1004) and two yard slugs (ex-Grand Trunk Western GP9). The newer PR20BD locomotives are to be mated to the yard slugs.
