= Canadian National Class Z-1-a =

Electric locomotive

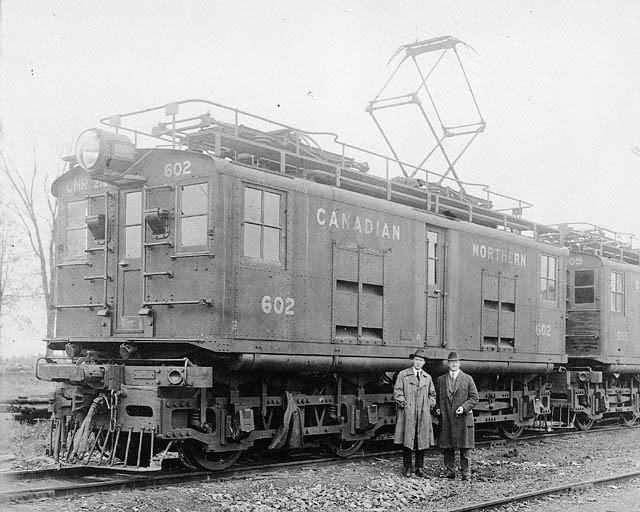
- CN Boxcab #602
Type and origin
- Power type: Electric
- Designer: General Electric
- Model: 0440-E-166-4-GE-228-A
- Build date: 1917
- Total produced: 6
Specifications
- Configuration
  - AAR: B+B
  - UIC: Bo+Bo
- Gauge: 4 ft 8 1/2 in (1,435 mm) standard gauge
- Loco weight: 174000 lb (78925 kg; 79 t; 78 long tons; 87 short tons)
- Electric system/s: 2400 V DC
- Current pickup: Pantograph from catenary
Performance figures
- Maximum speed: 55 mph (89 km/h)
- Tractive effort
  - Continuous: 19600 lbf (87 kN)
Career
- Operators: Canadian Northern Railway Canadian National Railway
- Class: Z-1-a
- Numbers: CNoR 600–605 → CNR 9100–9105 → 100–105 → 6710–6715
- Last run: 1995
- Withdrawn: 1993–1995
- Preserved: 6710, 6711, 6714 & 6715; formerly 6712
- Disposition: 4 preserved; remainder scrapped

The Canadian National Class Z-1-a was a series of six electric locomotives built by General Electric for the Canadian Northern Railway in 1917. They were used in service through the Mount Royal Tunnel in Montreal until retirement in 1995, operating for 76 years, 7 months and 12 days.

They were classified as a boxcab, model 0440-E-166-4-GE-228-A by General Electric, delivered new to the Canadian Northern Railway. They were very similar to 6 units built for the Butte, Anaconda and Pacific Railway, as was the electrification system. Each unit weighed 174,000 lb (79,000 kg). They had a B+B wheel arrangement, a maximum continuous tractive effort of 19,600 lbf (87 kN), capable of operating at a maximum safe speed of 55 mph (89 km/h).

They were given the following classification: Class: Z-1-a by the CNoR in 1919; CN continued to use the same classification after 1919. One unit, CN 6713, was retired in 1993 and was then cannibalized for spare parts to supply the remaining class Z-1-a locomotives. Another, CN 6712, was donated to the Town of Mount Royal, and was stored at that city's municipal garage pending selection of a suitable display site. Such a site was never found; the unit was cannibalized and scrapped in 2011.

== Preservation ==
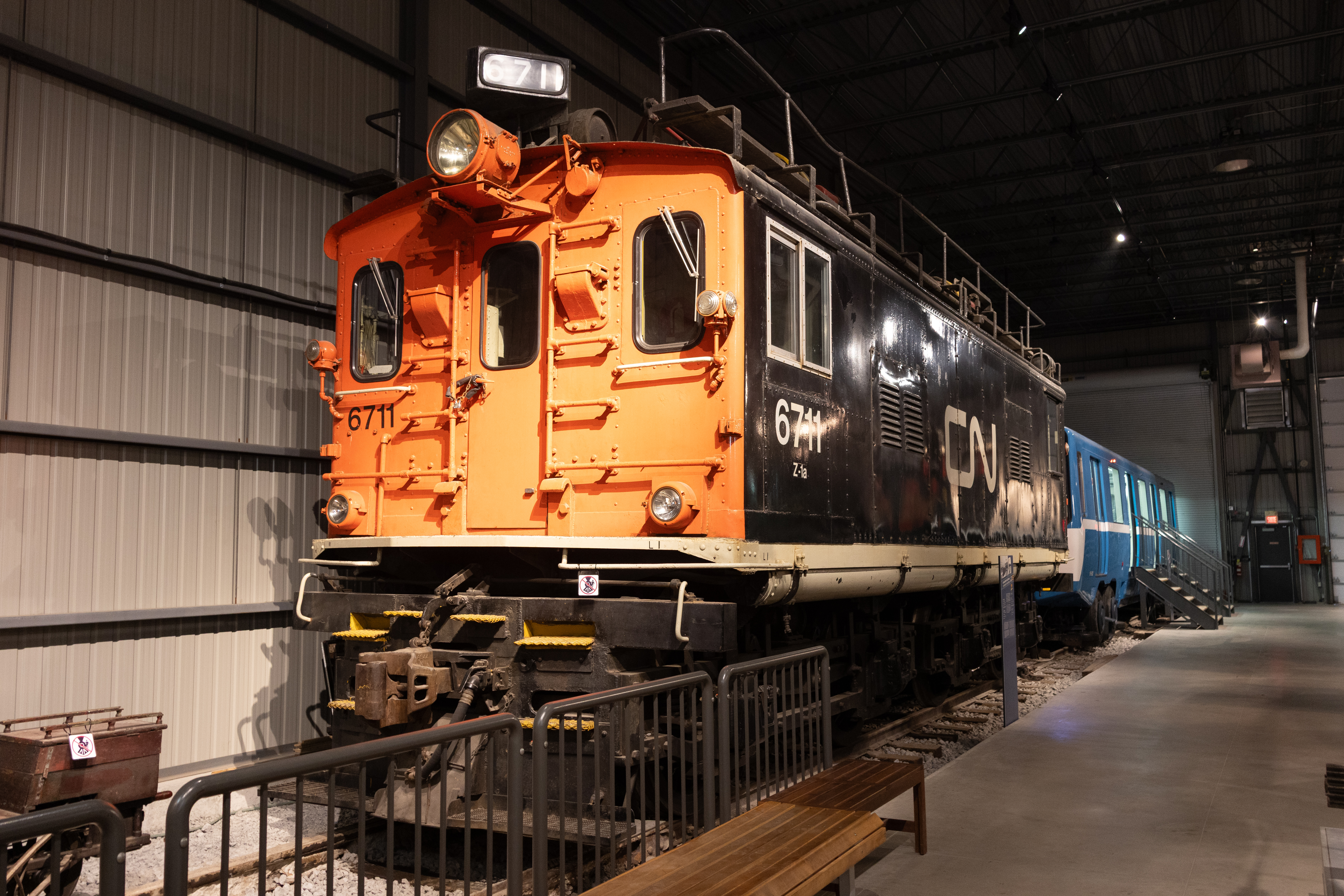
Locomotive 6711 preserved at Exporail

Four locomotives were preserved.

- CNoR600/CNR9100/100/6710 - Sits in Parc Bélair in Deux-Montagnes, Quebec. Pulled the last train with 6711; fully restored in 2020 at display site.
- CNoR601/CNR9101/101/6711 — Preserved at Exporail in Delson, Quebec. Pulled the last train with 6710; also pulled first train into tunnel October 21, 1918.
- CNoR604/CNR9104/104/6714 — Was preserved at the Connecticut Trolley Museum in East Windsor, Connecticut. Built in Canada, at Canadian General Electric, Peterborough, Ontario. Parts were shipped from Schenectady, New York. Transferred to the Halton County Radial Railway in Milton, Ontario in 2023.
- CNoR605/CNR9105/105/6715 — Preserved at the Canada Science and Technology Museum in Ottawa, Ontario. Built entirely in Canada, at Canadian General Electric, Peterborough, Ontario.

== See also ==
- Canadian National Class Z-4-a
- CN electric multiple unit
