= Ville-Émard =

- Neighbourhood
- Location of Ville-Émard in Montreal
- Coordinates: 45.45572°N 73.59258°W
- Country: Canada
- Province: Quebec
- City: Montreal
- Borough: Le Sud-Ouest

Area
  - Total: 0.45 sq mi (1.16 km^{2})

Population (2011)
  - Total: 18,603
- Postal Code: H4E
- Area codes: 514, 438

Ville-Émard (French pronunciation: [vil emaʁ]) is a neighbourhood located in the Sud-Ouest borough of Montreal, Quebec, Canada.

== Geography ==
This neighbourhood is bordered by the Aqueduct Canal to the east as far north as Desmarchais Boulevard where it meets Côte-Saint-Paul, after which the eastern boundary runs north along Monk Boulevard to the Lachine Canal, the community's northern edge. The western boundary runs south along Irwin Street and Irwin Avenue to Angrignon Park, the outer boundaries of which form the community's western and southern edges. This neighbourhood is accessible via the Angrignon exit on Quebec Autoroute 20 and the De La Vérendrye exit on Quebec Autoroute 15.

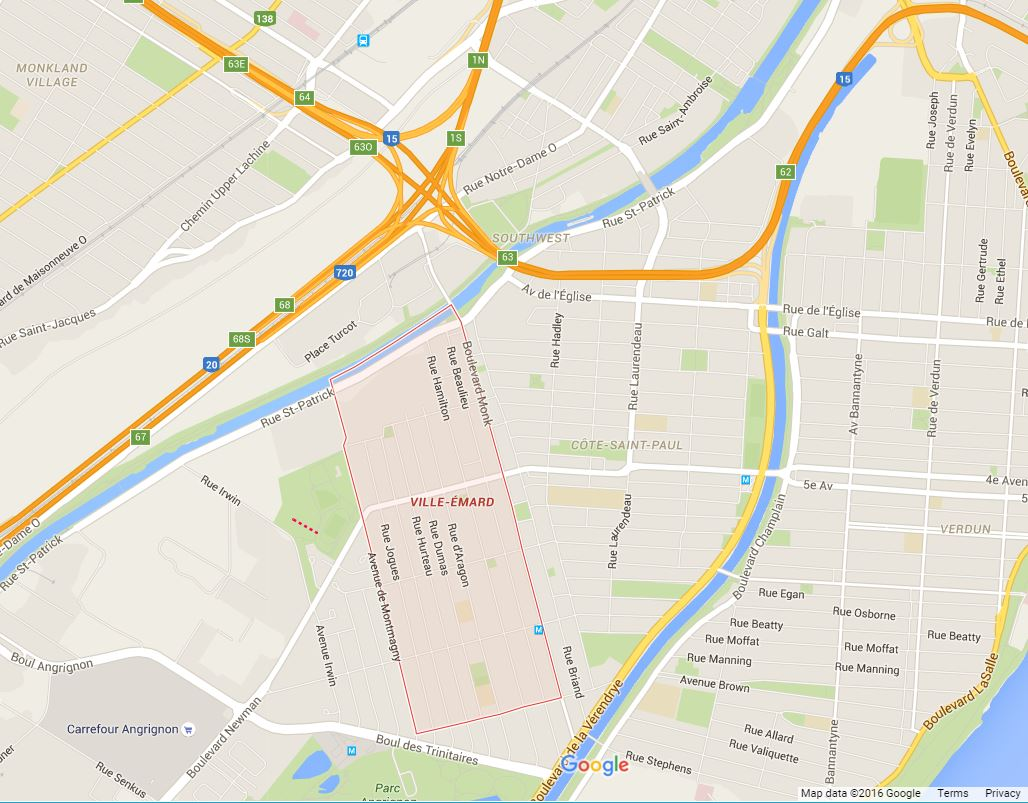

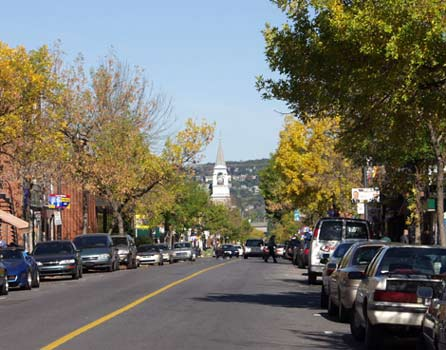
View looking north on Monk Boulevard

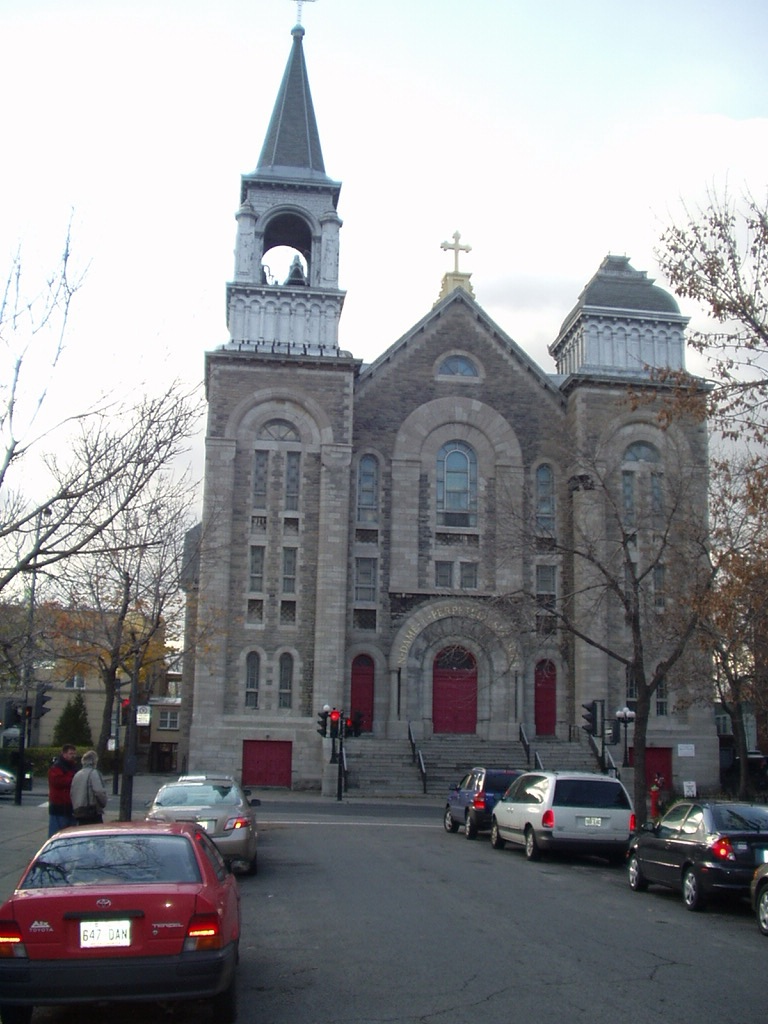
Since 2014, the Paradoxe Theater is housed in Notre-Dame-Du-Perpétuel-Secours Church, on Monk Boulevard

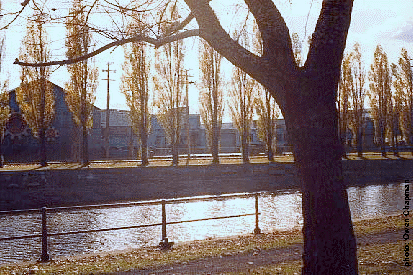
View of the Canal Lachine, near Monk Boulevard

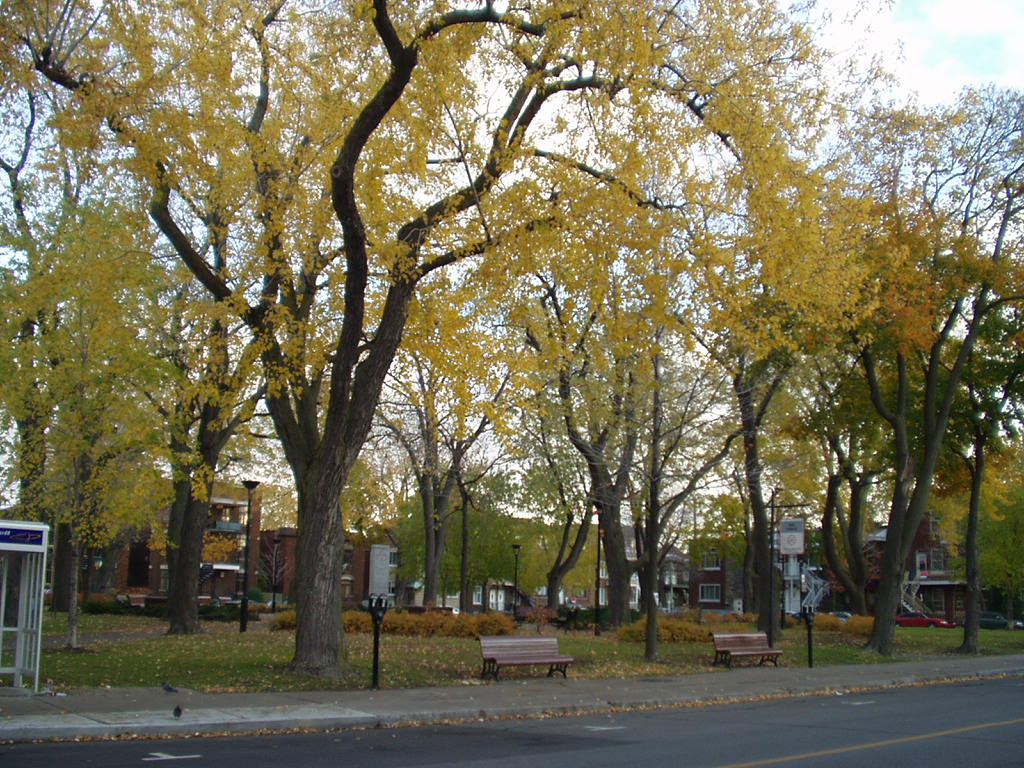
Garneau Square in the fall

== History ==
Ville-Émard was originally part of the concession of Côte Saint-Paul, granted by the Sulpician Order, seigneurs of the Island of Montreal, in 1662. The concession included modern-day Ville-Émard, Côte-Saint-Paul, and the Turcot Yards, and was used for agriculture. The Lachine Canal bisected the area in 1825 and disrupted agricultural activities.

The Lachine Canal brought numerous factories to the region, drawn by the availability of transport and water power. The two first streets of Ville-Émard were Hamilton and Beaulieu, opened up by Éphrem Hudon in 1871. By 1875, several factories were present. The core of the modern-day neighbourhood, a farm belonging to W. B. Davidson, was sold by his widow Ann Ryan to entrepreneur Joseph-Ulric Émard. He subdivided the land, rapidly selling the properties, and created the Compagnie des Terrains de la banlieue de Montréal with his business partners, Messrs. Ouimet, Monk, Swail and Gohier.

Shortly after the creation of the Village of Côte-Saint-Paul in 1874, this area separated as the Parish Municipality of Côte-Saint-Paul in 1878. In 1902, it became the Village du Boulevard-Saint-Paul, and in 1908, Joseph-Ulric Émard, who had become the mayor, renamed the town for himself. Shops and municipal services opened along Monk Boulevard. The parish of Notre-Dame-du-Perpétuel-Secours was founded in 1906 under Curé Jean-Moïse Jolicoeur.

Clockwise from the north, the town of Ville-Émard was bounded by the Lachine Canal, St. Louis Street (now Rue Briand), First Avenue (now Rue le Caron), a property line just north of Rielle Street (now Rue Laurendeau), the property line behind the lots on the west side of Frontenac Street (now Rue Leprohon), the north bank of the Aqueduct Canal, and the boundary with the parish of Lachine (approximately the same as the boundary between the modern borough and LaSalle).

In 1910, Ville-Emard was annexed to the city of Montreal at the same time as its neighbour Côte-Saint-Paul. Historically a working-class neighbourhood, it continues to evolve with new condo and other housing developments.

The vast English-style Angrignon Park was opened on the former Crawford family farm in 1927.

The metro arrived in Ville-Émard in 1978, with the construction of Angrignon, Monk, and Jolicoeur stations.

Ville-Émard became part of the borough of Le Sud-Ouest in 2002.

== Infrastructure ==
Ville-Émard is served by Monk station on the Montreal Metro's Green Line. Angrignon station is also located nearby in Angrignon Park. It is crossed and bordered by the Lachine and Aqueduct Canal. Various bicycle paths run alongside the canals.

Angrignon Park, one of the most important urban parks in Montreal, is located near the southern tip of the neighbourhood. The Maison de la culture Marie-Uguay as well as the Marie-Uguay library are situated in Ville-Émard, as is École secondaire Honoré-Mercier.

== Notable people ==
- Rychard Campeau, professional hockey player (Philadelphia Blazer's WHA)
- Albert Millaire, actor and theatre person
- Alain Lefèvre, classical pianist
- Marina Orsini, actor (cinema and television)
- Robin Philpot, polemicist, author
- Gilles Groulx, film director
- Mario Lemieux, NHL ice hockey player
- Claude Ryan, politician and journalist
- Alain Stanké, publisher
- Patrick Traverse, professional hockey player
- Marie Uguay, poet, neighbourhood's library and cultural center named after her
- Vittorio Rossi, (playwright, actor, director)
- Maurice "Mad Dog" Vachon (pro wrestler)
- Korine Côté, comedian
