= Angrignon station =

Montreal Metro station

Angrignon
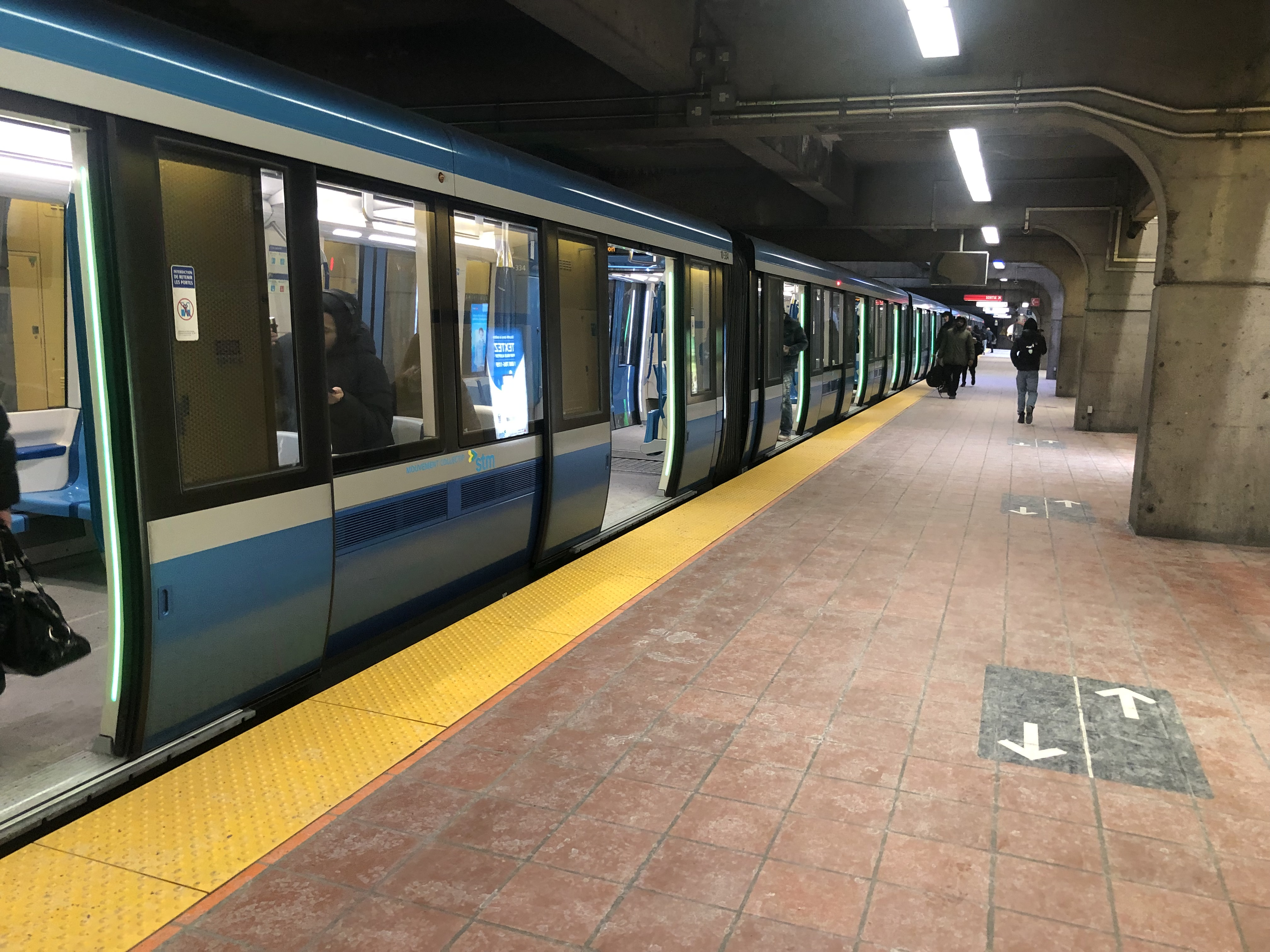

General information
- Location: 3500 Boul des Trinitaires, Montréal, QC H4E 4J3; Canada
- Coordinates: 45°26′46″N 73°36′13″W
- Operator: Société de transport de Montréal
- Platforms: 2 side platforms
- Tracks: 2
- Connections: Terminus Angrignon

Construction
- Depth: 4.3 metres (14 feet 1 inch), shallowest, tie with Longueuil–Université-de-Sherbrooke)
- Accessible: Yes
- Architect: Jean-Louis Beaulieu

Other information
- Fare zone: ARTM: A

History
- Opened: 3 September 1978

Passengers
- 2024: 4,291,952 ▲10.83%
- Rank: 21 of 68

Services
Preceding station	Montreal Metro	Following station
Terminus	Green Line	Monk toward Honoré-Beaugrand
Location

Angrignon station (French pronunciation: [ɑ̃ɡʁiɲɔ̃]) is a Montreal Metro station in Le Sud-Ouest borough of Montreal, Quebec. It is operated by the Société de transport de Montréal (STM) and is the western terminus of the Green Line. The station includes a large bus terminus for buses to southwest Montreal, the West Island (Dorval), and South Western Quebec. It opened in 1978.

== Architecture ==
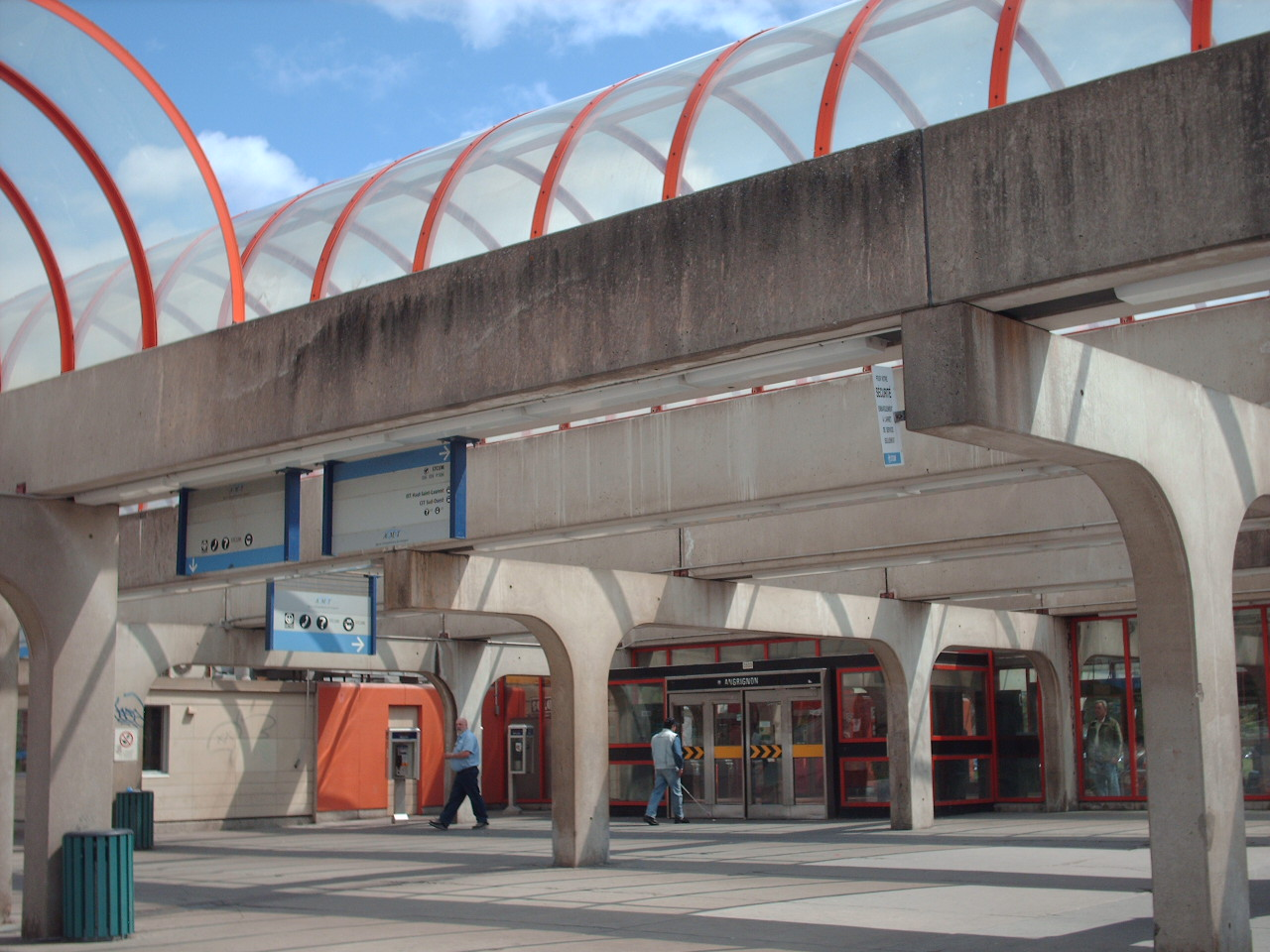
Station kiosk

Angrignon station is built with windows encasing the tracks and side platforms, which creates a very light and airy environment. Jean-Louis Beaulieu received an award from the Ordre des architectes du Québec for the design of the station.

The station is equipped with the MétroVision information screens which displays news, commercials, and the time till the next train.

== Artwork ==
On the platforms, Les Boîtes vivantes by Shelley Miller is a ceramic photography montage of Parc Angrignon's Quartiers d’hiver. This was the winter residence of animals of the Jardin des merveilles (Garden of Wonders) - a former urban zoo in Parc La Fontaine. The work was installed in 2022 as part of work to make the station accessible.

== Station improvements ==
In October 2019, work began to make the station universally accessible with the installation of elevators at a cost of $18m. As part of the project, the glass walls of the station were replaced to improve watertightness. A piece of artwork was also installed. The work was completed on December 9, 2022, making it the 24th accessible station.

== Origin of the name ==
Jean-Baptiste Arthur Angrignon was alderman of the district of Saint-Paul and a member of the Executive Committee of the city of Montreal. He oversaw the development of what is now Parc Angrignon on what was land that belonged to the Crawford family. The area was named after him in 1927.

== Nearby points of interest ==
- Carrefour Angrignon shopping centre
- Parc Angrignon
- Ferme Angrignon zoo

== Terminus Angrignon ==
Terminus Angrignon
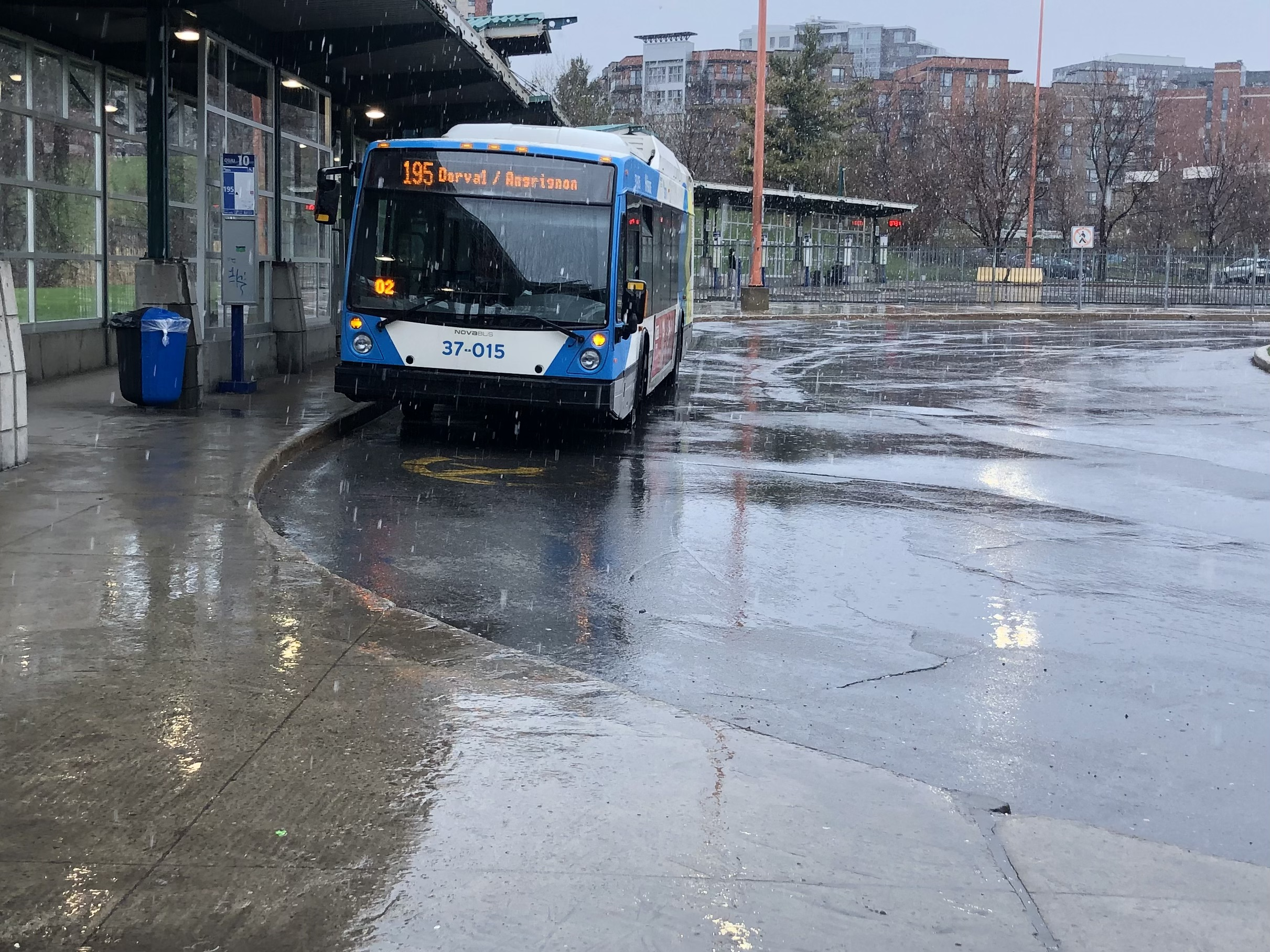

General information
- Location: 3500, boul. des Trinitaires LaSalle, Quebec Canada
- Coordinates: 45°26′47″N 73°36′15″W
- Owner: ARTM
- Operator: Société de transport de Montréal
- Bus operators: STM bus; Exo bus services

Construction
- Parking: 733 park and ride spaces
- Cycle facilities: 90 place racks

Other information
- Fare zone: ARTM: A
- Website: Terminus Angrignon

Passengers
- 2016: 6,168,600 (Exo)
Location

This large bus terminal is a facility of the ARTM. One area has bus bays assigned to suburban commuter buses from southwestern Quebec, with three bus loops being used by the STM for routes that service southwest Montreal and the West Island. They also operate an adjoining park and ride lot.

=== Connecting bus routes ===
Société de transport de Montréal
No.	Route	Connects to	Service times / notes
35	Griffintown	Monk; Place-Saint-Henri; Square-Victoria-OACI; McGill	Daily
36	Monk	Monk; Place-Saint-Henri; Square-Victoria-OACI	Daily
37	Jolicoeur	Jolicoeur; LaSalle	Daily
101	Saint-Patrick	Lionel-Groulx; Terminus Lafleur / Newman; LaSalle	Weekdays only
106	Newman	Terminus Lafleur / Newman	Daily
110	Centrale	LaSalle	Daily
113	Lapierre	Terminus Lafleur / Newman	Daily
114	Angrignon		Daily
195	Dorval / Angrignon	Dorval	Daily
198	Broadway	Dorval	Daily
350 ☾	Verdun / LaSalle	Frontenac; Bonaventure; Gare Centrale; Terminus Centre-ville; Lucien-L'Allier; Atwater; Lionel-Groulx; LaSalle; De L'Église; Verdun; Jolicoeur; Monk	Night service
Exo Richelain / Roussillon sector
No.	Route	Connects to	Service times / notes
556	Delson - Montréal (Angrignon - Cégep A-Laurendeau)	Terminus Georges-Gagné; Terminus Lafleur / Newman	Weekdays only
Exo Sud-Ouest sector
No.	Route	Connects to	Service times / notes
1	Valleyfield - Beauharnois - Châteauguay - Montreal	Terminus Châteauguay; Terminus Lafleur / Newman	Daily
21	Châteauguay - Montreal	Terminus Châteauguay; Terminus Lafleur / Newman	Weekdays, peak only
23	Châteauguay - Montreal	Terminus Lafleur / Newman	Weekdays, peak only
25	Châteauguay - Montreal	Terminus Lafleur / Newman	Weekdays, peak only
26	Châteauguay - Montreal	Terminus Châteauguay; Terminus Lafleur / Newman	Peak AM service only
31	Châteauguay - Montreal	Terminus Châteauguay; Terminus Lafleur / Newman	Daily
32	Châteauguay - Montreal	Terminus Châteauguay; Terminus Lafleur / Newman	Daily
98	Kahnawake - Montreal	Terminus Lafleur / Newman	Weekdays only
111	Haut-Saint-Laurent	Terminus Centre-ville; Gare Centrale; Bonaventure; Terminus Lafleur / Newman; Terminus Châteauguay	Only weekdays peak service goes to Downtown Montreal

== See also ==
- List of park and rides in Greater Montreal
