= Lucien-L'Allier station =

Lucien-L'Allier station may refer to:

- Lucien-L'Allier station (Montreal Metro), a rapid transit station in Montreal
- Lucien-L'Allier station (Exo), a commuter rail station in Montreal
