= De l'Église station =

Montreal Metro station

De l'Église
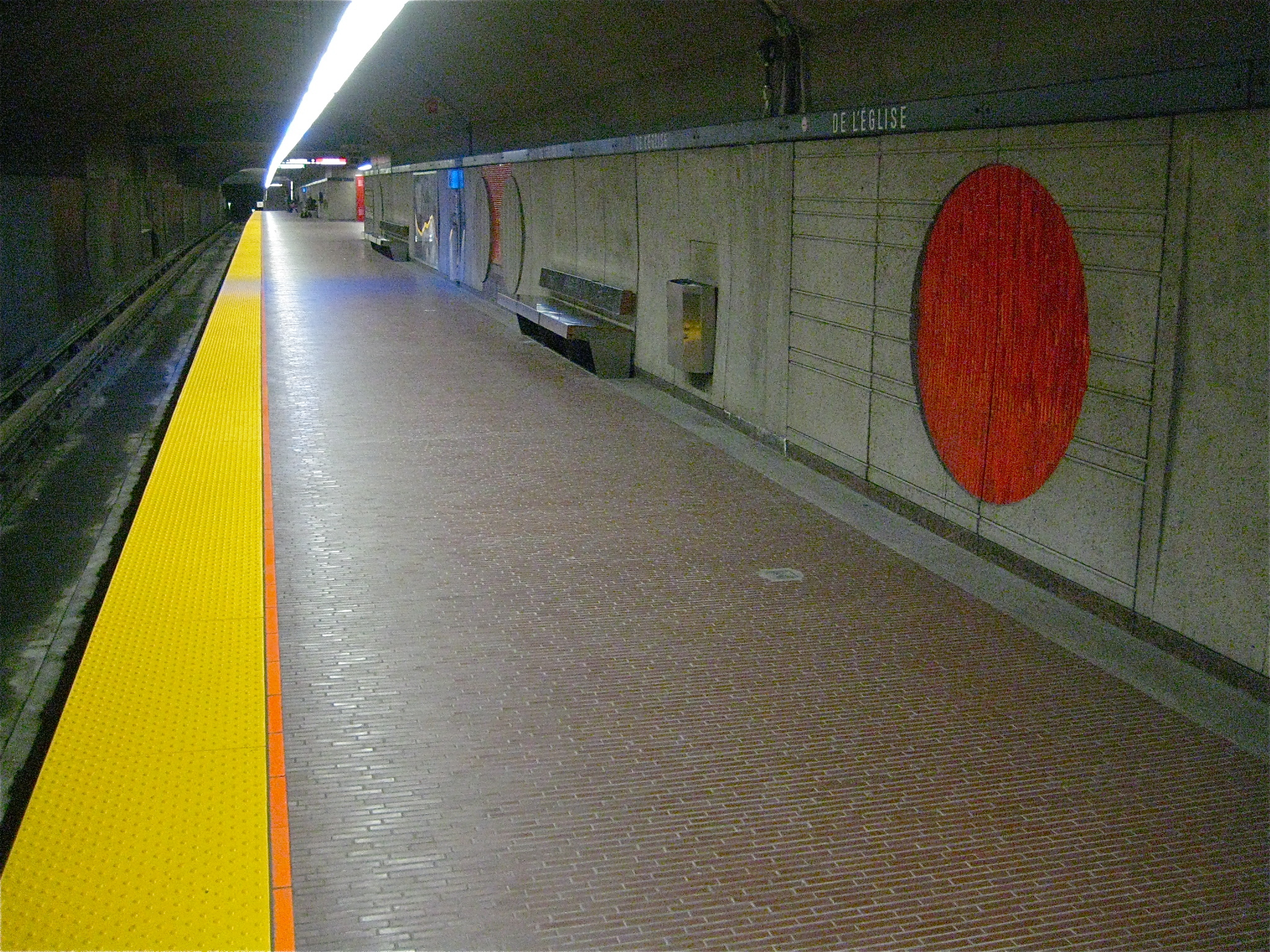

General information
- Location: 250 Rue Galt and 133 av. de l'Église; Verdun, Quebec H4G 2P4; Canada
- Coordinates: 45°27′46″N 73°34′01″W
- Operator: Société de transport de Montréal
- Platforms: 2 split platforms
- Tracks: 2
- Connections: STM bus

Construction
- Depth: 19.8 m (65 ft) (Honoré-Beaugrand); 25.6 m (84 ft) (Angrignon platform), 5th deepest
- Accessible: No
- Architect: Lemay et Leduc

Other information
- Fare zone: ARTM: A

History
- Opened: 3 September 1978

Passengers
- 2024: 2,716,812 ▲5.65%
- Rank: 38 of 68

Services
Preceding station	Montreal Metro	Following station
Verdun toward Angrignon	Green Line	LaSalle toward Honoré-Beaugrand
Location

De l'Église station (French pronunciation: [də leɡliz]) is a Montreal Metro station in the borough of Verdun in Montreal, Quebec, Canada. It is operated by the Société de transport de Montréal (STM) and serves the Green Line. The station opened on September 3, 1978, as part of the extension of the Green Line westward to Angrignon station.

== Architecture and art ==
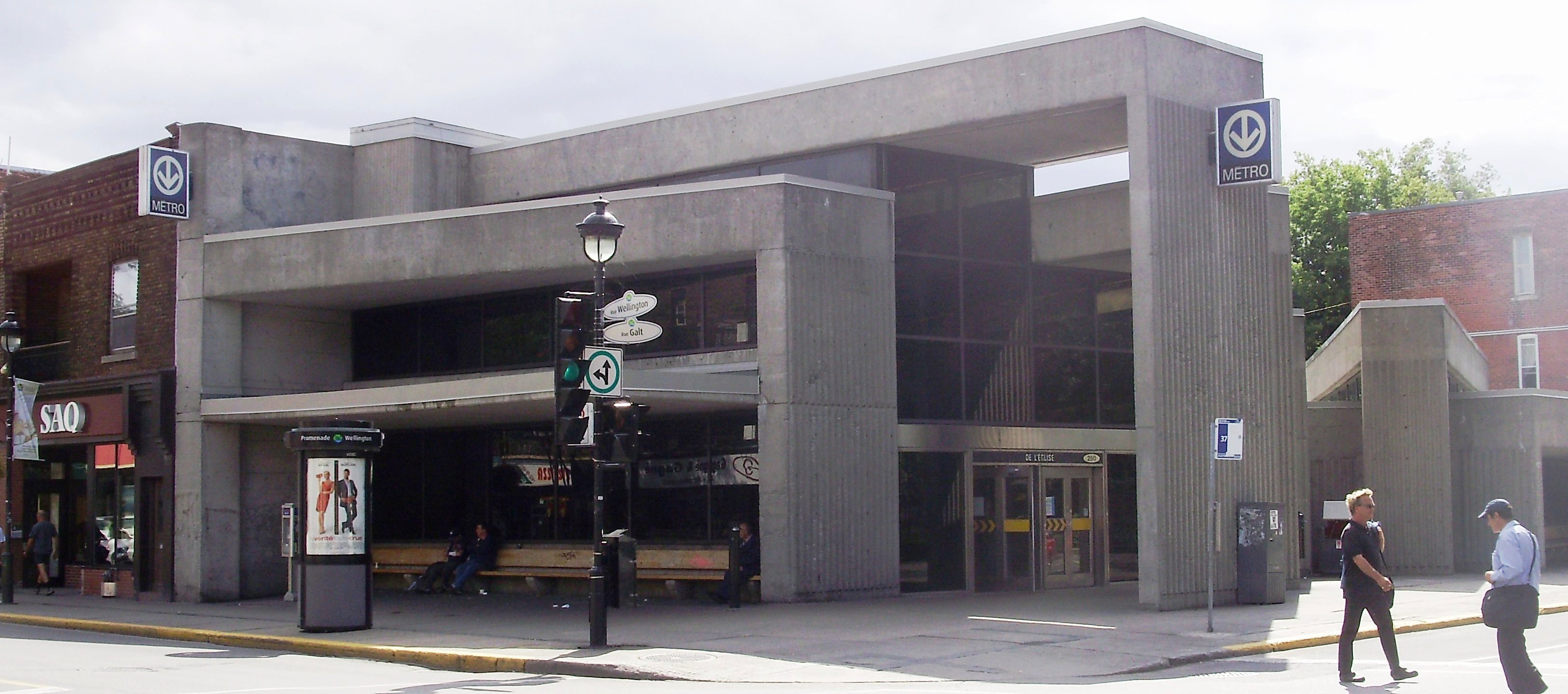
Station's kiosks

Designed by Jean-Maurice Dubé, it was planned as a normal side platform station. However, during the station's construction, a cave-in of the surrounding weak Utica Shale formation made it necessary to build the station with a narrower profile. It is therefore built with stacked platforms, with the Honoré-Beaugrand platform above and Angrignon below, and both directions opening to the left instead of the usual right. There are two accesses, one in the centre and one at the western end of the station, with separate ticket halls.

The station is decorated with a series of circular motifs in ceramic tile on the lower levels and concrete bas-reliefs in the upper levels by Claude Théberge and Antoine D. Lamarche.

In 2022, the STM's Universal Accessibility Report noted that design work to make the station accessible was underway.

== Origin of the name ==
This station is named for Rue de l'Église, in turn named for the Église Notre-Dame-des-Sept-Douleurs near the station. (The roadway continues into Côte-Saint-Paul under the name Avenue de l'Église, itself named for the Église Saint-Paul in that neighbourhood.) This roadway has existed since at least 1834; the portion in Verdun, previously called rue du Pavillon, became known as rue de l'Église or Church Street following the construction of the first Église Notre-Dame-des-Sept-Douleurs in 1899.

== Connecting bus routes ==
Société de transport de Montréal
No.	Route	Connects to	Service times / notes
12	Île-des-Soeurs	Île-des-Soeurs	Daily
38	De l'Église	Vendôme; LaSalle	Daily
61	Wellington	LaSalle; Charlevoix; Bonaventure	Daily Some rush hour services start and end at Charlevoix metro
71	Pointe-Saint-Charles	Guy-Concordia	Daily
350 ☾	Verdun / LaSalle	Frontenac; Bonaventure; Gare Centrale; Terminus Centre-ville; Lucien-L'Allier; Atwater; Lionel-Groulx; LaSalle; Verdun; Jolicoeur; Monk	Night service

== Nearby points of interest ==
- Hôpital de Verdun
- Verdun Auditorium
- Parc Thérien
- Health Canada
- Plage de Verdun
