= Green Line (Montreal Metro) =

Metro line in Montreal, Quebec, Canada

- A Green Line MPM-10 train arrives at Peel station.

Overview
- Native name: Ligne verte (French)
- Line number: 1
- Locale: Montreal, Quebec, Canada.
- Termini: Angrignon (west); Honoré-Beaugrand (east)
- Stations: 27

Service
- Type: Rapid transit
- System: Montreal Metro
- Operator: Société de transport de Montréal (STM)
- Depot(s): Angrignon, Beaugrand (for MR-73 and MPM-10); Centre d'attachement Duvernay (connected to line 2), Centre d'attachement Viau (for maintenance of way equipment)
- Rolling stock: Bombardier Transportation MR-73 cars Bombardier/Alstom MPM-10 (Azur) trains

History
- Opened: October 14, 1966; 60 years ago
- June 6, 1976: Opening of eastern extension to Honoré-Beaugrand
- September 3, 1978: Opening of western extension to Angrignon

Technical
- Line length: 22.1 km (13.7 mi)
- Track gauge: 1,435 mm (4 ft 8 1/2 in) standard gauge
- Electrification: Guide bar, 750 V DC
- Operating speed: 50–70 km/h (31–43 mph)
Route map
Green Line highlighted in green

The Green Line (French: Ligne verte, pronounced [liɲ vɛʁt]), also known as Line 1 (Ligne 1), is one of the four lines of the Montreal Metro in Montreal, Quebec, Canada. The line runs through the commercial section of downtown Montreal underneath Boulevard de Maisonneuve, formerly Rue de Montigny. It runs mainly on a northeast to southwest axis with a connection to the Orange and Yellow Lines at Berri–UQAM, and with the Orange Line west of downtown at Lionel-Groulx.

The section between Atwater and Frontenac was part of the initial network; the line was extended to Honoré-Beaugrand in 1976 to provide easy access to 1976 Summer Olympics sites. It was extended to Angrignon in 1978. All but three stations — De l'Église, Lionel-Groulx, and Charlevoix — are side platform stations.

== History ==
On November 3, 1961, Montreal City Council approved an initial Metro network 16 kilometres (9.9 mi) in length. The main line, or Line 1 (Green Line) was to pass between the two most important arteries, Saint Catherine and Sherbrooke streets, more or less under the De Maisonneuve Boulevard. It would extend between the English-speaking west at Atwater station and French-speaking east at Frontenac.

Construction of the first two lines began May 23, 1962, under the supervision of the Director of Public Works, Lucien L'Allier. On August 6, 1963, it was agreed that the under construction line would be extended to Square-Victoria and Bonaventure stations, after construction costs for tunnels were lower than expected.

The first stations, found on the section between Atwater and Papineau, opened on October 14, 1966. Several smaller sections were delayed by several months. On December 19, 1966, the line was further extended from Papineau to Frontenac, and two days later came the stopover Beaudry between Berri–UQAM and Papineau. On December 20, 1967, Frédéric Back completed his art piece L'histoire de la musique à Montréal (The history of music in Montreal) in Place-des-Arts station. This commissioned piece was the first artwork completed in the Metro system.

The construction of the second phase began in 1971, when Montreal was awarded the bid to host the 1976 Summer Olympics. The goal was to have the ability to transport visitors from downtown to the Olympic Park in the east end. The opening of the section between Frontenac and Honoré-Beaugrand took place on June 6, 1976, six weeks before the start of the Summer Olympics. Green Line trains inaugurated an autopilot feature on November 8, 1976.

The third expansion phase, between Atwater and Angrignon, came into operation on September 3, 1978.

In the 2010s and 2020s, renovation work and the installation of elevators took place at many stations on the Green Line. As of 2024, ten stations on the line are accessible, including both interchange stations at Berri-UQAM and Lionel-Groulx.

In 2024, following years of studies, the STM's parent agency, the ARTM, in conjunction with the Ministère des Transports et de la Mobilité Durable du Québec and the City of Montreal began conducting surveys regarding a possible extension of the Green Line westwards towards Lachine.

== Service ==
=== Operation hours and frequency ===
The Green Line operates between 5:30 a.m. and 12:35 a.m on weekdays and Sunday, and between 5:30 a.m. and 1:05 a.m on Saturday. Trains arrive at stations every 3 to 4 minutes during peak periods, every 4 to 10 minutes during off peak periods, and every 6 to 12 minutes at weekends.

=== Rolling stock ===
At the line's opening in 1966, MR-63 cars were used on the Green Line. Upon the introduction of the MR-73 cars on the Green Line in 1976, the older MR-63 cars were used on the Orange Line. From 1985 to 2018, MR-63 cars were again used on the Green Line. With the introduction of the MPM-10 trains in 2017, the Green Line is now primarily served by MPM-10 trainsets and run alongside MR-73s during rush hour periods. The MR-63s were fully retired from the line on June 19, 2018.

In the 2020s, work to order new rolling stock to replace the MR-73 trains began. The STM also noted that to increase the capacity of the Green Line by 37%, works to upgrade garages and signalling systems would also be required.

== List of stations ==
| Station | Inauguration date | Odonym | Namesake | Transfers/Connections | Location |
|---|---|---|---|---|---|
| Angrignon | September 3, 1978 | Angrignon Boulevard; Angrignon Park | Jean-Baptiste Angrignon (Councillor of Montreal) | Terminus Angrignon | Le Sud-Ouest |
| Monk | September 3, 1978 | Monk Boulevard | James Monk (Attorney-General of Quebec) | | Le Sud-Ouest |
| Jolicoeur | September 3, 1978 | Jolicœur Street | Joseph-Moïse Jolicœur (parish priest) | | Le Sud-Ouest |
| Verdun | September 3, 1978 | De Verdun Street | Notre-Dame-de-Saverdun, France (hometown of Seigneur Zacharie Dupuis) | | Verdun |
| De l'Église | September 3, 1978 | De l'Église Avenue | Église Notre-Dame-des-Sept-Douleurs | | Verdun |
| LaSalle | September 3, 1978 | LaSalle Boulevard | Robert Cavelier de La Salle (French explorer) | | Verdun |
| Charlevoix | September 3, 1978 | Charlevoix Street | Pierre François Xavier de Charlevoix (French historian and explorer) | | Le Sud-Ouest |
| Lionel-Groulx | September 3, 1978 | Lionel-Groulx Avenue | Lionel Groulx (Quebec historian) | Orange Line | Le Sud-Ouest |
| Atwater | October 14, 1966 | Atwater Avenue | Edwin Atwater (Councillor of Montreal) | Terminus Square Cabot | Ville-Marie |
| Guy–Concordia | October 14, 1966 | Guy Street; Concordia University | Étienne Guy (landowner); Concordia salus (motto of Montreal; Prosperity Through Concord) | | Ville-Marie |
| Peel | October 14, 1966 | Rue Peel | Sir Robert Peel (28th Prime Minister of the United Kingdom) | | Ville-Marie |
| McGill | October 14, 1966 | McGill College Avenue; McGill University | James McGill (Scottish-Canadian businessman) | Réseau express métropolitain | Ville-Marie |
| Place-des-Arts | October 14, 1966 | Place des Arts | Cultural complex | | Ville-Marie |
| Saint-Laurent | October 14, 1966 | Saint Laurent Boulevard | Saint Lawrence or Saint Lawrence River | | Ville-Marie |
| Berri–UQAM | October 14, 1966 | Berri Street; Université du Québec à Montréal; De Montigny Street | Simon Després dit Le Berry; Testard de Montigny family (name given by Migeon de Branssat in 1669) | Orange Line; Yellow Line; Gare d'autocars de Montréal | Ville-Marie |
| Beaudry | December 21, 1966 | Beaudry Street | Pierre Beaudry (landowner) | | Ville-Marie |
| Papineau | October 14, 1966 | Papineau Avenue | Joseph Papineau (Quebec politician; father of Louis-Joseph Papineau) | | Ville-Marie |
| Frontenac | December 19, 1966 | Frontenac Street | Louis de Buade de Frontenac (Governor-General of New France) | | Ville-Marie |
| Préfontaine | June 6, 1976 | Préfontaine Street; Raymond-Préfontaine Park | Raymond-Fournier Préfontaine (mayor of Montreal) | | Mercier– Hochelaga- Maisonneuve |
| Joliette | June 6, 1976 | Joliette Street | Barthélemy Joliette (founder of Joliette, Quebec) | | Mercier– Hochelaga- Maisonneuve |
| Pie-IX | June 6, 1976 | Pie-IX Boulevard | Pope Pius IX | Pie-IX BRT | Mercier– Hochelaga- Maisonneuve |
| Viau | June 6, 1976 | Viau Street | Charles-Théodore Viau (Quebec cookie magnate/parish volunteer) | | Mercier– Hochelaga- Maisonneuve |
| Assomption | June 6, 1976 | De l'Assomption Boulevard | Dogma of the Assumption of Mary (proclaimed by Pope Pius XII in 1950) | | Mercier– Hochelaga- Maisonneuve |
| Cadillac | June 6, 1976 | De Cadillac Street | Antoine de la Mothe Cadillac (French explorer) | | Mercier– Hochelaga- Maisonneuve |
| Langelier | June 6, 1976 | Langelier Boulevard | François-Charles-Stanislas Langelier (mayor of Quebec City/Lieutenant-Governor of Quebec) | | Mercier– Hochelaga- Maisonneuve |
| Radisson | June 6, 1976 | Radisson Street | Pierre-Esprit Radisson (French explorer) | Terminus Radisson | Mercier– Hochelaga- Maisonneuve |
| Honoré-Beaugrand | June 6, 1976 | Honoré-Beaugrand Street | Honoré Beaugrand (Quebec author and mayor of Montreal) | Terminus Honoré-Beaugrand | Mercier– Hochelaga- Maisonneuve |

== See also ==
- Orange Line
- Yellow Line
- Blue Line
- Red Line (Line 3)
- List of Montreal Metro stations
