= Frontenac station =

Montreal Metro station

Frontenac
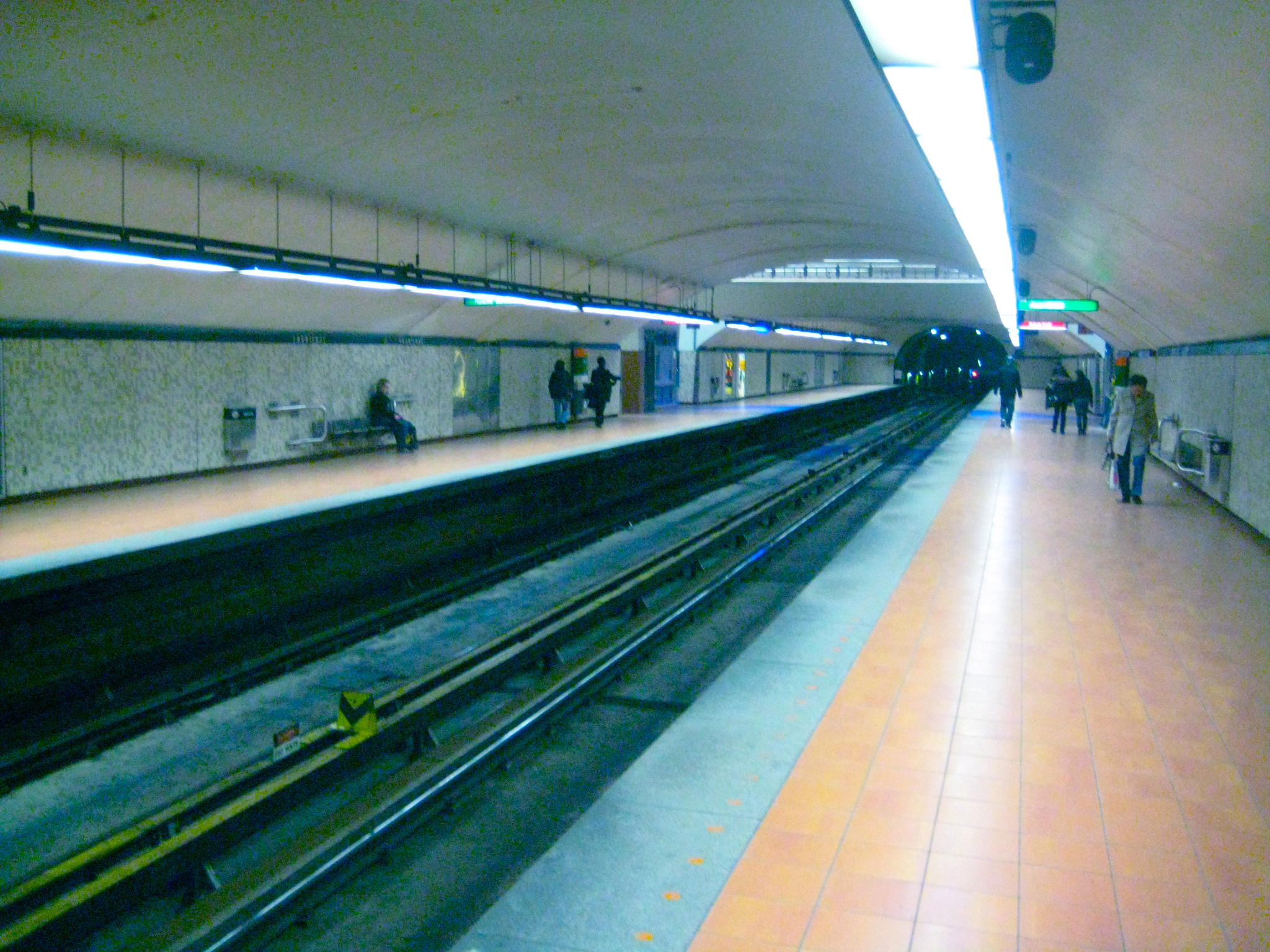

General information
- Location: 2570, rue Ontario Est; Montreal, Quebec; H2K 1W7
- Coordinates: 45°32′00″N 73°33′07″W
- Operator: Société de transport de Montréal
- Platforms: 2 side platforms
- Tracks: 2
- Connections: STM bus

Construction
- Depth: 23.2 metres (76 feet 1 inch), 10th deepest
- Accessible: No
- Architect: Robillard, Jette, et Beaudoin; Christian Bisson (kiosk built in 1999)

Other information
- Fare zone: ARTM: A

History
- Opened: 19 December 1966

Passengers
- 2024: 2,606,838 ▲13.33%
- Rank: 40 of 68

Services
Preceding station	Montreal Metro	Following station
Papineau toward Angrignon	Green Line	Préfontaine toward Honoré-Beaugrand
Location

Frontenac station (French pronunciation: [fʁɔ̃tnak]) is a Montreal Metro station in the borough of Ville-Marie in Montreal, Quebec, Canada. It is operated by the Société de transport de Montréal (STM) and serves the Green Line. It is located at 2570 Ontario Street East in the Sainte-Marie neighbourhood, part of the Centre-Sud.

== Overview ==
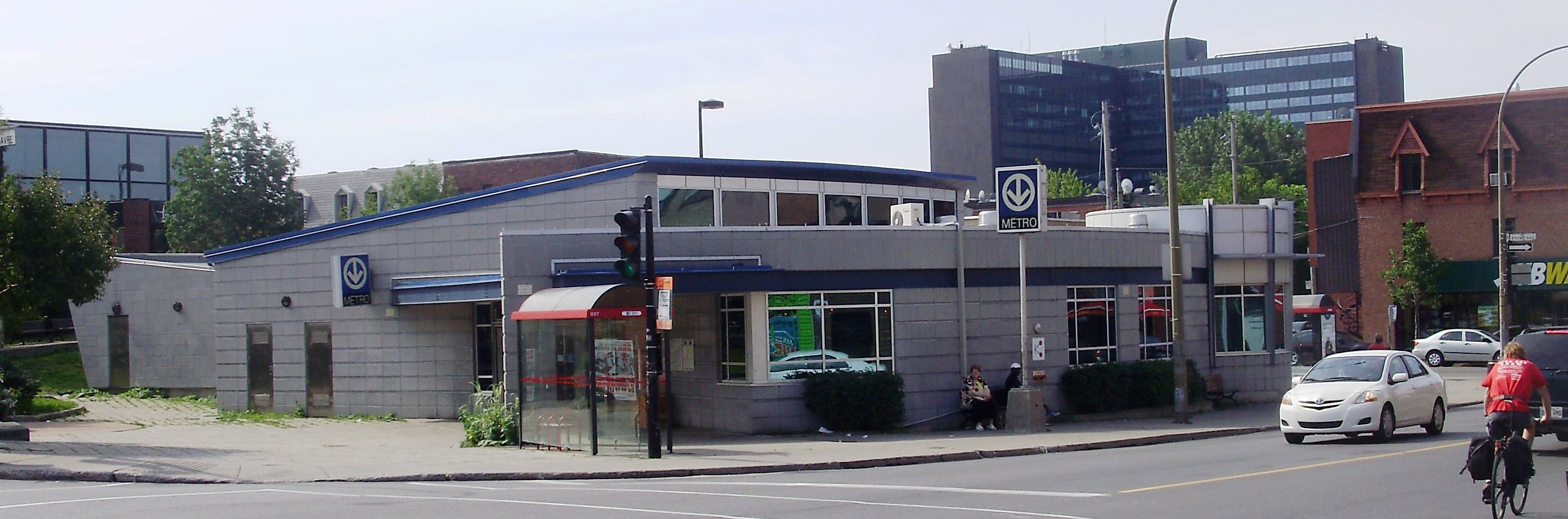
The area around the Frontenac station

Although part of the original network of the Metro, it opened two months after the rest of the system, on December 19, 1966. It served as the eastern terminus of the Green Line until the extension to Honoré-Beaugrand was completed in 1976. It is also the only station on the original Green Line not located under De Maisonneuve Boulevard.

Designed by Robillard, Jetté et Beaudoin, it is a normal side platform station built in tunnel. A transept provides access via several long escalators to the entrance, which was recently rebuilt according to a design by Christian Bisson.

Renovations occurred in November–December 2005, when the station was closed during weekends.

== Origin of the name ==
Frontenac station takes its name from nearby Rue Frontenac, which in turn is named for Louis de Buade, sieur de Frontenac et de Palluau. The godson of King Louis XIII, he was governor-general of New France between 1672 and his death in 1698. Frontenac is famous for repelling the attack of Sir William Phips, saying, "I will not respond to your general but through the mouths of my cannons and with gunfire."

== Connecting bus routes ==
Société de transport de Montréal
No.	Route	Connects to	Service times / notes
85	Hochelaga	Honoré-Beaugrand; Pie-IX BRT; Joliette; Préfontaine	Daily
94	D'Iberville	D'Iberville	Daily
125	Ontario	McGill; Place-des-Arts; Viau	Daily
185	Sherbrooke	Honoré-Beaugrand; Radisson; Langelier; Cadillac	Daily
350 ☾	Verdun / LaSalle	Bonaventure; Gare Centrale; Terminus Centre-ville; Lucien-L'Allier; Atwater; Lionel-Groulx; LaSalle; De L'Église; Verdun; Jolicoeur; Monk	Night service
353 ☾	Lacordaire / Maurice-Duplessis	Viau	Night service
355 ☾	Pie-IX	Saint-Michel-Montréal-Nord; Pie-IX; Bonaventure; Gare Centrale; Terminus Centre-ville; Lucien-L'Allier; Atwater	Night service
356 ☾	Lachine / YUL Aéroport / Des Sources	Atwater; Montréal-Ouest; Du Canal; Dorval; Des Sources; Sunnybrooke; Pierrefonds-Roxboro	Night service Connects to Montréal-Trudeau International Airport
357 ☾	Saint-Michel	Saint-Michel	Night service
358 ☾	René-Lévesque	Papineau; Bonaventure; Gare Centrale; Terminus Centre-ville; Lucien-L'Allier; Atwater	Night service
360 ☾	Des Pins	Sherbrooke; Atwater	Night service
362 ☾	Hochelaga / Notre-Dame	Honoré-Beaugrand; Joliette; Préfontaine	Night service
364 ☾	Sherbrooke / Joseph-Renaud	Honoré-Beaugrand; Radisson; Langelier; Cadillac; Bonaventure; Gare Centrale; Terminus Centre-ville; Lucien-L'Allier; Atwater	Night service
368 ☾	Avenue-Du-Mont-Royal	Édouard-Montpetit; Université-de-Montréal; Côte-Sainte-Catherine; Plamondon; Namur; De La Savane; Côte-Vertu	Night service

== Nearby points of interest ==
- Place Frontenac
- Maison de la culture et bibliothèque Frontenac
- Éco-quartier de Sainte-Marie
- Parc Médéric-Martin
- Centre Jean-Claude Malépart
- Bain Mathieu - Société pour promouvoir les arts gigantesques (SPAG)
- Maison Norman Bethune
