= Verdun station =

Montreal Metro station

Verdun
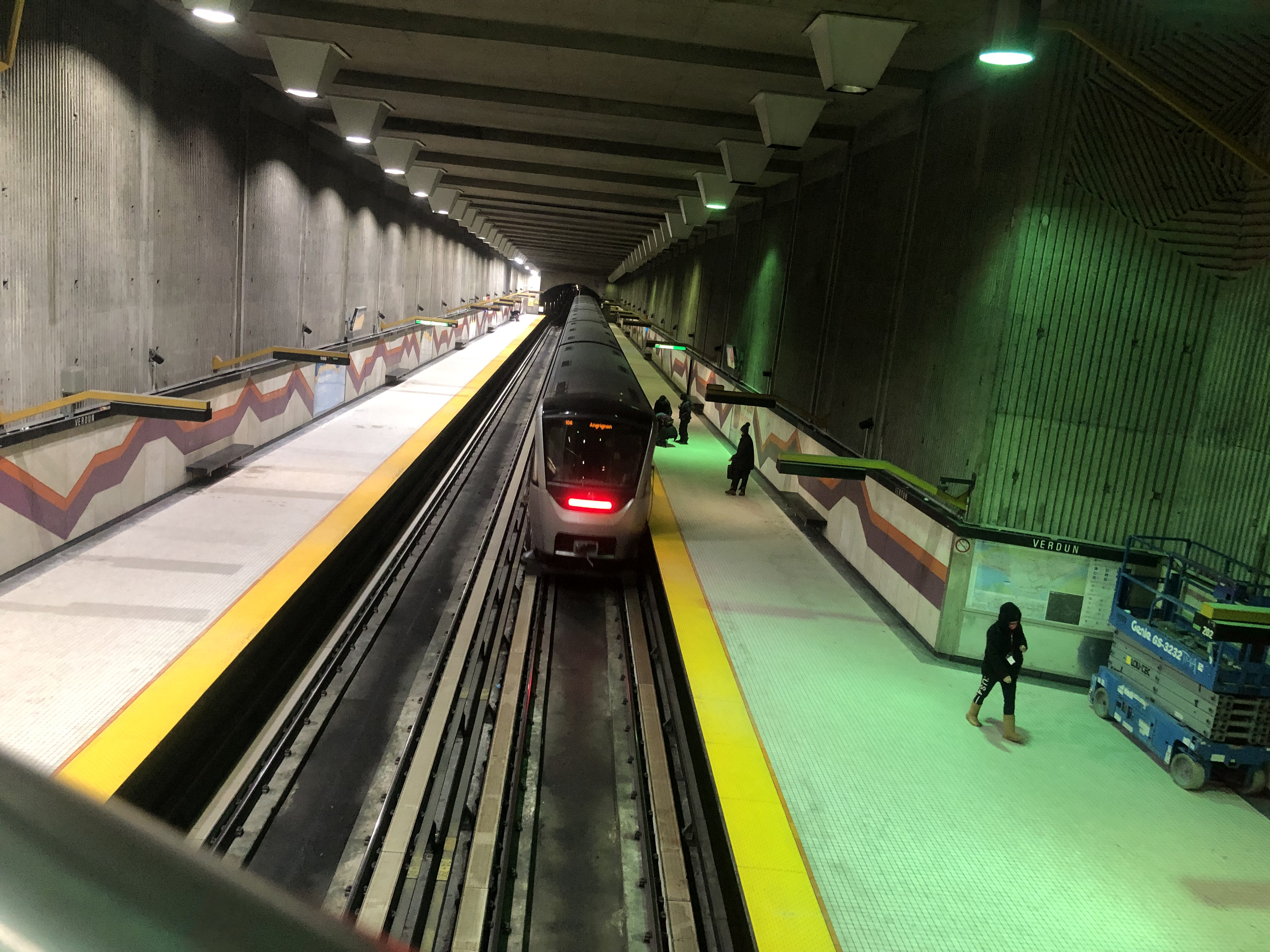
- The station's platform, with a train leaving toward Angrignon

General information
- Location: 4520/4525, rue de Verdun; Verdun, Quebec H4G 1M3; Canada
- Coordinates: 45°27′34″N 73°34′18″W
- Operator: Société de transport de Montréal
- Platforms: 2 side platforms
- Tracks: 2
- Connections: STM bus

Construction
- Depth: 21.9 metres (71 feet 10 inches), 12th deepest
- Accessible: No
- Architect: Jean-Maurice Dubé

Other information
- Fare zone: ARTM: A

History
- Opened: 3 September 1978

Passengers
- 2024: 1,542,247 ▲7.92%
- Rank: 56 of 68

Services
Preceding station	Montreal Metro	Following station
Jolicoeur toward Angrignon	Green Line	De l'Église toward Honoré-Beaugrand
Location

Verdun station (French pronunciation: [vɛʁdœ̃]) is a Montreal Metro station in the borough of Verdun in Montreal, Quebec, Canada. It is operated by the Société de transport de Montréal (STM) and serves the Green Line. It opened on September 3, 1978, as part of the extension of the Green Line westward to Angrignon station.

== Architecture and art ==
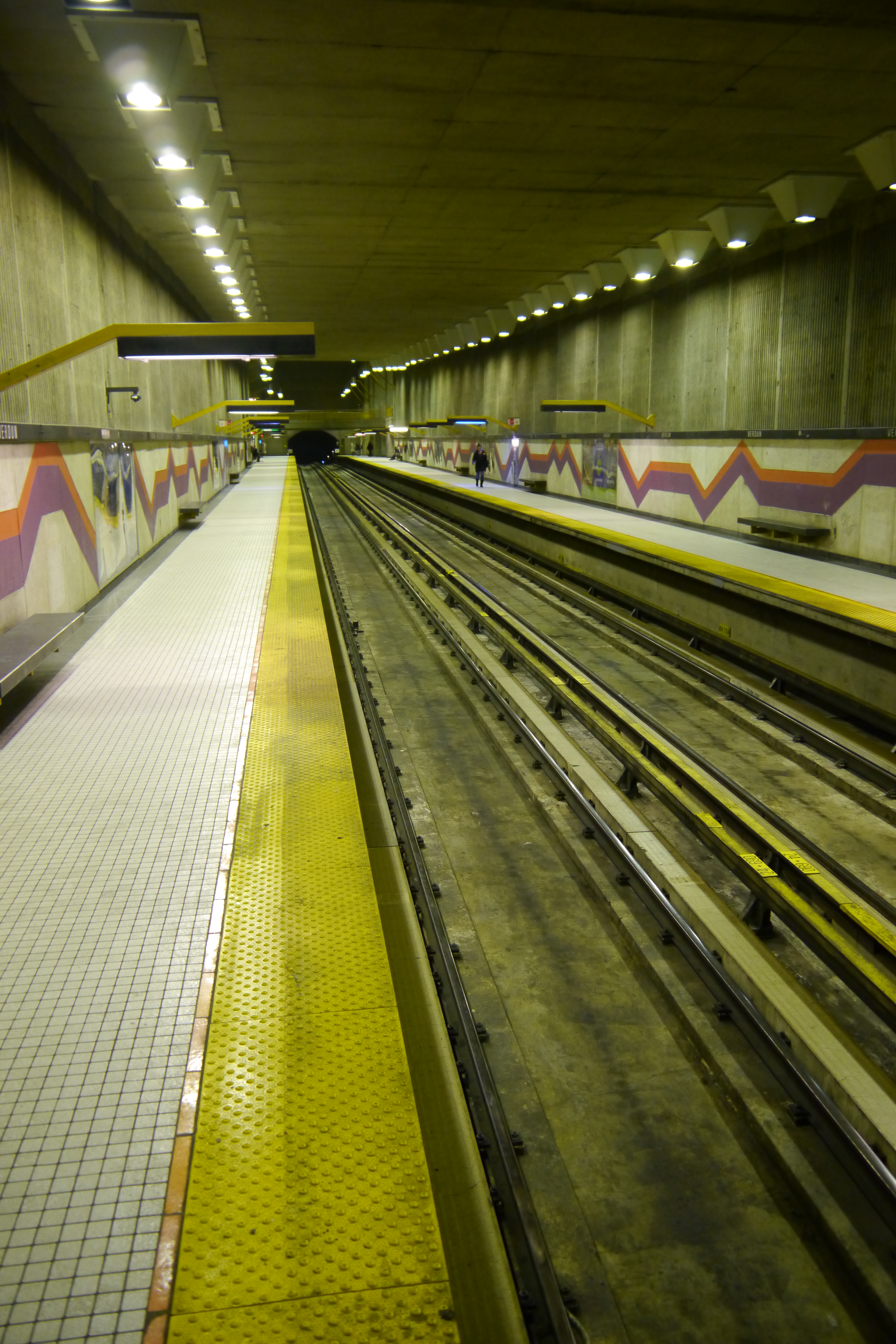
The forced perspective construction can be seen with the lowering ceiling.

Designed by Jean-Maurice Dubé, it is a normal side platform station, built in a deep open cut necessitated by the surrounding Utica shale formation. The ticket hall is located at transept level, and both the mezzanine and platforms are surmounted by high volumes. The volume over the tracks and platforms has a forced perspective; the ceiling lowers and the platform width shortens on the western end of the station. Accesses are located on either side of rue de Verdun.

The artwork running throughout the station consists of concrete walls with bas-reliefs in the upper parts and painted motifs on the lower, which were designed by Claude Théberge and Antoine D. Lamarche.

== Origin of the name ==
This station is named for rue de Verdun and for the borough (formerly the city) of Verdun, in front of whose borough office the station is located. The land that would later constitute the borough was granted as a concession to Zacharie Dupuis in 1671; he named it Fief-de-Verdun for his birthplace at Saverdun in the south of France.

== Connecting bus routes ==
Société de transport de Montréal
No.	Route	Connects to	Service times / notes
107	Verdun	LaSalle; Square-Victoria-OACI	Daily
350 ☾	Verdun / LaSalle	Frontenac; Bonaventure; Gare Centrale; Terminus Centre-ville; Lucien-L'Allier; Atwater; Lionel-Groulx; LaSalle; De L'Église; Jolicoeur; Monk	Night service

== Nearby points of interest ==
- Verdun borough office
- Régie du logement
- Centre communautaire Marcel-Giroux
- St. Willibrord Hospitality Centre
