= Monk station =

Montreal Metro station

Monk
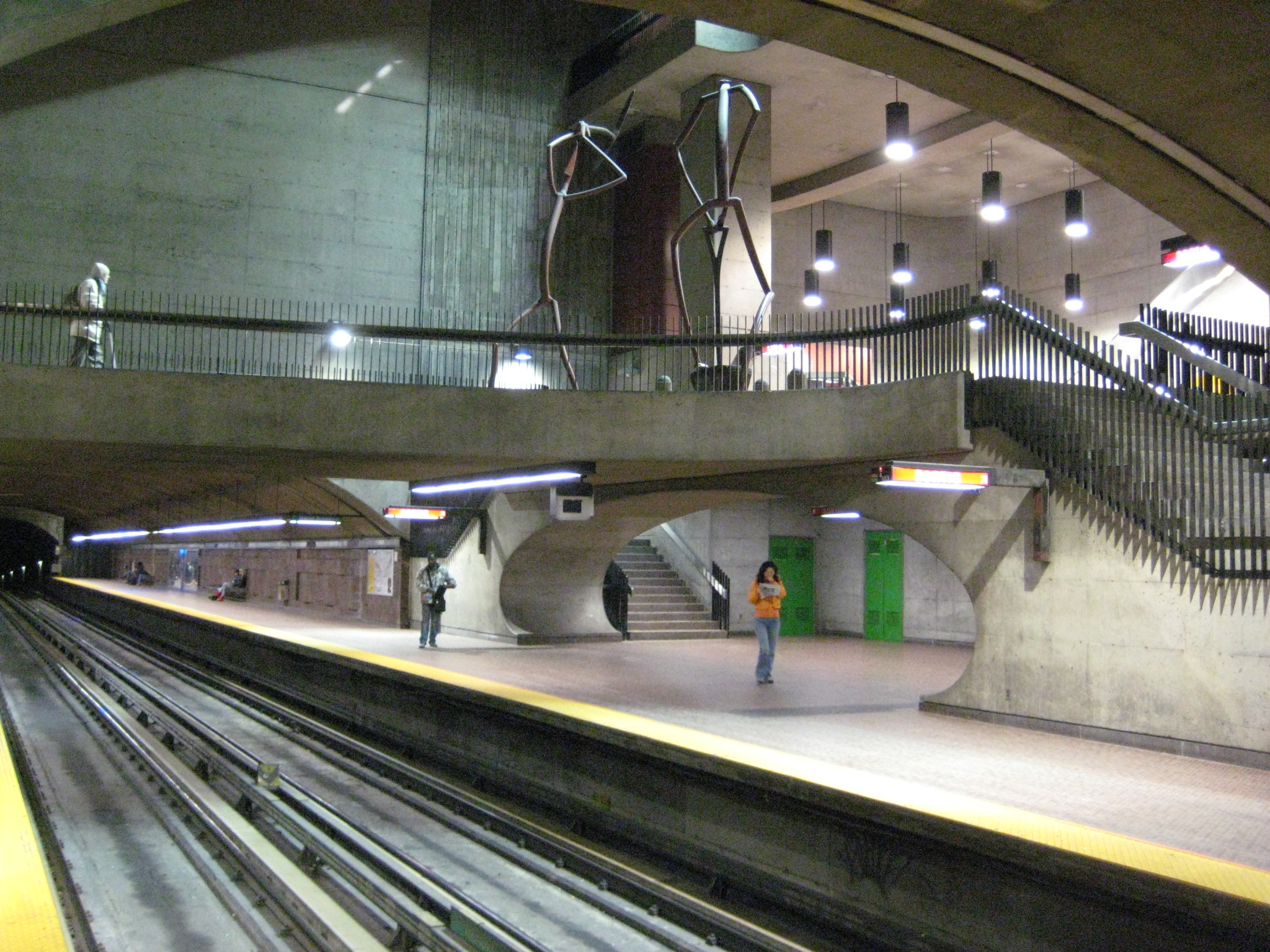

General information
- Location: 6750 and 6805 Monk Boulevard; Montreal, Quebec H4E 2K9; Canada
- Coordinates: 45°27′05″N 73°35′35″W
- Operator: Société de transport de Montréal
- Platforms: 2 side platforms
- Tracks: 2
- Connections: STM bus

Construction
- Depth: 18.3 metres (60 feet), 18th deepest
- Accessible: Yes
- Architect: Blais & Bélanger

Other information
- Fare zone: ARTM: A

History
- Opened: 3 September 1978

Passengers
- 2024: 1,398,979 ▲6.23%
- Rank: 60 of 68

Services
Preceding station	Montreal Metro	Following station
Angrignon Terminus	Green Line	Jolicoeur toward Honoré-Beaugrand
Location

Monk station is a Montreal Metro station in the borough of Le Sud-Ouest in Montreal, Quebec, Canada. It is operated by the Société de transport de Montréal (STM) and serves Green Line. The station is located in the Ville-Émard district.

== Art and architecture ==
The station structure was designed by Blais & Bélanger and features many works of art, including the large sculpture Pic et Pelle by artist Germain Bergeron. Monk also features many balconies that overlook the main station below, however they have been closed for the safety of the visually impaired.

Germain Bergeron considered many different ideas for the public art for this station. His first concept was to create a series of flying saucers that were suspended from the roof of the station, and were to move with the wind generated by passing trains. However, this was deemed too dangerous by authorities, and the idea was cancelled.

The current two giant statues of workers constructing the Metro were to have been accompanied by a third, representing a foreman, but this idea was judged superfluous and scrapped.

== Origin of the name ==
The station is named for boulevard Monk, itself named to honour the Monk family. It is unclear which member is being honoured. It could be Sir James Monk (1745–1826), a prosecutor who served on Quebec's vice admiralty court from 1778 to 1788 and subsequently became Montreal's chief justice from 1793 to 1820. Alternatively, the boulevard and the station could be named for Frederick D. Monk, an attorney who, along with Joseph-Ulric Émard, purchased land belonging to the Davidson family in order to develop it; the area became Ville-Émard.

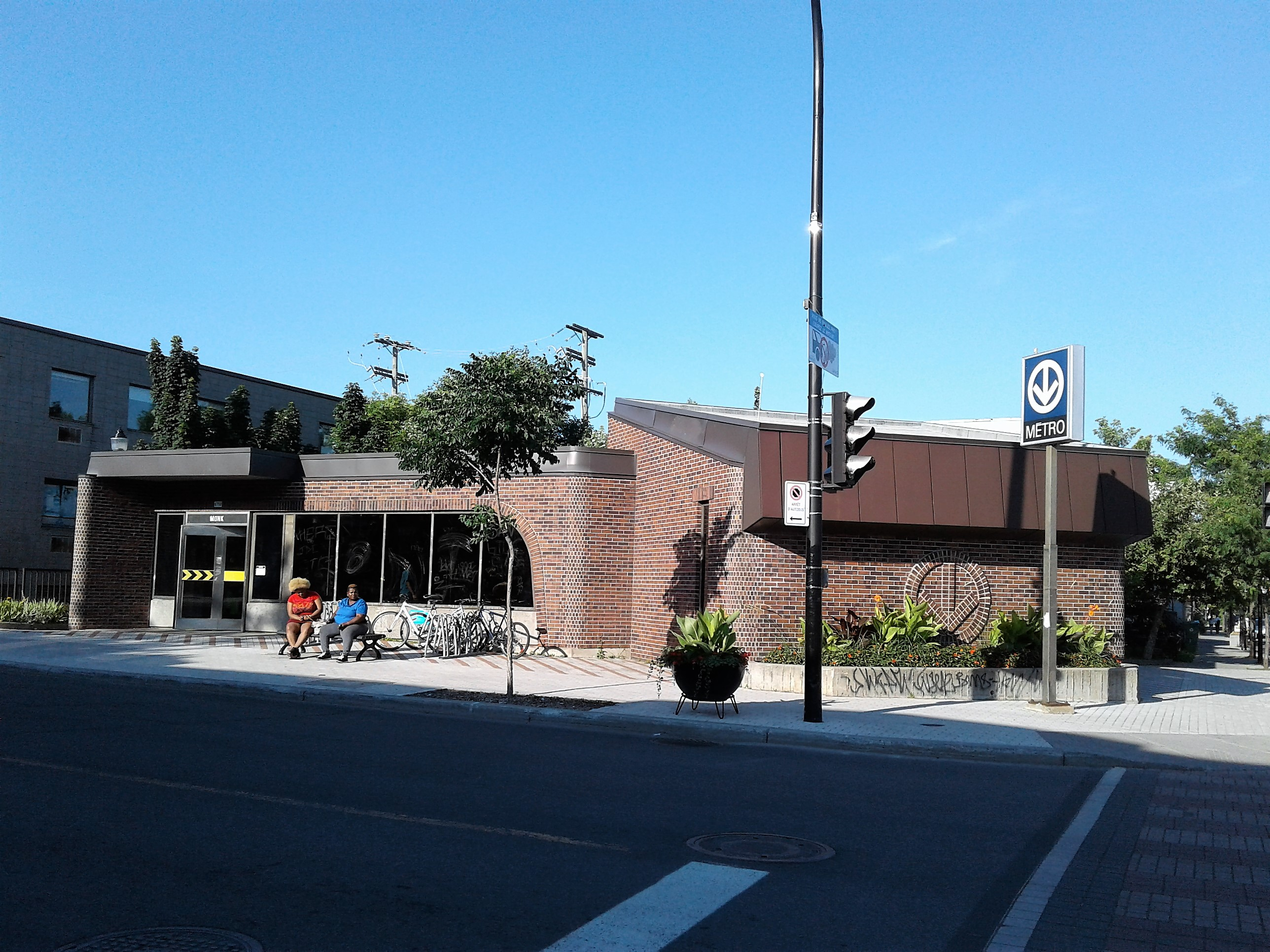
Entrance

== Connecting bus routes ==
Société de transport de Montréal
No.	Route	Connects to	Services times / notes
35	Griffintown	Angrignon; Place-Saint-Henri; Square-Victoria-OACI; McGill	Daily
36	Monk	Angrignon; Place-Saint-Henri; Square-Victoria-OACI	Daily
350 ☾	Verdun / LaSalle	Frontenac; Bonaventure; Gare Centrale; Terminus Centre-ville; Lucien-L'Allier; Atwater; Lionel-Groulx; LaSalle; De L'Église; Verdun; Jolicoeur	Night service

== Nearby points of interest ==
- Beurling Academy
- Centre hospitalier Ville Émard
- Douglas Hospital
- École Dollard-des-Ormeaux
- École St-Jean-de-Matha
- École Honoré-Mercier
