= LaSalle station (Montreal Metro) =

Montreal Metro station

LaSalle
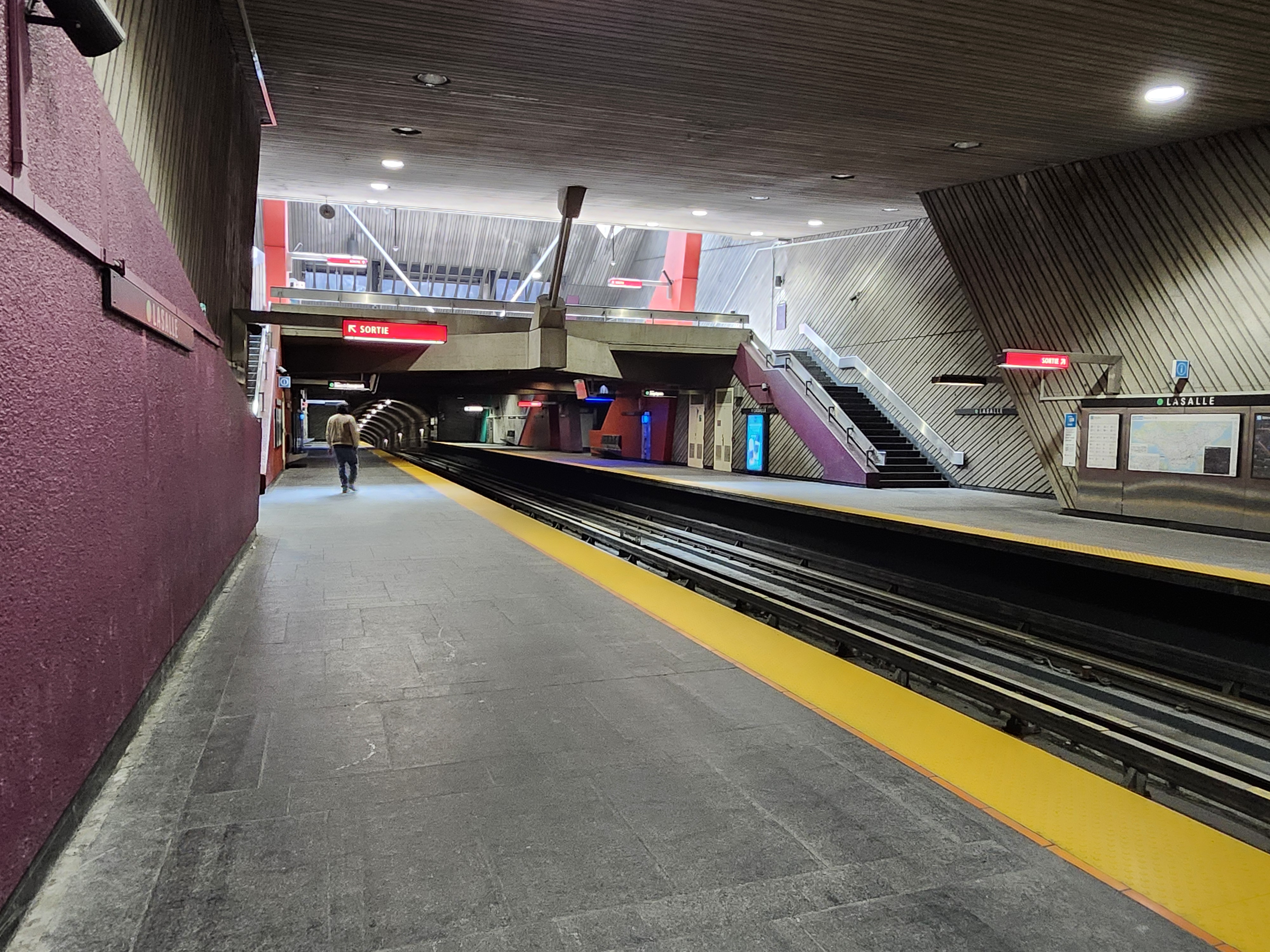

General information
- Location: 301, av. Caisse; Verdun, Quebec H4G 3M3; Canada
- Coordinates: 45°28′15″N 73°33′59″W
- Operator: Société de transport de Montréal
- Platforms: 2 side platforms
- Tracks: 2
- Connections: STM bus

Construction
- Depth: 9.8 metres (32 feet 2 inches), 53rd deepest
- Accessible: No
- Architect: Didier, Gillon et Larouche

Other information
- Fare zone: ARTM: A

History
- Opened: 3 September 1978

Passengers
- 2024: 1,269,359 ▲4.9%
- Rank: 66 of 68

Services
Preceding station	Montreal Metro	Following station
De l'Église toward Angrignon	Green Line	Charlevoix toward Honoré-Beaugrand
Location

LaSalle station (French pronunciation: [lasal]) is a Montreal Metro station in the borough of Verdun, in Montreal, Quebec, Canada. It is operated by the Société de transport de Montréal (STM) and serves the Green Line. The station opened on September 3, 1978, as part of the extension of the Green Line westward to Angrignon station.

== Architecture and art ==
Designed by Didier, Gillon et Larouche, it is a normal side platform station with one ticket hall and access. The platform and mezzanine walls are enlivened by large, irregular concrete planes painted in bright colours, designed by Michèle Tremblay-Gillon, while a stainless-steel mural by Peter Gnass above the ticket hall reflects sunlight and passengers' movements.

== Origin of the name ==
This station is named for nearby LaSalle Boulevard, named for explorer Robert Cavelier de La Salle (1643–1687), who founded the town of Lachine and claimed Louisiana for France.

Since the station is not located in the neighbouring borough of LaSalle, alternative names have been proposed, including Paul-Grégoire and Curé-Caisse; the latter name was approved by the Montreal Urban Community in 1984, but for unknown reasons the name change was not carried out.

== Connecting bus routes ==
Société de transport de Montréal
No.	Route	Connects to	Service times / notes
37	Jolicoeur	Angrignon; Jolicoeur	Daily
61	Wellington	De L'Église; Charlevoix; Bonaventure	Daily Some rush hour services start and end at Charlevoix metro
107	Verdun	Verdun; Square-Victoria-OACI	Daily
108	Bannantyne	Atwater; Lionel-Groulx	Daily
350 ☾	Verdun / LaSalle	Frontenac; Bonaventure; Gare Centrale; Terminus Centre-ville; Lucien-L'Allier; Atwater; Lionel-Groulx; De L'Église; Verdun; Jolicoeur; Monk	Night service

== Nearby points of interest ==
- Champlain Bridge
- Maison Saint-Gabriel
- Île des Soeurs
