= Lionel-Groulx station =

Montreal Metro station

Lionel-Groulx
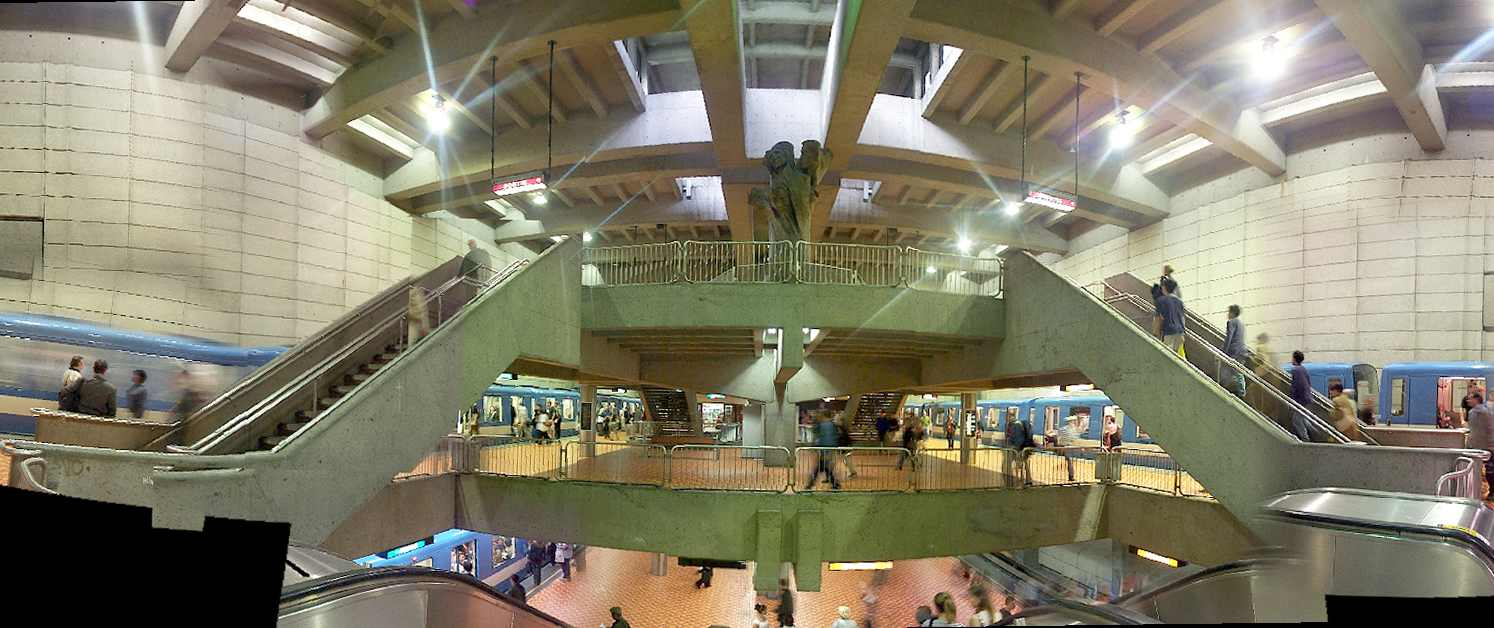

General information
- Location: 620, Atwater Avenue; Montreal, Quebec H4C 2G6; Canada
- Coordinates: 45°28′58″N 73°34′47″W
- Operator: Société de transport de Montréal
- Lines: Green Line; Orange Line
- Platforms: 2 island platforms (1 on each level)
- Tracks: 4 (2 on each level)
- Connections: STM bus

Construction
- Depth: 12.5 metres (41 feet) (upper platform); 16.5 metres (54 feet) (lower platform), 29th deepest
- Accessible: Yes
- Architect: Yves Roy

Other information
- Fare zone: ARTM: A

History
- Opened: 3 September 1978 (Green line); 28 April 1980 (Orange Line)

Passengers
- 2024: 5,139,683 (excluding transfers) ▲11.49%
- Rank: 11 of 68

Services
Preceding station	Montreal Metro	Following station
Charlevoix toward Angrignon	Green Line	Atwater toward Honoré-Beaugrand
Place-Saint-Henri toward Côte-Vertu	Orange Line	Georges-Vanier toward Montmorency
Location

Lionel-Groulx is a Montreal Metro station in the borough of Le Sud-Ouest in Montreal, Quebec, Canada. It is operated by the Société de transport de Montréal (STM) and is a transfer station between the Green Line and Orange Line, with cross-platform interchange available. It is located in the Saint-Henri area, along Atwater Avenue on that area's eastern border with Little Burgundy. If transfers between lines are included, the station is one of the busiest on the Metro. It first opened in 1978.

== History ==
The station opened on September 3, 1978 as part of the extension of the Green Line to Angrignon, but service was on the Green Line only. Though the Orange Line platforms were built at the same time, they did not enter service until the extension to Place-Saint-Henri was opened on April 28, 1980. The station was the first transfer station after Berri–UQAM opened in the original network.

In 2009, it became the first existing station, after elevators were added, to be retrofitted to be fully wheelchair-accessible. Berri-UQAM station had elevators added at the same time but only between the mezzanine and the Orange Line platforms. (The three stations in Laval, which opened in 2007, already had elevators.) Three elevators connect, respectively, the entrance to the mezzanine, the mezzanine to the upper platform, and the upper platform to the lower platform.

== Architecture and art ==
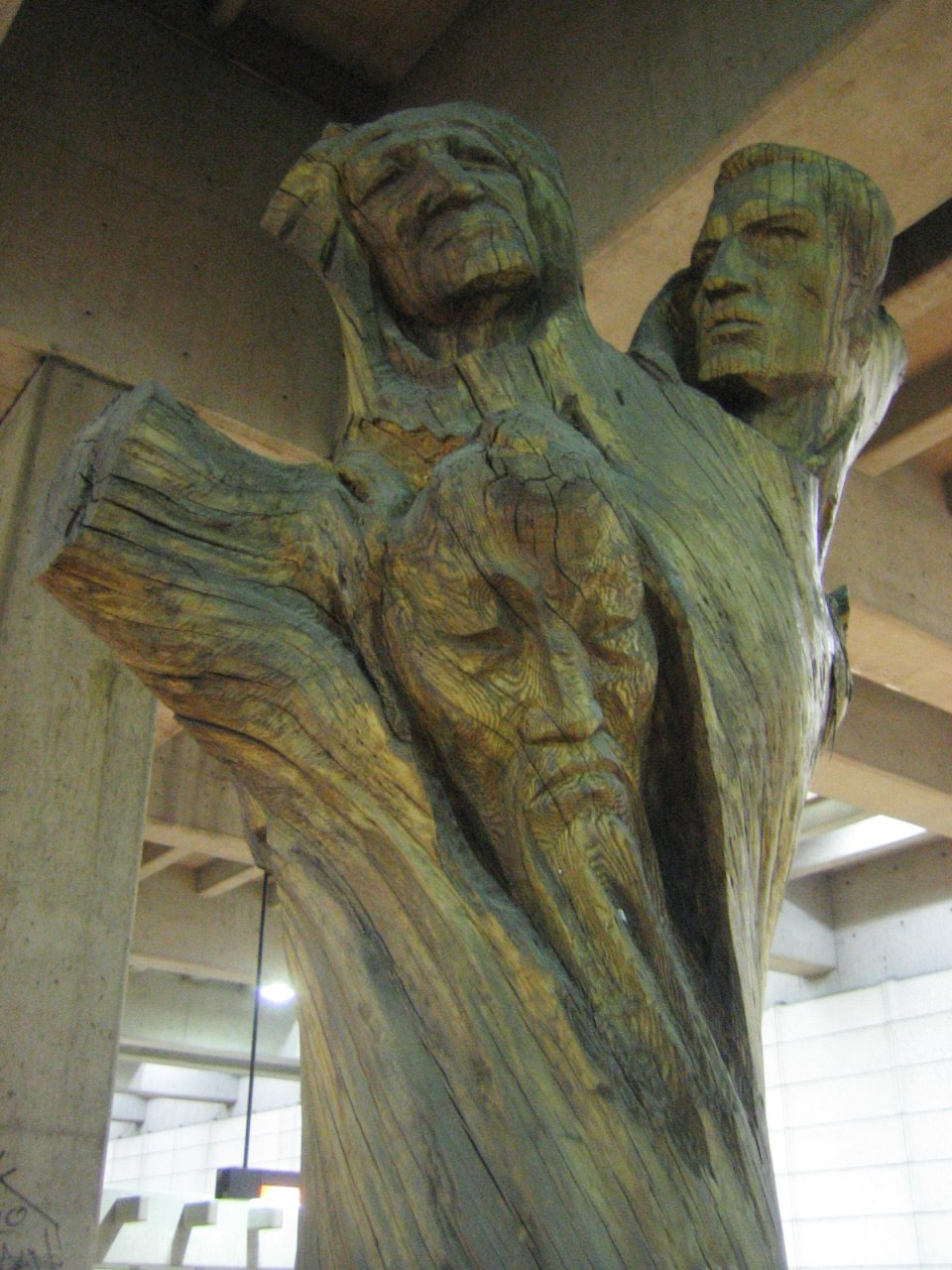
The Tree of Life by Joseph Rifesser stands in the Lionel-Groulx Metro Station

Arrangement of the platforms at Lionel-Groulx Metro Station

The station, built in open cut, features stacked platforms with central platforms between the lines; the Orange Line is to the south and the Green Line to the north. The platforms are arranged in an anti-directional cross-platform interchange, with the two inbound lines (Montmorency and Honoré-Beaugrand) on the upper level, and the two outbound lines (Côte-Vertu and Angrignon) on the lower level. This allows the majority of passengers to transfer by simply walking across the platform, without having to go up or down stairs. The station's mezzanine, suspended on beams, is located above the upper platform, and gives access to the single entrance. The orange, yellow and red circular tiles on the platform floor recall the multi-colored maple leaves that typically carpet the city’s sidewalks, parks and surrounding woodlands in autumn.

The station was designed by Yves Roy. It contains two artworks: a pair of stainless steel mural sculptures by the architect over the mezzanine, and in the mezzanine itself, a sculpture called The Tree of Life by Italian artist Joseph Rifesser. Representing the races of humanity growing from a common root, it was carved from the entire trunk of a walnut tree, it was originally located at Man and His World and was given to the Metro by the United Nations.

The station is equipped with the MétroVision information screens which displays news, commercials, and the time till the next train.

== Station layout ==
G	Street Level	Exit / Entrance
B1	Mezzanine	Fare control, station agent
B2	Outer loop	← Orange Line toward Montmorency via Henri-Bourassa (Georges-Vanier)
B2	Island platform, doors will open on the left
B2	Northbound	→ Green Line toward Honoré-Beaugrand (Atwater) →
B3	Inner loop	→ Orange Line toward Côte-Vertu (Place-Saint-Henri) →
B3	Island platform, doors will open on the right
B3	Southbound	← Green Line toward Angrignon (Charlevoix)

== Origin of the name ==
This station is named for rue Lionel-Groulx, which had its name changed to allow the station to commemorate Lionel Groulx. Groulx, one of the most influential of Quebec historians, founded the Franco-American History Institute in 1946 and edited the Revue d'histoire de l'Amérique française from 1947 to 1967.

In November 1996, the League for Human Rights of B'nai Brith Canada officially requested that the Executive Committee of the Montreal Urban Community (M.U.C.) recommend a name change to the station, due to anti-Semitic statements and positions made and maintained by Lionel Groulx.

Likewise, there has been a recent movement to rename the station in honour of Oscar Peterson. The movement was originally started as a virtual petition, but has recently been picked up by the media. The issue was politicized and fraught in controversy as global monuments and statues celebrating controversial historical icons were called in to question.

== Connecting bus routes ==
Société de transport de Montréal
No.	Route	Connects to	Service times / notes
101	Saint-Patrick	Angrignon; Terminus Lafleur / Newman; LaSalle	Weekdays only
108	Bannantyne	LaSalle; Atwater	Daily
190	Norman	Place-Saint-Henri	Weekdays only
211	Bord-du-Lac	Kirkland; Beaconsfield; Pine Beach; Pointe-Claire; Dorval	Daily
350 ☾	Verdun / LaSalle	Frontenac; Bonaventure; Gare Centrale; Terminus Centre-ville; Lucien-L'Allier; Atwater; LaSalle; De L'Église; Verdun; Jolicoeur; Monk	Night service
411	Express Lionel-Groulx	Pointe-Claire; Pine Beach; Dorval	Daily
491	Express Provost		Weekdays only
496	Express Victoria	Dorval	Daily
747 ✈	YUL Airport / Downtown	Gare d'autocars de Montréal; Berri-UQAM; Bonaventure; Gare Centrale; Terminus Centre-ville; Lucien-L'Allier	Daily Some runs start or end at this station

== Nearby points of interest ==
- Atwater Market
- Église Saint-Irénée
- Union United Church
- Parc du Canal de Lachine
- CÉDA (Comité d'éducation aux adultes)
- Solin Hall (Off-Campus Residence of McGill University)

== Film and television appearances ==
- Scenes of the Bruce Willis-Richard Gere film The Jackal were shot in this station, redressed to stand in for the Metro Center station on the Washington Metro.
- Scenes from the Marvel Comics film Punisher: War Zone were also shot in this station, as the entrance to the Punisher's lair.
- Scenes from the movie Catch Me If You Can starring Leonardo DiCaprio and Tom Hanks were also shot in this station.
- The station entrance appears in many Just for Laughs: Gags pranks.
