= Église Notre-Dame-des-Sept-Douleurs de Montréal =

Church in Montreal, Quebec, Canada

Coordinates: 45.4626°N 73.5676°W

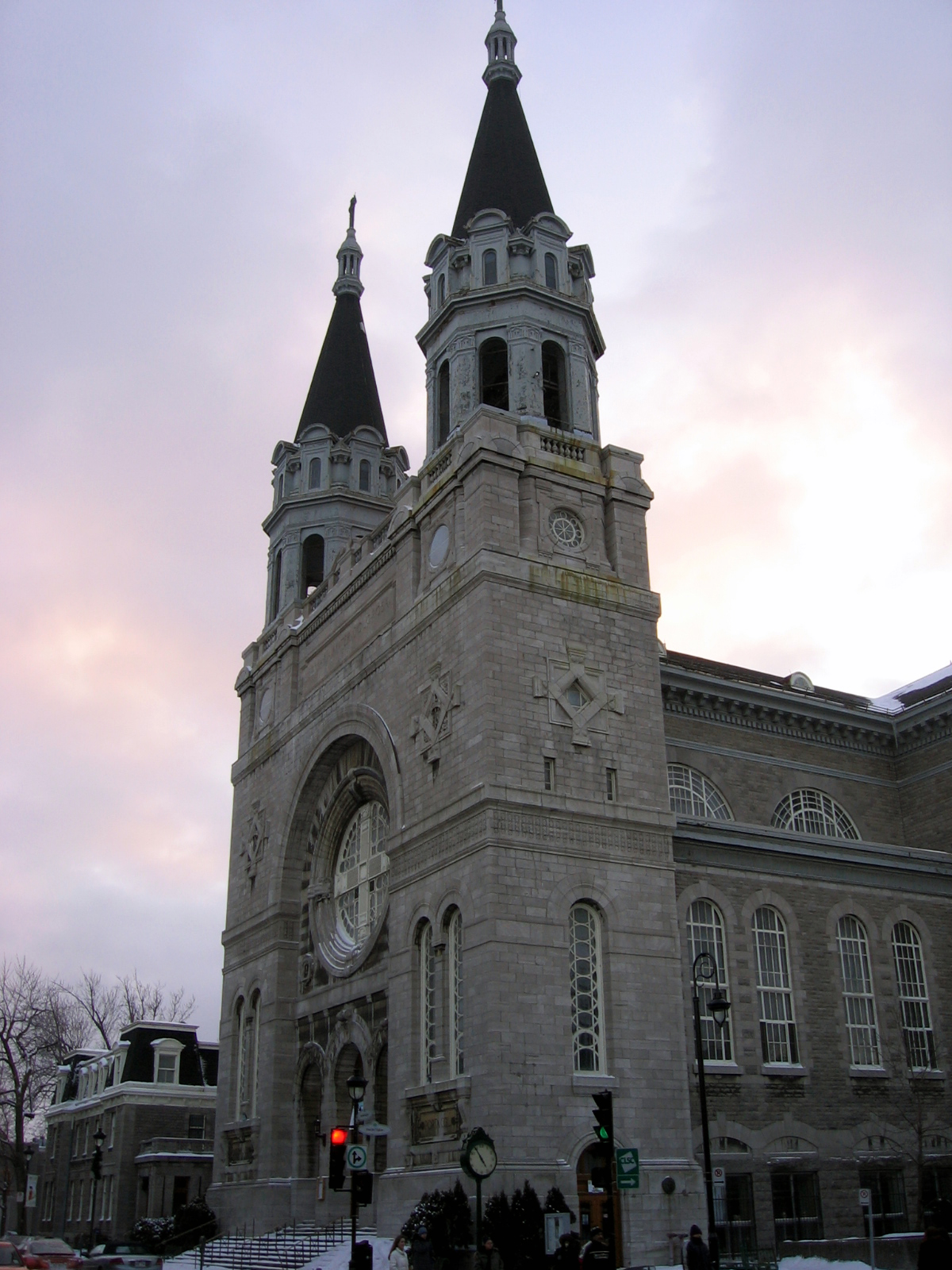
Église Notre-Dame-des-Sept-Douleurs de Montréal

The Église Notre-Dame-des-Sept-Douleurs de Montréal (En:Church of Our Lady of the Seven Sorrows of Montreal) is a Roman Catholic church in Verdun, Montreal, Quebec. It is located on Wellington Street. The De l'Église metro station is named for the church. It was designed by Montreal architect Joseph Venne and completed in 1911.

== See also ==
- Our Lady of Sorrows
