= Square-Victoria–OACI station =

Montreal Metro station

Square-Victoria–OACI
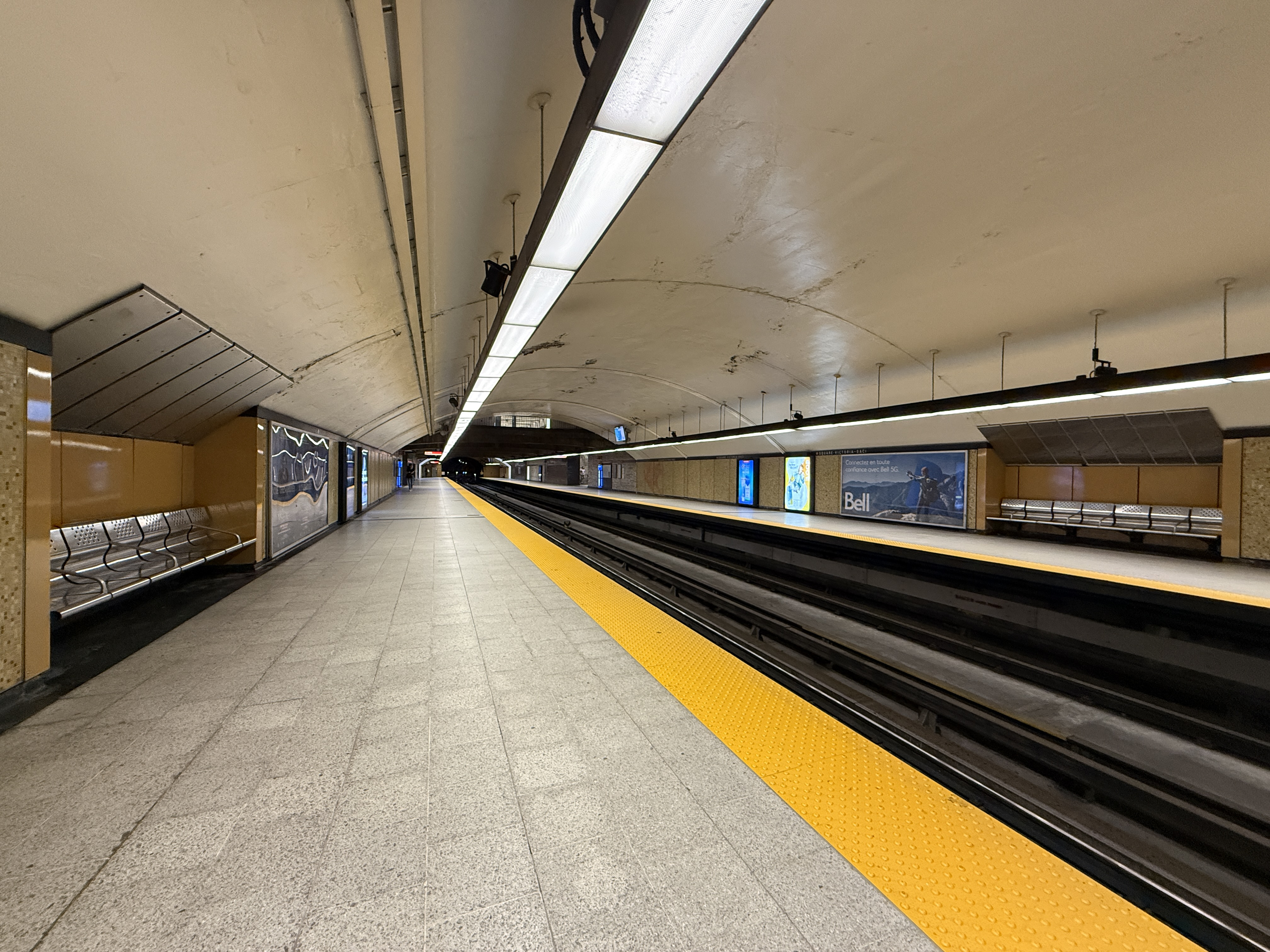
- Square-Victoria–OACI station platform in 2026

General information
- Location: Square Victoria; Montreal, Quebec H3C 1E8; Canada
- Coordinates: 45°30′07″N 73°33′47″W
- Operator: Société de transport de Montréal
- Platforms: 2 side platforms
- Tracks: 2
- Connections: STM bus

Construction
- Depth: 16.2 metres (53 feet 2 inches), 31st deepest
- Accessible: No
- Architect: Irving Sager

Other information
- Fare zone: ARTM: A

History
- Opened: 6 February 1967
- Former names: Square-Victoria (1967–2014)

Passengers
- 2024: 4,449,451 ▲45.2%
- Rank: 20 of 68

Services
Preceding station	Montreal Metro	Following station
Bonaventure toward Côte-Vertu	Orange Line	Place-d'Armes toward Montmorency
Location

Square-Victoria–OACI station is a Montreal Metro station in the borough of Ville-Marie in Montreal, Quebec, Canada. It is operated by the Société de transport de Montréal (STM) and serves the Orange Line. It is located in Victoria Square near the Quartier international de Montréal district. The station opened on February 6, 1967, four months after most of the initial network, and was briefly the terminus of the Orange Line until Bonaventure station was opened a week later.

== Overview ==
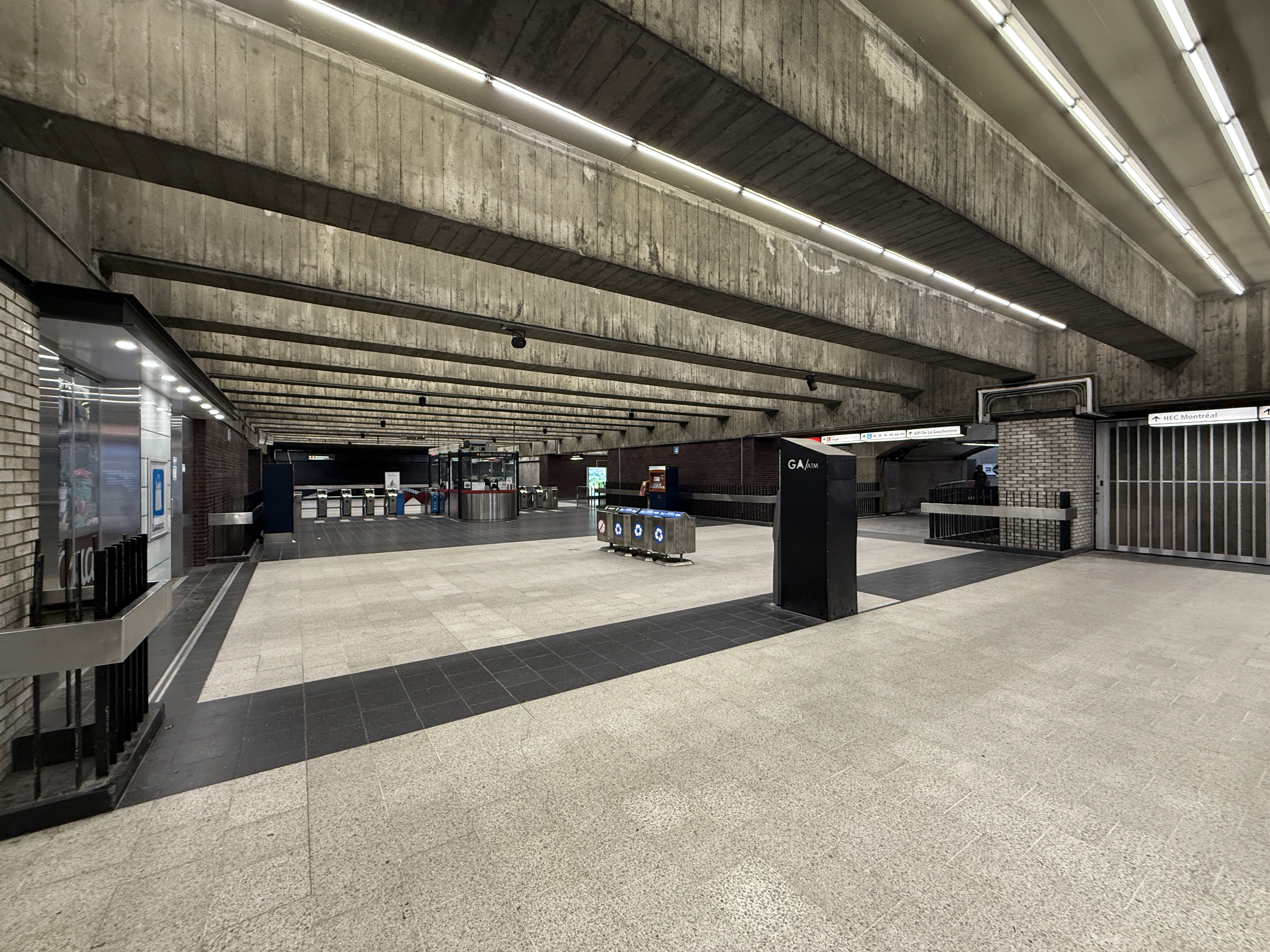
Concourse

The station is a normal side platform station; its central mezzanine is connected to a very long tunnel running along Beaver Hall Hill and under Victoria Square, giving access to its various exits.

Each of the station's exits is connected to another building or buildings via the underground city. The Belmont exit is connected to and located in the 1080 Beaver Hall Hill building; the Viger exit is likewise connected to and located in the Bell Tower/National Bank complex. The Saint Antoine exit is a link in the main part of the underground city, linking the OACI building (from french acronym for Organisation de l'aviation civile internationale) with the Centre CDP Capital, while the rotunda at the south end of the tunnel, leading to the Saint Jacques exit, links the Tour de la Bourse with the Centre de commerce mondial.

The station was designed by Irving Sager. Two steel murals by Robert Savoie, entitled Kawari Kabuto, grace the walls of the great volume over the tunnel vaults, and a mural in the pedestrian tunnel to the northern entrances is by Jean-Paul Mousseau. The southern rotunda formerly contained a multimedia installation entitled Ars Natura, promoting Montreal's science museums.

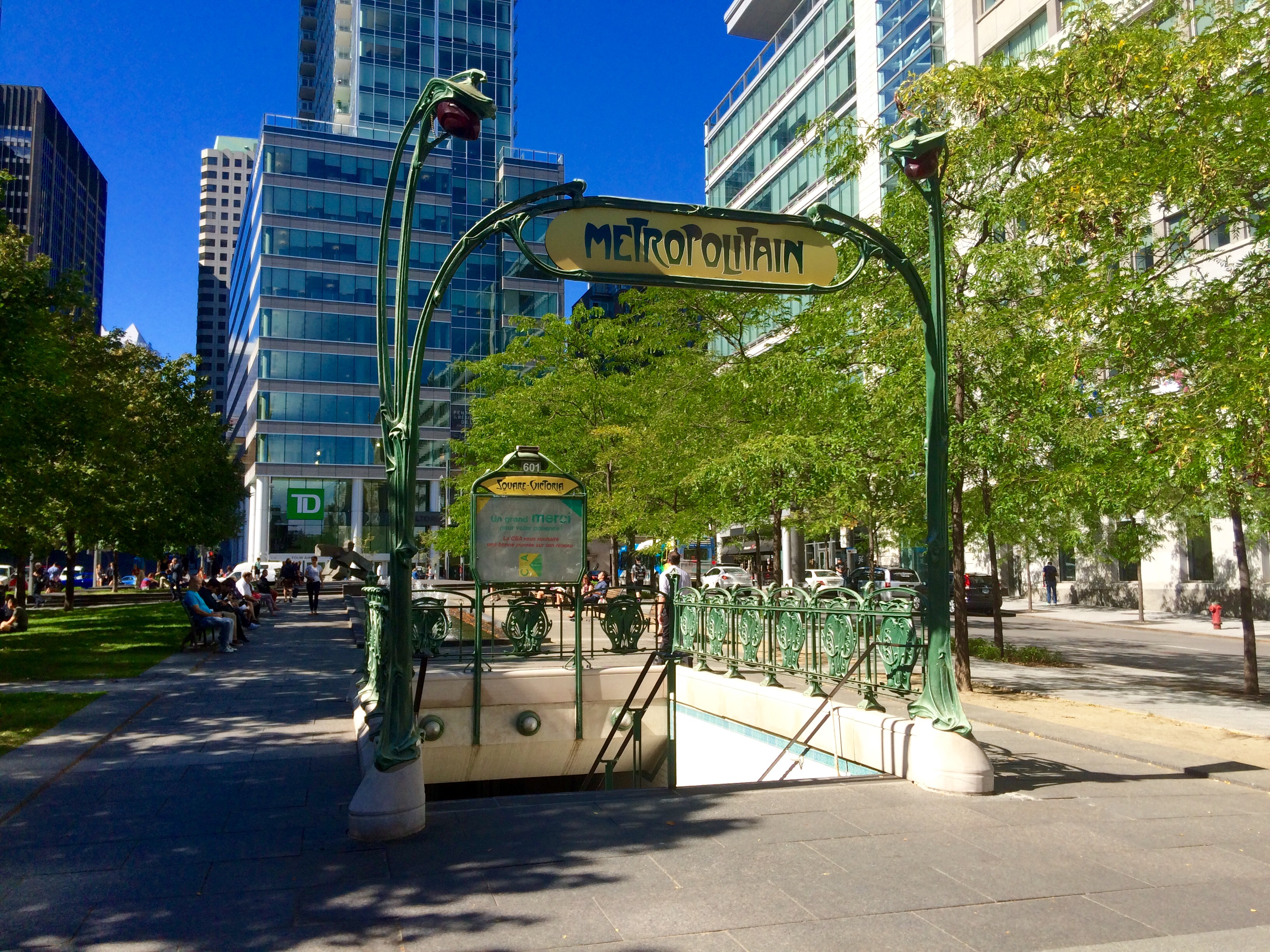
Hector Guimard's entrance portico

The most famous artwork, however, is one of Hector Guimard's Art Nouveau entrance porticos from the Paris Métro. One of the few authentic installations on a rapid transit station outside Paris, it was given in 1967 by the RATP (Régie autonome des transports parisiens) to commemorate the collaboration of French and Canadian engineers in building the Metro. It is located within Victoria Square on the Saint Antoine entrance, one of only four open-air entrances on the network (the others are located at Place-Saint-Henri and Bonaventure stations). In 2003, the entrance was removed, completely restored, and reinstalled.

The station is equipped with the MétroVision information screens which displays news, commercials, and the time till the next train.

The station has 4 entrances:

605, Belmont Street (Montreal) (Closed indefinitely)
601, Viger Avenue
601 Saint Antoine Street W
605, Saint Jacques Street W

Since April 2026, the Belmont exit was closed indefinitely citing security concerns.

== Origin of the name ==
This station is named for Victoria Square, which has existed since 1813; it was renamed for Queen Victoria on the occasion of the visit of the Prince of Wales (later King Edward VII) to Montreal in 1860.

Until the spring of 2014, the station was named Square-Victoria. In June 2014, the station was renamed Square-Victoria–OACI, referring to the nearby headquarters of the International Civil Aviation Organization (French: Organisation de l'aviation civile internationale, OACI). This was done to celebrate the 70th anniversary of ICAO's presence in Montreal.

== Connecting bus routes ==
Société de transport de Montréal
No.	Route	Connects to	Service times / notes
35	Griffintown	Angrignon; Monk; Place-Saint-Henri; McGill	Daily
36	Monk	Angrignon; Monk; Place-Saint-Henri	Daily
50	Vieux-Montréal / Vieux-Port	Gare d'autocars de Montréal; Berri-UQAM; Peel	Daily
107	Verdun	Verdun; LaSalle	Daily
168	Cité-du-Havre	Île-des-Soeurs; McGill	Daily
872	Île-des-Soeurs Shuttle	McGill; Île-des-Soeurs	Weekdays, peak only Created to act as a temporary measure until the opening of the entire REM network

== Nearby points of interest ==
=== Connected via the underground city ===
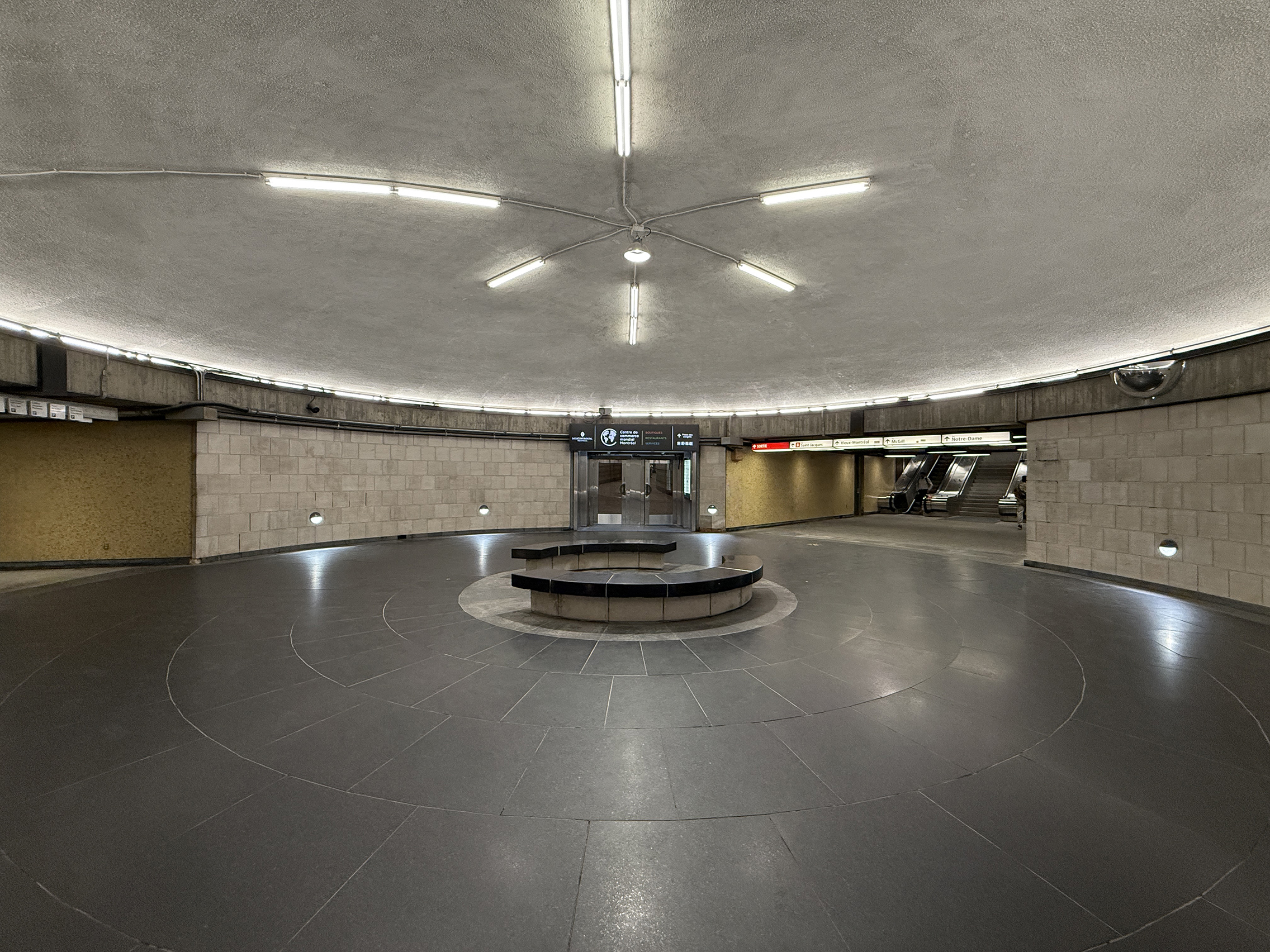
Underground access connect to different buildings

- International Civil Aviation Organization (ICAO)
- Tour Bell
- Tour Banque Nationale
- 1080 Beaver Hall Hill
- Place de la Cité internationale - Caisse de dépôt et placement du Québec
- W Hotel Montreal, a franchise of W Hotels
- Centre de commerce mondial de Montréal (Edifice Canada Steamship Lines, Hôtel Inter-Continental)
- Tour Aimia
- Tour de la Bourse (Bourse de Montréal, Place Victoria, Hôtel Delta Centre-Ville)
- Bonaventure metro station and points west
- Place-d'Armes metro station and points east

=== Other ===
- Quartier international de Montréal
- Cité Multimédia
- Saint Patrick's Basilica
- Victoria Square
- Place Félix-Martin - American Consulate-General
- Le Curateur public du Québec
- TD Canada Trust Building
- Royal Bank Building

== Film and television appearances ==
Square-Victoria–OACI as well as the portions of the station connecting to the Underground City appeared on the eighth season of the American reality TV competition The Amazing Race. It was part of the final leg of the race that season, which involved locations in Montana, Montreal and Toronto before ending in Upstate New York. It also made an appearance during the second season of the Canadian version of the show.

The station appeared in the 2014 movie X-Men: Days of Future Past, starring Hugh Jackman, where it was redressed to stand in for a Parisian metro station.
