= Jolicoeur station =

Montreal Metro station

Jolicoeur
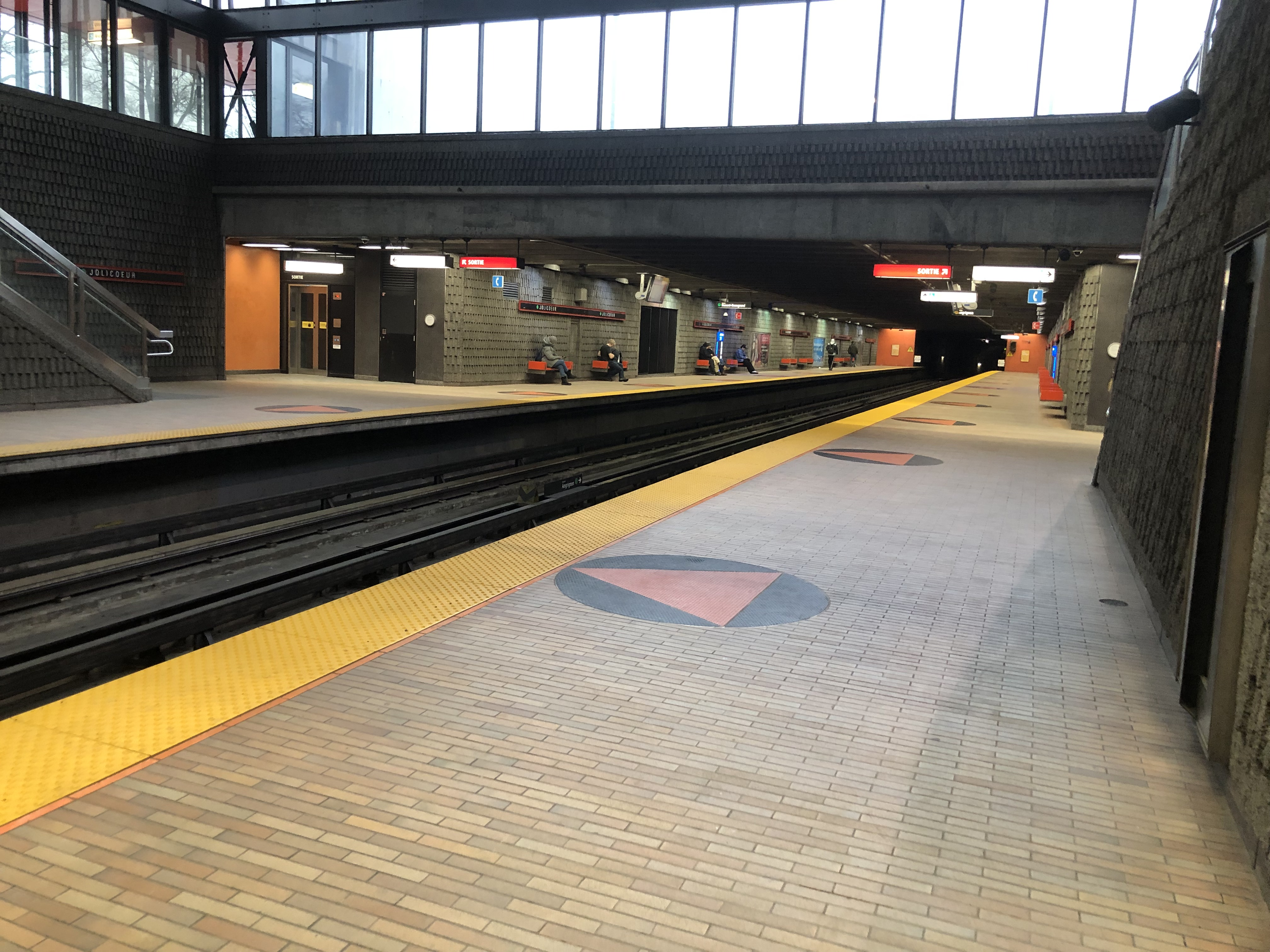

General information
- Location: 6200 Drake Street, Montreal, Quebec H4E 4J6; Canada
- Coordinates: 45°27′24″N 73°34′55″W
- Operator: Société de transport de Montréal
- Platforms: 2 side platforms
- Tracks: 2
- Connections: STM bus

Construction
- Depth: 4.6 metres (15 feet 1 inch), 60th deepest
- Accessible: Yes
- Architect: Claude Boucher

Other information
- Fare zone: ARTM: A

History
- Opened: 3 September 1978

Passengers
- 2024: 1,917,362 ▲12.18%
- Rank: 53 of 68

Services
Preceding station	Montreal Metro	Following station
Monk toward Angrignon	Green Line	Verdun toward Honoré-Beaugrand
Location

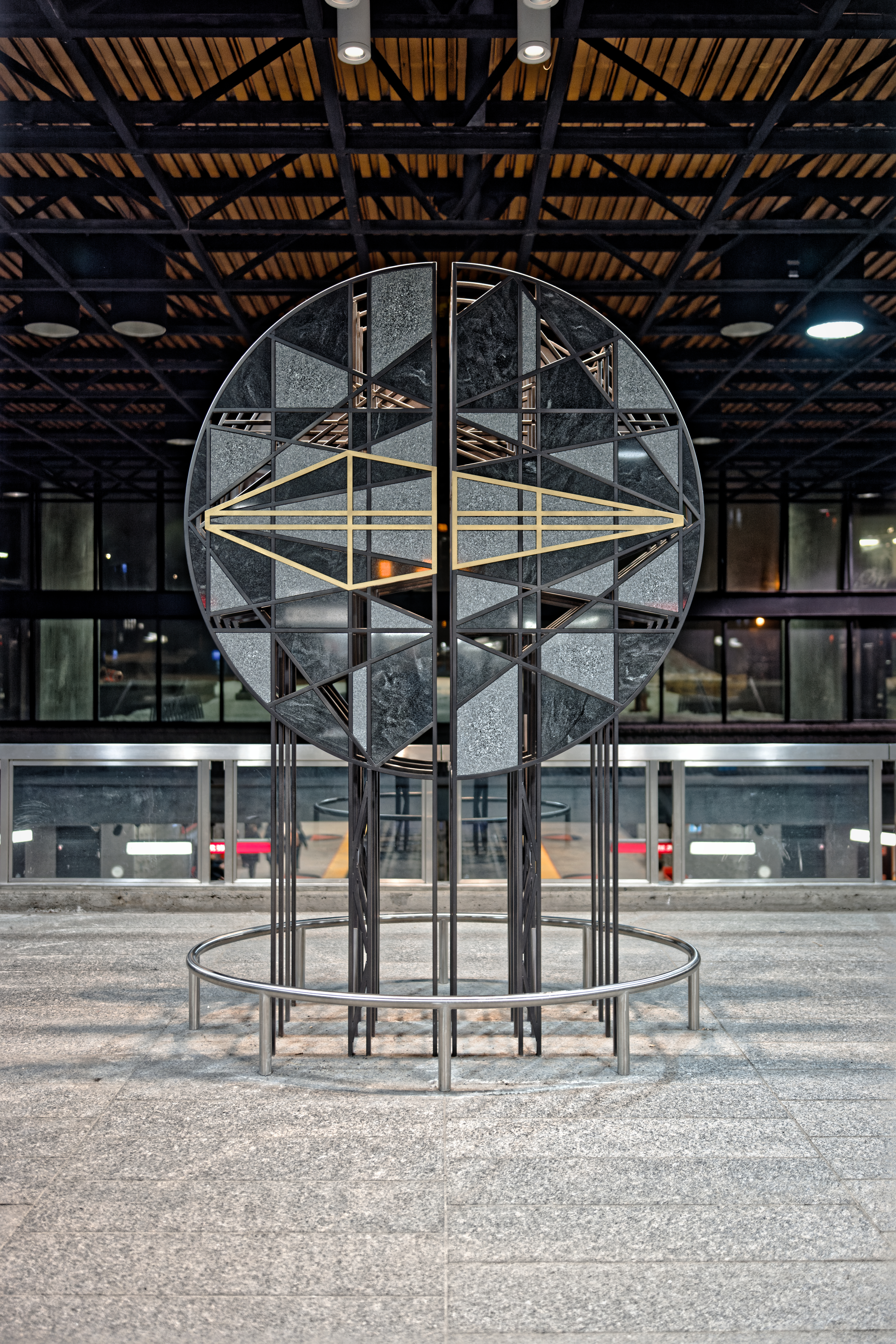
Perspective (Chloé Desjardins), Jolicoeur

Jolicoeur (French pronunciation: [ʒɔlikœʁ]) is a station on the Green Line of the Montreal Metro rapid transit system operated by the Société de transport de Montréal (STM). It is located in the Côte-Saint-Paul district in the borough of Le Sud-Ouest in Montreal, Quebec, Canada. The station opened on September 3, 1978, as part of the extension of the Green Line westward to Angrignon.

== Art and architecture ==
Designed by Claude Boucher, it is a side platform station, built in a shallow open cut, with the ticket hall integrated into a large glass-walled entrance pavilion. The design was influenced by the International Style architecture of Ludwig Mies van der Rohe. The floor of the platform level is decorated with a series of 42 circular ceramics by the architect.

== Renovation and upgrade works ==
In October 2019, work began to make the station universally accessible. To allow for the installation of elevators, the entrance building was expanded on both sides. As part of the project, a sculpture by Chloé Desjardins entitled Perspectives was installed on the main floor overlooking the platforms in June 2022. The work is inspired by the preexisting circular and triangular ceramics in the station. The upgrades were completed in December 2022, making Jolicoeur the 25th accessible station of the Metro, and the 6th station to be made accessible in 2022.

== Origin of the name ==
This station is named for rue Jolicoeur. Father Jean-Moïse Jolicoeur founded the parish of Notre-Dame-du-Perpétuel-Secours in 1906; the street was renamed in his honour in 1914.

== Connecting bus routes ==
There are no bus bays here and Société de transport de Montréal buses serve the station from curbside bus stops on Drake Street and Jolicoeur Street.

Société de transport de Montréal
No.	Route	Connects to	Service times / notes
37	Jolicoeur	Angrignon; LaSalle	Daily
112	Airlie	Terminus Lafleur / Newman	Daily
350 ☾	Verdun / LaSalle	Frontenac; Bonaventure; Gare Centrale; Terminus Centre-ville; Lucien-L'Allier; Atwater; Lionel-Groulx; LaSalle; De L'Église; Verdun; Monk	Night service

== Nearby points of interest ==
- Parc de La Vérendrye
- Canal de l'Aqueduc
