= Lucien-L'Allier station (Montreal Metro) =

Montreal Metro station

Lucien-L'Allier

General information
- Location: 955, rue Lucien-L'Allier; Montreal, Quebec H3G 2C2; Canada
- Coordinates: 45°29′42″N 73°34′16″W
- Operator: Société de transport de Montréal
- Platforms: 2 side platforms
- Tracks: 2
- Connections: STM bus; Vaudreuil-Hudson line; Saint-Jérôme line; Candiac line

Construction
- Depth: 27.1 metres (88 feet 11 inches), 3rd deepest
- Accessible: No
- Architect: David, Boulva & Cleve

Other information
- Fare zone: ARTM: A

History
- Opened: 28 April 1980

Passengers
- 2024: 2,296,969 ▲11.18%
- Rank: 48 of 68

Services
Preceding station	Montreal Metro	Following station
Georges-Vanier toward Côte-Vertu	Orange Line	Bonaventure toward Montmorency
Location

Lucien-L'Allier station (French pronunciation: [lysjɛ̃ lalje]) is a Montreal Metro station in the borough of Ville-Marie in Montreal, Quebec, Canada. It is operated by the Société de transport de Montréal (STM) and serves the Orange Line.

== Overview ==
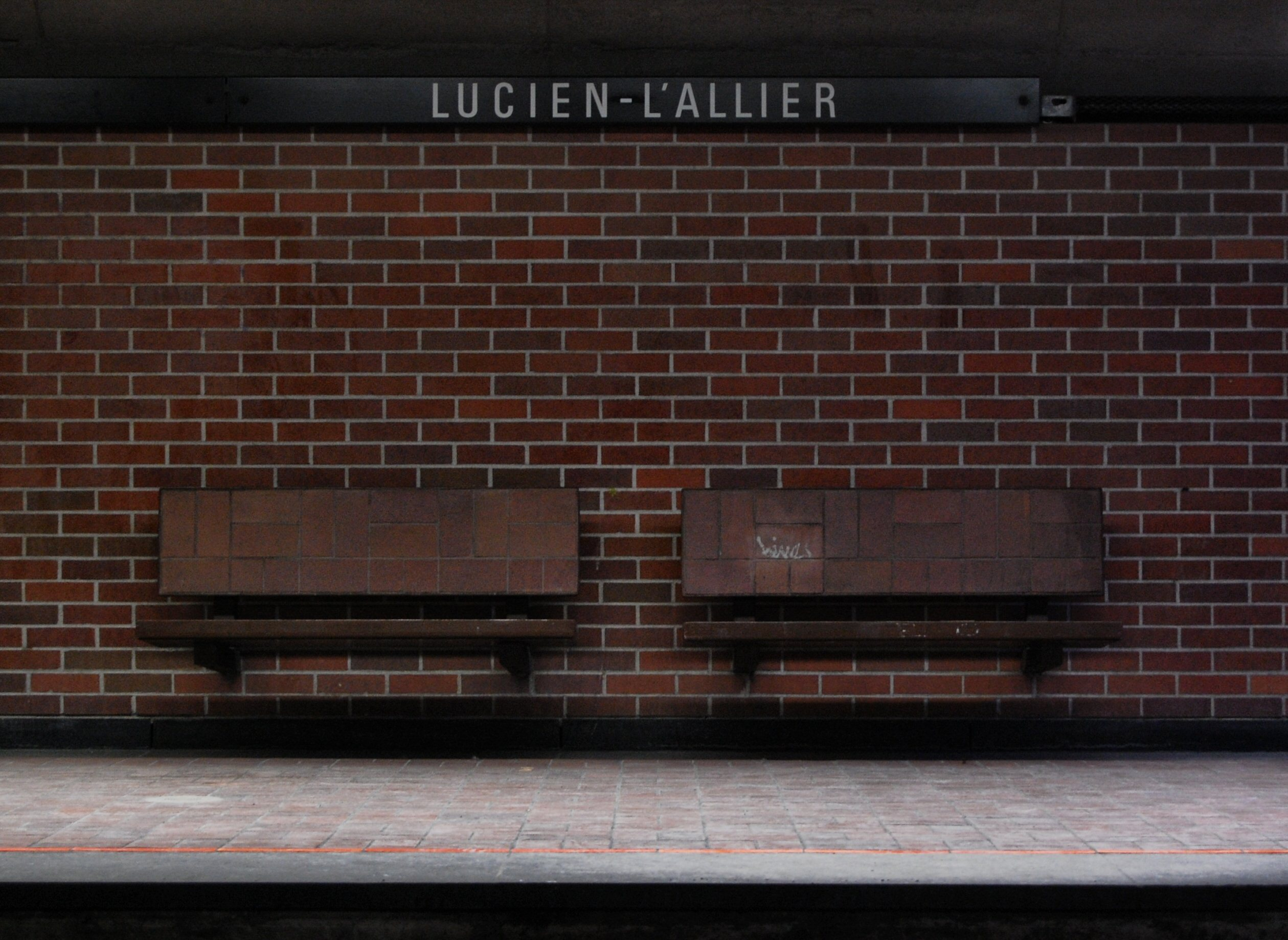
Benches at Lucien-L'Allier station

Concourse in 2026

The station, planned under the name "Aqueduc", was designed by the firm of David, Boulva & Cleve. A sculptural grille by Jean-Jacques Besner covering a ventilation shaft is the only artwork. The station is a normal side platform station, with a mezzanine on its eastern end, which is connected to the exit by an extremely deep open shaft. Passengers have to descend the greatest distance to reach the platforms of any station in Montreal (only Charlevoix and Berri–UQAM have deeper platforms, but those stations also have additional platforms that are shallower).

The station is intermodal with the Exo commuter rail lines; the entrance is connected by an enclosed walkway to Lucien-L'Allier station, a station that serves as the Downtown terminus for the Vaudreuil-Hudson, Saint-Jérôme, and Candiac lines. That train station was built as part of the Bell Centre and replaced the former Gare Windsor. It was initially called Terminus Windsor but was renamed for the Metro station to reduce confusion with the still-extant former station. It is also connected to Montreal's underground city.

== Origin of the name ==
This station is named for Lucien L'Allier Street, whose name was changed from rue de l'Aqueduc in order to commemorate Lucien L'Allier, chief engineer for the initial network of the Metro, as well as for the construction of Saint Helen's Island and Notre Dame Island for Expo 67. He had died while the station was under construction. A plaque in the station commemorates him.

== Connecting bus routes ==
Société de transport de Montréal
No.	Route	Connects to	Service times / notes
150	René-Lévesque	Atwater; Bonaventure; Gare Centrale; Terminus Centre-ville; Papineau	Daily
350 ☾	Verdun / LaSalle	Frontenac; Bonaventure; Gare Centrale; Terminus Centre-ville; Atwater; Lionel-Groulx; LaSalle; De L'Église; Verdun; Jolicoeur; Monk	Night service
355 ☾	Pie-IX	Saint-Michel-Montréal-Nord; Pie-IX; Frontenac; Bonaventure; Gare Centrale; Terminus Centre-ville; Atwater	Night service
358 ☾	René-Lévesque	Frontenac; Papineau; Bonaventure; Gare Centrale; Terminus Centre-ville; Atwater	Night service
364 ☾	Sherbrooke / Joseph-Renaud	Honoré-Beaugrand; Radisson; Langelier; Cadillac; Frontenac; Bonaventure; Gare Centrale; Terminus Centre-ville; Atwater	Night service
410	Express Notre-Dame	Bonaventure; Gare Centrale; Terminus Centre-ville	Weekdays, peak only
420	Express Notre-Dame-de-Grâce	Peel; McGill; Bonaventure; Gare Centrale; Terminus Centre-ville	Weekdays only
430	Express Pointe-aux-Trembles	Pointe-aux-Trembles; Sherbrooke East Park and Ride; Bonaventure; Gare Centrale; Terminus Centre-ville	Weekdays only
480	Express Du Parc	Parc; Place-des-Arts; Bonaventure; Gare Centrale; Terminus Centre-ville	Weekdays, peak only
747 ✈	YUL Airport / Downtown	Gare d'autocars de Montréal; Berri-UQAM; Bonaventure; Gare Centrale; Terminus Centre-ville; Lionel-Groulx	Daily Some runs start or end at Lionel-Groulx Metro Station

== Nearby points of interest ==
=== Connected via the underground city ===
- Lucien-L'Allier Exo station
- Bell Centre / Montreal Canadiens
- Windsor Station / Canadian Pacific Railway
- 1250 René-Lévesque
- Terminus Centre-Ville
- Bonaventure Metro station and points east

=== Other ===
- Cité du commerce électronique
- Concordia University / Fine Arts pavilion
- YWCA
