= Côte-Saint-Paul =

- Neighbourhood
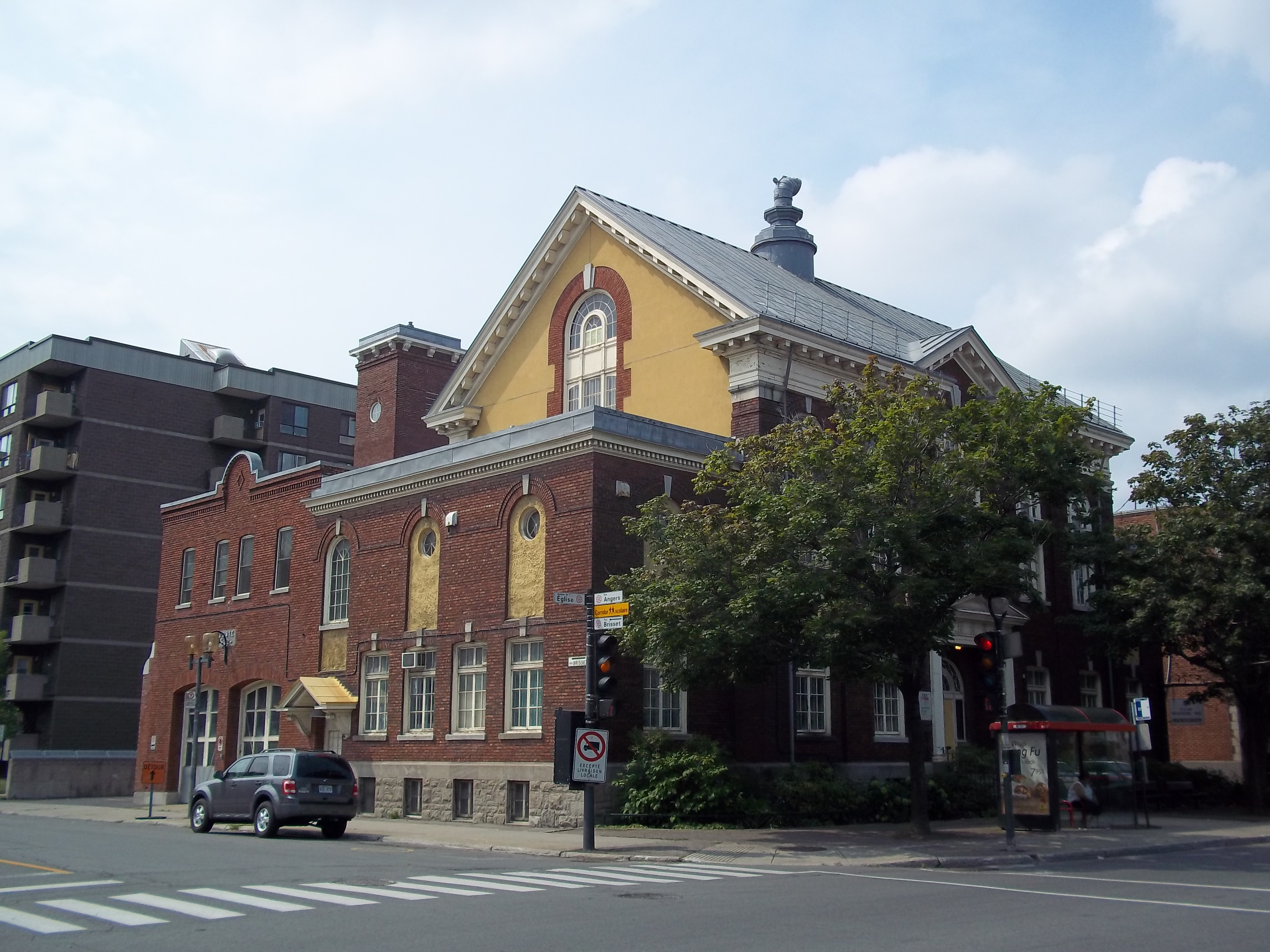
- Former City Hall

- Location of Côte-Saint-Paul in Montreal
- Coordinates: 45.463056°N 73.596389°W
- Country: Canada
- Province: Quebec
- City: Montreal
- Borough: Le Sud-Ouest

Area
  - Total: 2.84 km^{2} (1.10 sq mi)

Population (2021)
  - Total: 16 403
  - Density: 5,775.7/km^{2} (14,959/sq mi)
- Postal Code: H4E
- Area codes: 514, 438

Côte-Saint-Paul (French pronunciation: [kot sɛ̃ pɔl]) is a neighbourhood located in the Southwest Borough of Montreal, Quebec, Canada.

== History ==
The concession of côte Saint-Paul was granted by the Sulpician Order, seigneurs of the Island of Montreal, in 1662. It extended northward from the current site past the current location of the Lachine Canal to Lac à la Loutre, which was then located at the foot of the Falaise Saint-Jacques, where the Turcot yards are today. The area was essentially agricultural, and remained so until the Lachine Canal bisected the area in 1825; Lac à la Loutre was dried out. Chemin de la Rivière-Saint-Pierre (now avenue de l'Église) was built to join Chemin de la Côte-des-Argoulets (Boulevard LaSalle) with the Chemin de la Côte-Saint-Paul (Rue Saint-Patrick).

With the canal providing water power for factories, workers started to move in nearby, forming the nucleus of the community in the triangle bounded by the Lachine Canal, Rue Angers, and Avenue de l'Église. The village of Côte-Saint-Paul was founded in 1874. The first Église Saint-Paul was built in 1875, and a town hall and railway station soon followed. The western part of the village separated in 1878, forming the Parish Municipality of Côte-Saint-Paul, later Ville-Émard. The balance of the village of Côte-Saint-Paul became a town in 1894 and was renamed Saint-Paul in 1897.

Clockwise from the north, the town of Saint-Paul was bounded by the Lachine Canal, the Grand Trunk Railway, the north bank of the Aqueduct Canal, the property line behind the lots on the west side of Frontenac Street (now Rue Leprohon), a property line just north of Rielle Street (now Rue Laurendeau), First Avenue (now Rue le Caron), and St. Louis Street (now Rue Briand).

In 1910, Saint-Paul merged into the city of Montreal, along with neighbouring Ville-Émard. Industrial development continued and the remaining agricultural lands were converted to housing. However, like the rest of the Lachine Canal area, the neighbourhood went into decline with the construction of the St. Lawrence Seaway. The construction of the Décarie Expressway and the Turcot Interchange in 1964 tore through the heart of old Saint-Paul, though it spared the institutional buildings along Avenue de l'Église. In 1978, the Montreal Metro reached Côte-Saint-Paul with the construction of Jolicoeur metro station.

In 2002, the area became part of the borough of Le Sud-Ouest. Today, the western limit of the neighbourhood Côte-Saint-Paul is not precisely defined, but it is somewhat expanded to the west of the official limit in its days as an independent town, with the building-up of the agricultural land since then and the destruction of the town's centre.

== Geography ==
The neighbourhood is bordered to the south by Desmarchais Boulevard, to the west by Monk Boulevard, to east by the aqueduct, and to the north by the Lachine Canal and the railroad track bordering Pointe-Saint-Charles. Côte-Saint-Paul can be accessed by the De La Vérendrye exit on Quebec Autoroute 15.

== Infrastructure ==
The neighbourhood is served by the Jolicoeur Montreal Metro station. It is crossed and bordered by the Lachine Canal and the Aqueduct Canal.

Parc de La Vérendrye and Parc Saint-Paul offer recreation, and the Aqueduc and Lachine Canal bicycle paths are linked by a path through the Côte Saint-Paul industrial area east of the Décarie Expressway.
