= Gare d'autocars de Montréal =

Bus terminal in Montreal, Quebec

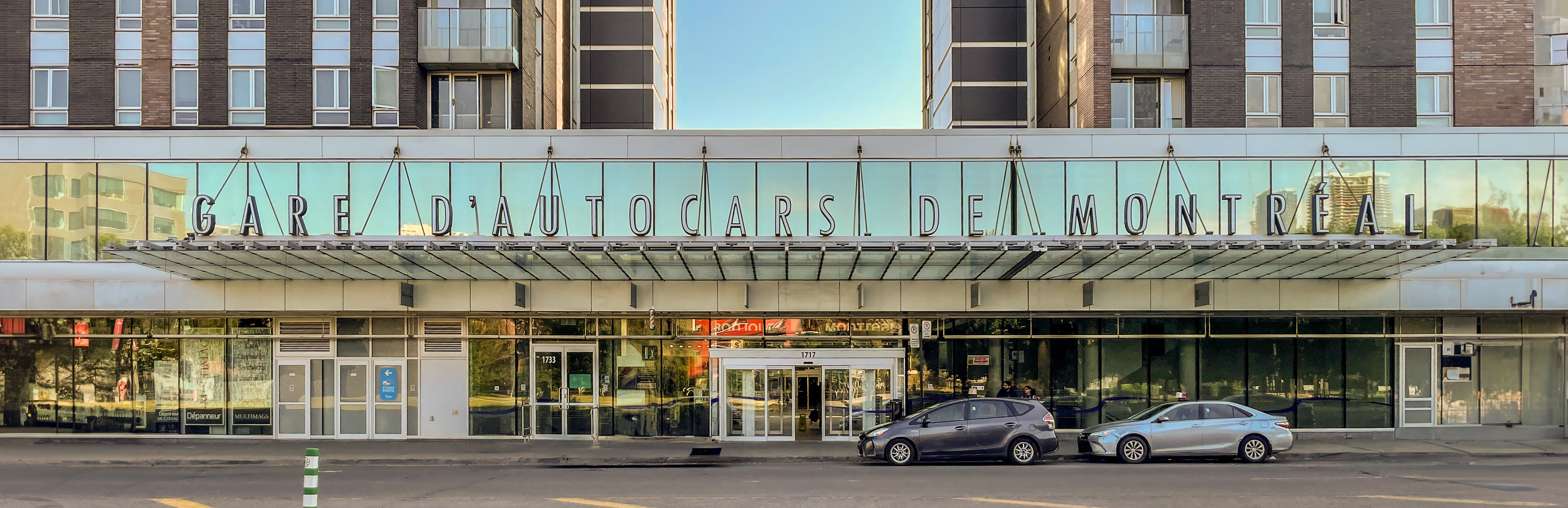
- Entrance to Gare d'autocars de Montréal

General information
- Location: 1717 Rue Berri; Montreal, Quebec; Canada
- Coordinates: 45.5168580°N 73.5635490°W
- Owner: 2011-2015: Government of Quebec; 2015-2017: Agence métropolitaine de transport; 2017-present: Autorité régionale de transport métropolitain
- Bus operators: FlixBus; Groupe Galland; Greyhound Lines; Limocar; Autobus Maheux; Orléans Express; Trailways of New York; STM bus
- Connections: at Berri–UQAM; at Berri–UQAM Terminus

Construction
- Accessible: Yes

Other information
- Website: gamtl.com/en

History
- Opened: 1951
- Rebuilt: December 8, 2011
Location

Bus terminal interior

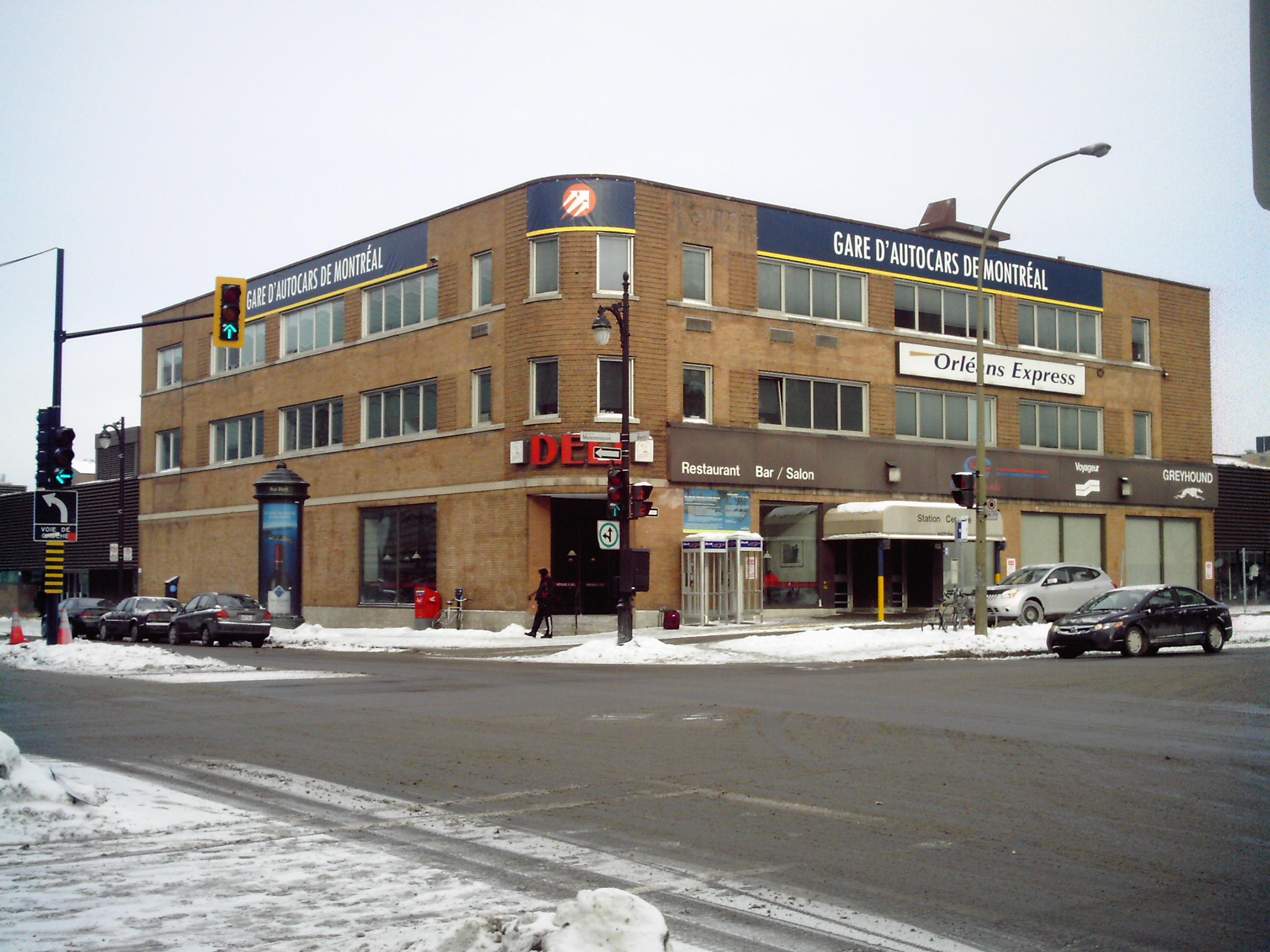
The former Central Bus Station located at 505 De Maisonneuve Boulevard East.

Gare d'autocars de Montréal (English: Montreal Coach Terminal) is a bus terminal located in Montreal, Quebec, Canada. It is the departure and arrival point for most inter-city buses. Nearly 300 buses serve the terminal per day.

Buses connect Montreal with many cities, mostly in Quebec, Ontario, and the state of New York in the United States.

This bus station is not to be confused with Terminus Centre-Ville, which is used for public transit buses from the South Shore of Montreal, and Montreal Central Station, served by Amtrak, Exo, and Via Rail trains.

The new bus station opened on Thursday, December 8, 2011, at the corner of Berri Street and Ontario Street. It is adjacent to the previous bus station which is located at the corner of Berri and De Maisonneuve Boulevard East. The old station was formerly known as Station Centrale d'Autobus Montréal (English: Montreal Central Bus Station), and Terminus Voyageur before that, back when Voyageur Colonial Bus Lines was the station's major tenant.

== Intercity coaches ==
Intercity coaches
Bus Company	Destinations
Autobus Maheux	Rouyn-Noranda via Grand-Remous, Montcerf-Lytton, Rapid Lake, Kitcisakik, Val-d'Or, Malartic and Rivière-Héva
FlixBus	Ottawa via Autoroute 50 and Gatineau
Greyhound	New York via Plattsburgh, Glens Falls, Saratoga Springs, Albany, Ridgewood; Boston via St. Albans, Burlington, Montpelier, White River Junction, Hanover, Concord, Manchester and Manchester–Boston Regional Airport
Trailways of New York	New York via Plattsburgh, Glen Falls, Saratoga Springs, Albany and Ridgewood
Groupe Galland	Mont-Tremblant and Mont-Laurier via Saint-Jérôme, Saint-Sauveur, Sainte-Adèle, Val-Morin, Sainte-Agathe-des-Monts, Labelle, Rivière-Rouge, Lac-Saguay and Lac-des-Écorces
Limocar	Sherbrooke; Express via Bromont and Magog; Local via Rougemont, Saint-Césaire, Saint-Paul-d'Abbotsford, Granby, Bromont, Waterloo, Stukely-Sud, Eastman and Magog; Granby via Bromont; Cowansville via Bromont
Orléans Express	Quebec City; Express via Sainte-Foy; Via Drummondville and Sainte-Foy; Via Trois-Rivières and Sainte-Foy; Local via Saint-Hyacinthe, Drummondville, Victoriaville and Sainte-Foy; Gatineau via Highway 417 and Ottawa

Megabus is the only carrier not using the station. Instead, all departures and arrivals are at 997 Rue Saint-Antoine Ouest, on the premises of 1000 de La Gauchetière and adjacent to Terminus Centre-Ville.

== Société de transport de Montréal ==
The station is connected to the Montreal Metro system at the Berri–UQAM station.

Bus route 747 bus departs from Gate 15 of Gare d'autocars, offering service to Montréal–Trudeau International Airport. Other routes serve the station via nearby on-street stops.

== See also ==
- Montreal Central Station
