= Groupe Galland =

Bus transit

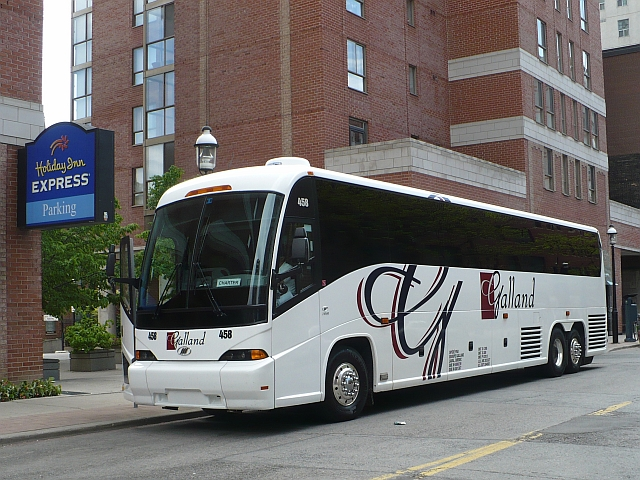
- A Galland bus on a trip to Toronto in 2009
- Founded: 1941; 84 years ago
- Headquarters: 3874 du Souvenir, Laval, Quebec, Canada
- Service area: Quebec
- Service type: coach, school bus, paratransit, public transit
- Fleet: 150
- Website: www.galland-bus.com

Groupe Galland is a Canadian bus company that operates in Laval, Quebec. It operates charter and scheduled intercity coaches, school buses and paratransit vehicles, as well as providing maintenance service for heavy vehicles.

The company operates together with its affiliated companies Autobus Galland ltée, Galland Laurentides ltée, Centre du Camion Galland ltée, Les Autobus Duplessis inc. and Galland Mont-Tremblant ltée.

As of 2020, Groupe Galland operated 150 buses and offered courier services via bus parcel express.

== History ==
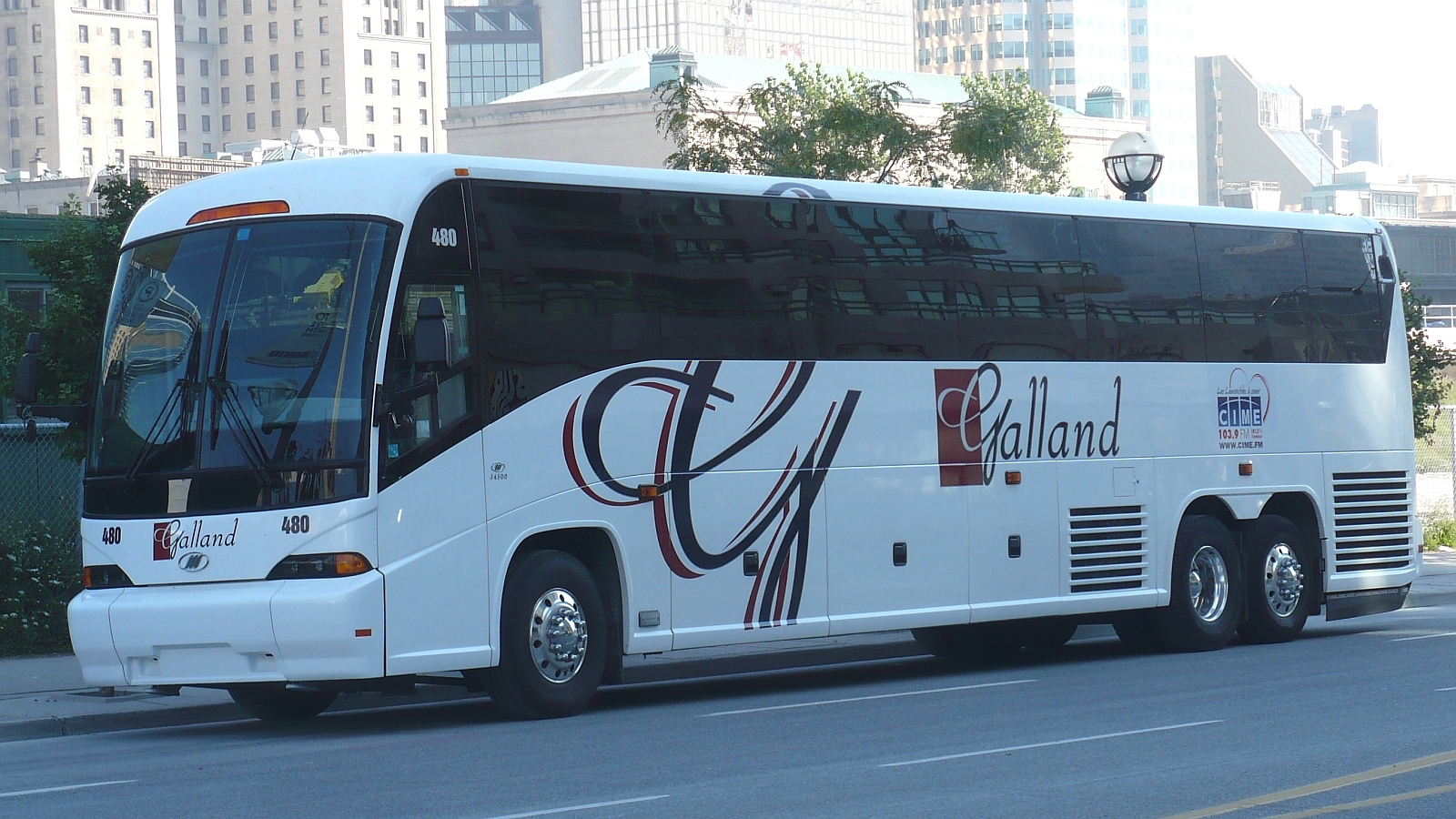
Groupe Galland coach 480 in 2008

In 1941, Paul Galland founded the company in Sainte-Scholastique, Quebec. He later retired and turned the business over to his sons.

In 2004 or 2005, the company acquired the Montreal to Laurentians bus routes formerly operated by Limocar.

== Operations ==
- Montreal to Mont-Tremblant, Quebec route
- Montreal to Mont-Laurier, Quebec route
- Mont-Tremblant public transit
