= Papineau station =

Montreal Metro station

Papineau
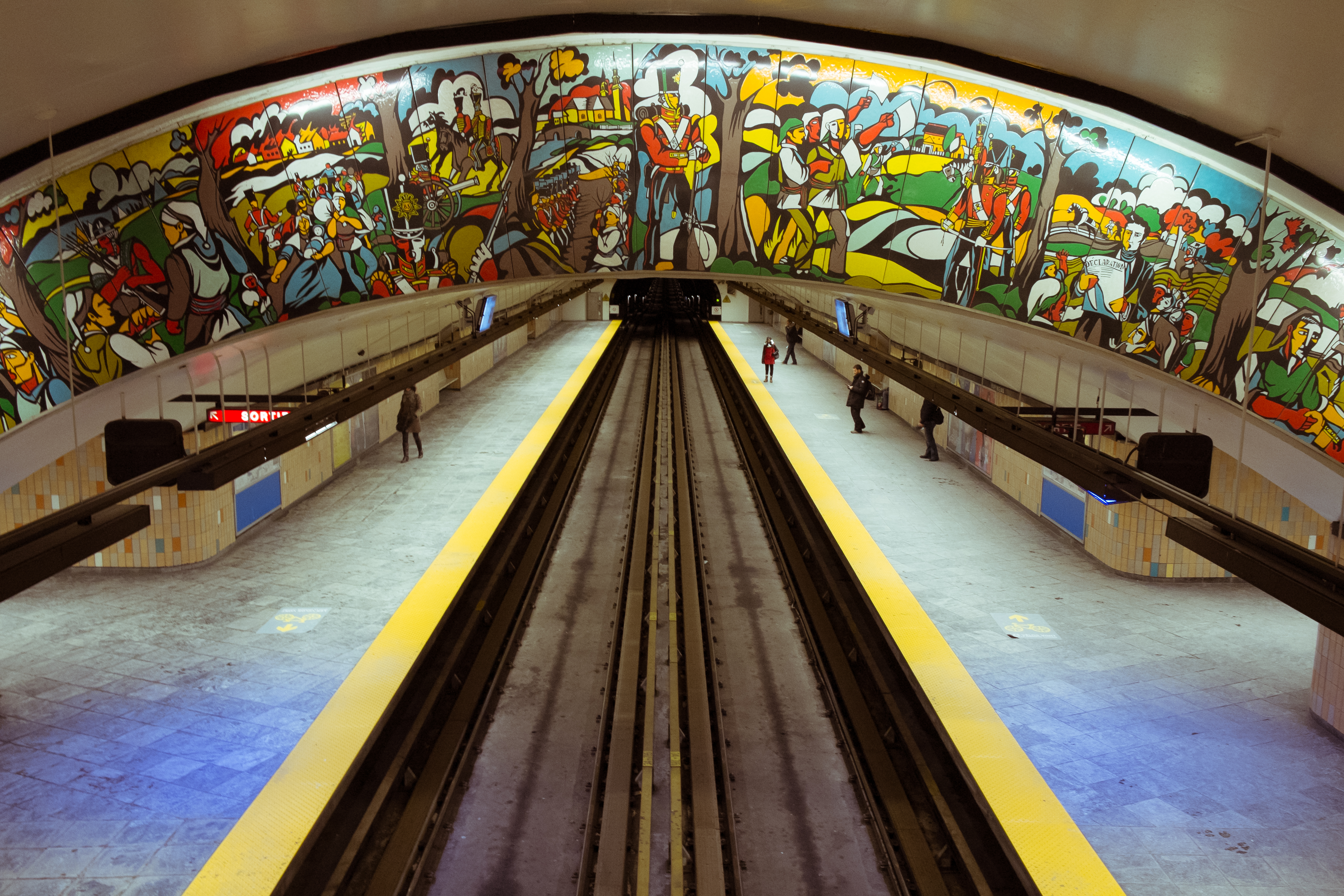

General information
- Location: 1425, rue Cartier; Montreal, Quebec; H2K 4C8
- Coordinates: 45°31′25″N 73°33′08″W
- Operator: Société de transport de Montréal
- Platforms: 2 side platforms
- Tracks: 2
- Connections: STM bus; Réseau de transport de Longueuil

Construction
- Depth: 21.6 metres (70 feet 10 inches), 13th deepest
- Accessible: No
- Architect: Bolduc et Venne; Mario Bibeau (kiosk built in 1999)

Other information
- Fare zone: ARTM: A

History
- Opened: 14 October 1966

Passengers
- 2024: 2,553,514 ▲3.76%
- Rank: 42 of 68

Services
Preceding station	Montreal Metro	Following station
Beaudry toward Angrignon	Green Line	Frontenac toward Honoré-Beaugrand
Location

Papineau station (French pronunciation: [papino]) is a Montreal Metro station in the borough of Ville-Marie in Montreal, Quebec, Canada. It is operated by the Société de transport de Montréal (STM) and serves the Green Line. It is one of two Metro stations that service Montreal's Gay Village, part of the Centre-Sud district. It opened on October 14, 1966, as part of the original network of the Metro. It briefly served as the terminus of the Green Line until Frontenac station opened two months later.

== Overview ==
Designed by Bolduc et Venne, it is a normal side platform station, built in tunnel. A transept leads to a long set of stairways to the entrance, located in the centre of a public square. The temporary entrance building was recently replaced by a new permanent one, designed by Mario Bibeau.

In 2022, the STM's Universal Accessibility Report noted that design work to make the station accessible was underway.

== Architecture and art ==
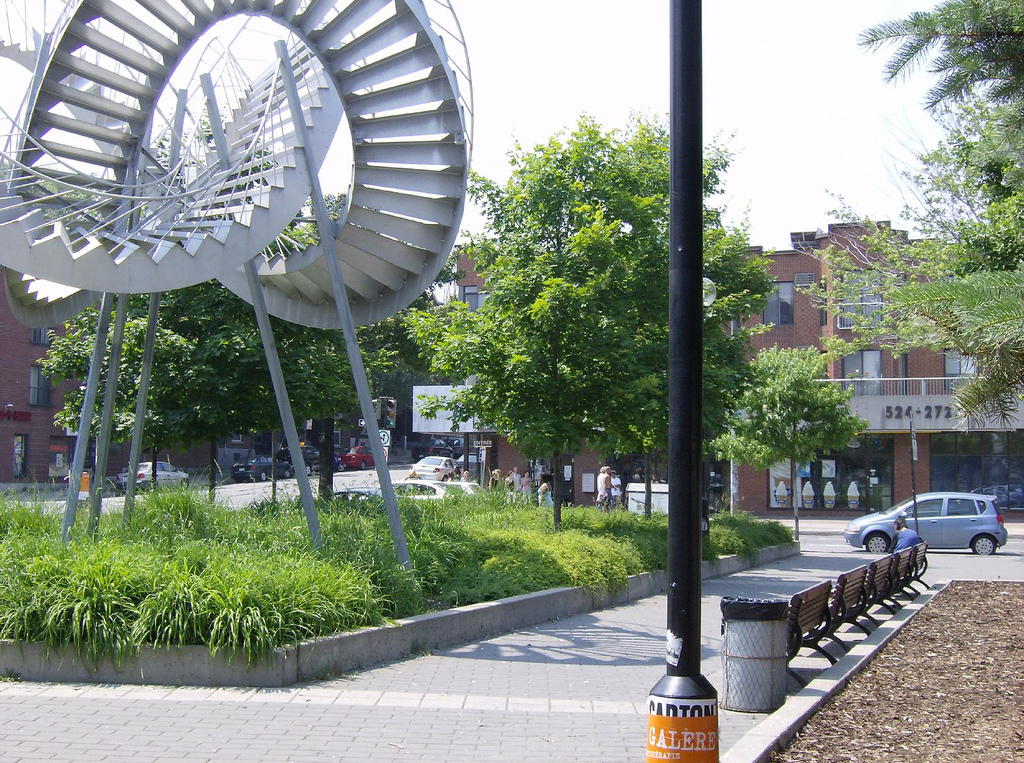
Michel de Broin's Revolutions (2003) is sited in the park beside the station

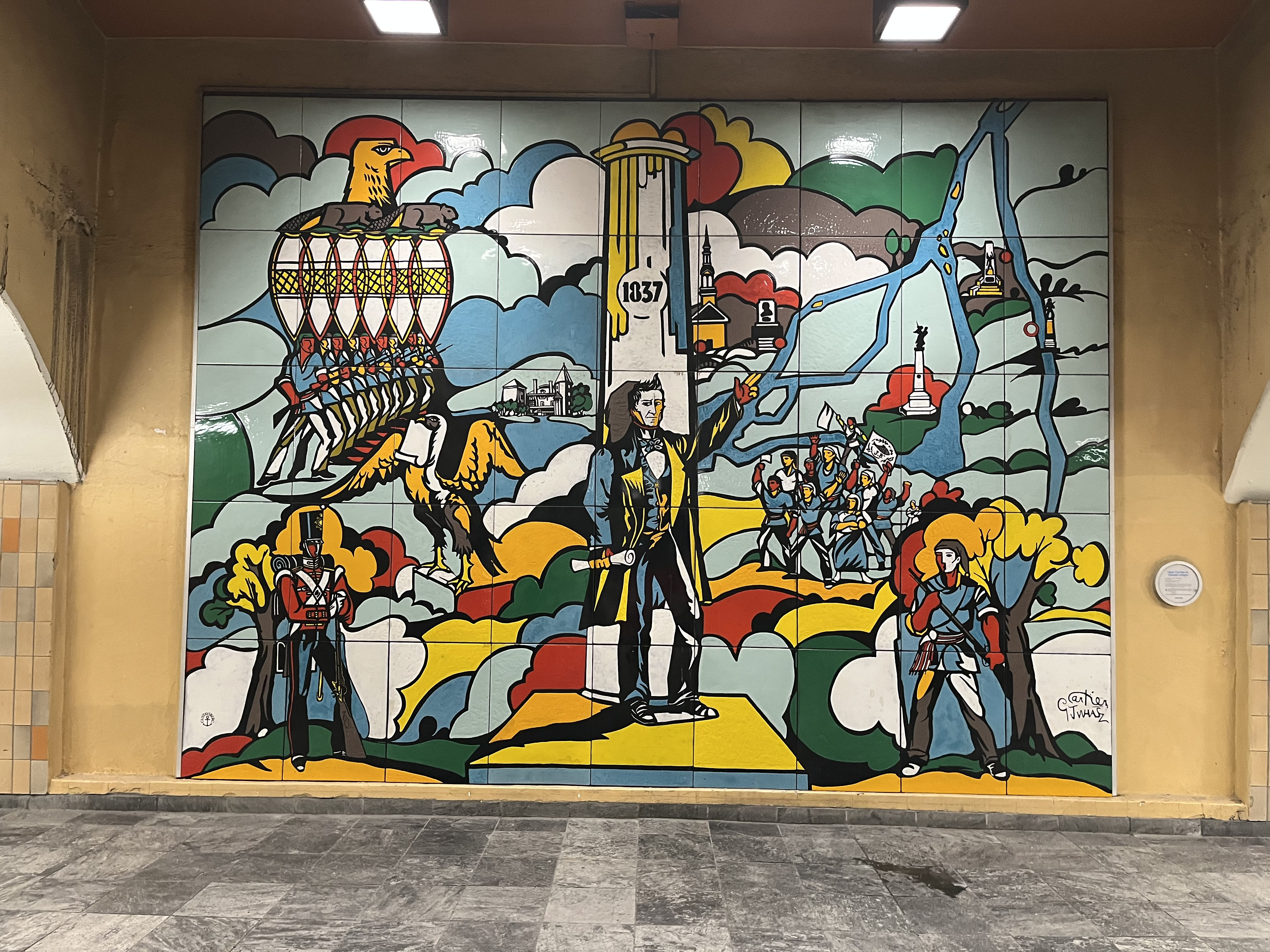
One of the three murals comprising Les Patriotes de 1837–1838, by Jean Cartier and George Juhasz

The station features a set of three murals by Jean Cartier and George Juhasz at the transept level. Entitled Les Patriotes de 1837–1838, these tell the story of the Patriotes Rebellion and commemorate Louis-Joseph Papineau, the famous son of this station's namesake. Also, the redevelopment of the square around the station's entrance included the addition of a sculpture, Révolutions, by Michel de Broin.

== Origin of the name ==
Papineau takes its name from nearby av. Papineau, named for Joseph Papineau, a notary, surveyor, politician, and defender of the rights of the people and of the French language. His son, Louis-Joseph Papineau, led the Patriotes Rebellion, the Lower Canadian portion of the Rebellions of 1837.

== Connecting bus routes ==
Société de transport de Montréal
No.	Route	Connects to	Service times / notes
10	De Lorimier		Daily
34	Sainte-Catherine	Viau	Daily
45	Papineau	Fabre	Daily
150	René-Lévesque	Atwater; Bonaventure; Gare Centrale; Terminus Centre-ville; Lucien-L'Allier	Daily
358 ☾	René-Lévesque	Frontenac; Bonaventure; Gare Centrale; Terminus Centre-ville; Lucien-L'Allier; Atwater	Night service
359 ☾	Papineau	Fabre	Night service
445	Express Papineau	Bonaventure; Gare Centrale; Terminus Centre-ville	Weekdays, peak only
769	La Ronde / Station Papineau		Summer weekends only, serves La Ronde
Réseau de transport de Longueuil
No.	Route	Connects to	Service time / notes
170	Station Papineau / Ste-Hélène / J.-Cartier		Weekdays, peak only

== Nearby points of interest ==
- The Village
- Jacques Cartier Bridge
- Édifice de la sécurité publique
- CFCF-DT / CTV studios
- CFJP-DT / Noovo studios
- RDS studios
- CFTM-DT / TVA studios
- Sonolab
- Confédération des syndicats nationaux
- Télé-Québec
- Téléport de Montréal
- Hôpital Notre-Dame
