= Central Station, Montreal =

Central Station is the common English name for two different transport facilities in Montreal:

- Central Station, the city's intercity railway station and a commuter train station;
- Station Centrale d'Autobus Montreal, the city's intercity bus terminal.
