= Limocar =

Canadian bus operator

Transdev Limocar
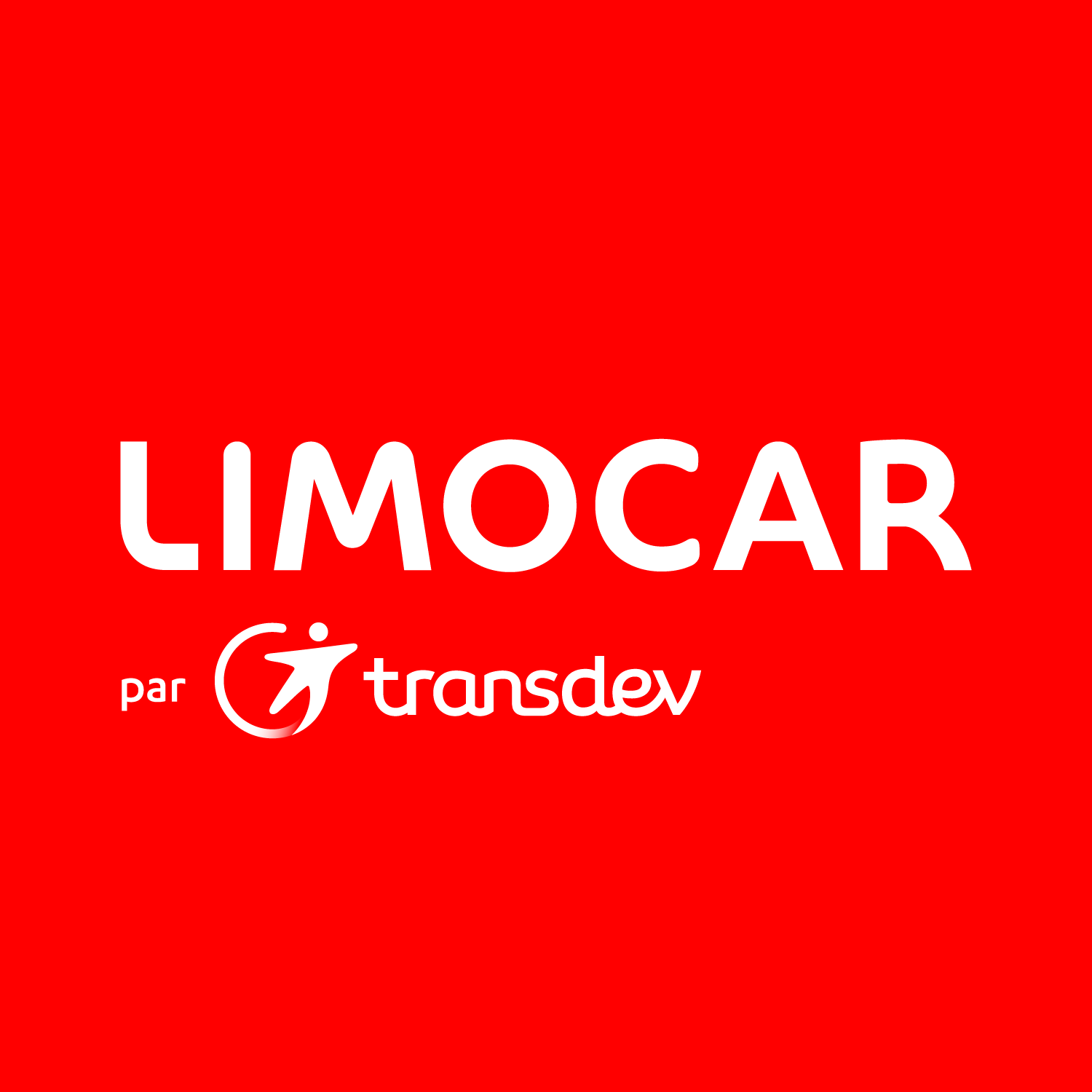

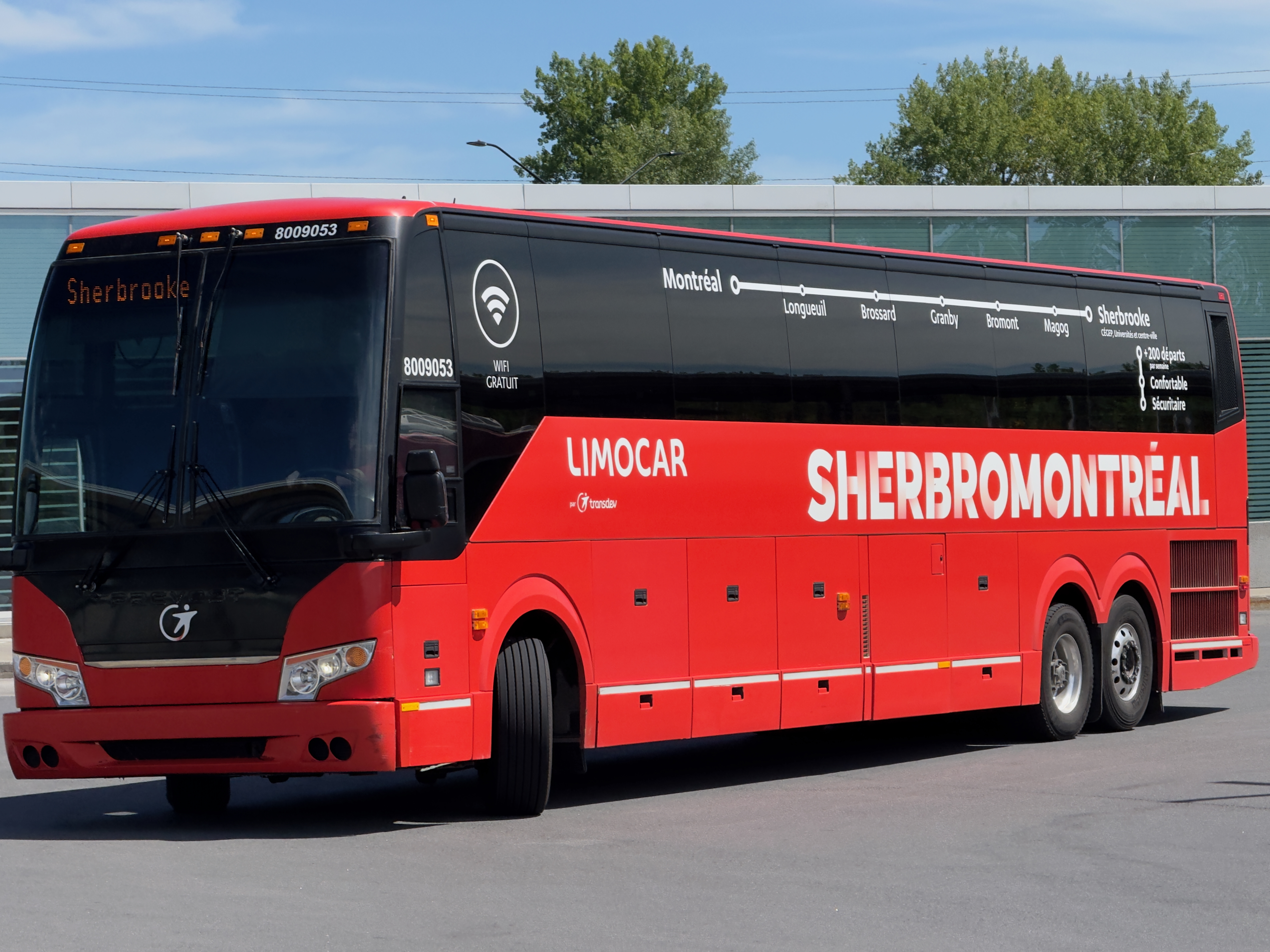
- A Limocar coach at Brossard station.
- Parent: Transdev
- Headquarters: 4243 Marcel Lacasse, Boisbriand, Quebec
- Service area: Estrie, Montérégie and North Montreal
- Service type: bus service, public transit, school bus, paratransit
- Website: limocar.ca/en/home/

Logo circa 2013

Logo prior to Transdev takeover

Limocar is a coach operator in Quebec, Canada founded in 1979, with a fleet of 320 vehicles. It operates the only regular bus service between Montreal and Sherbrooke provides the public transportation service (Conseil Intermunicipal de Transport) for several Quebec municipalities as well as school buses and wheel-chair transportation.

The old Transdev acquired the business in 2007. It is now a subsidiary of the new Transdev.

== Public transit operations ==
- CIT Laurentides
- CIT Vallée du Richelieu
- CIT Roussillon
- CIT du Sud-Ouest

== Expedibus ==
Expedibus is a package shipping and courier company, operated cooperatively throughout Quebec by Orléans Express, Intercar, Autobus Maheux and Limocar.

== See also ==
- Gare d'autocars de Montréal
