= 1000 de La Gauchetière =

Office skyscraper in Montreal, Quebec, Canada

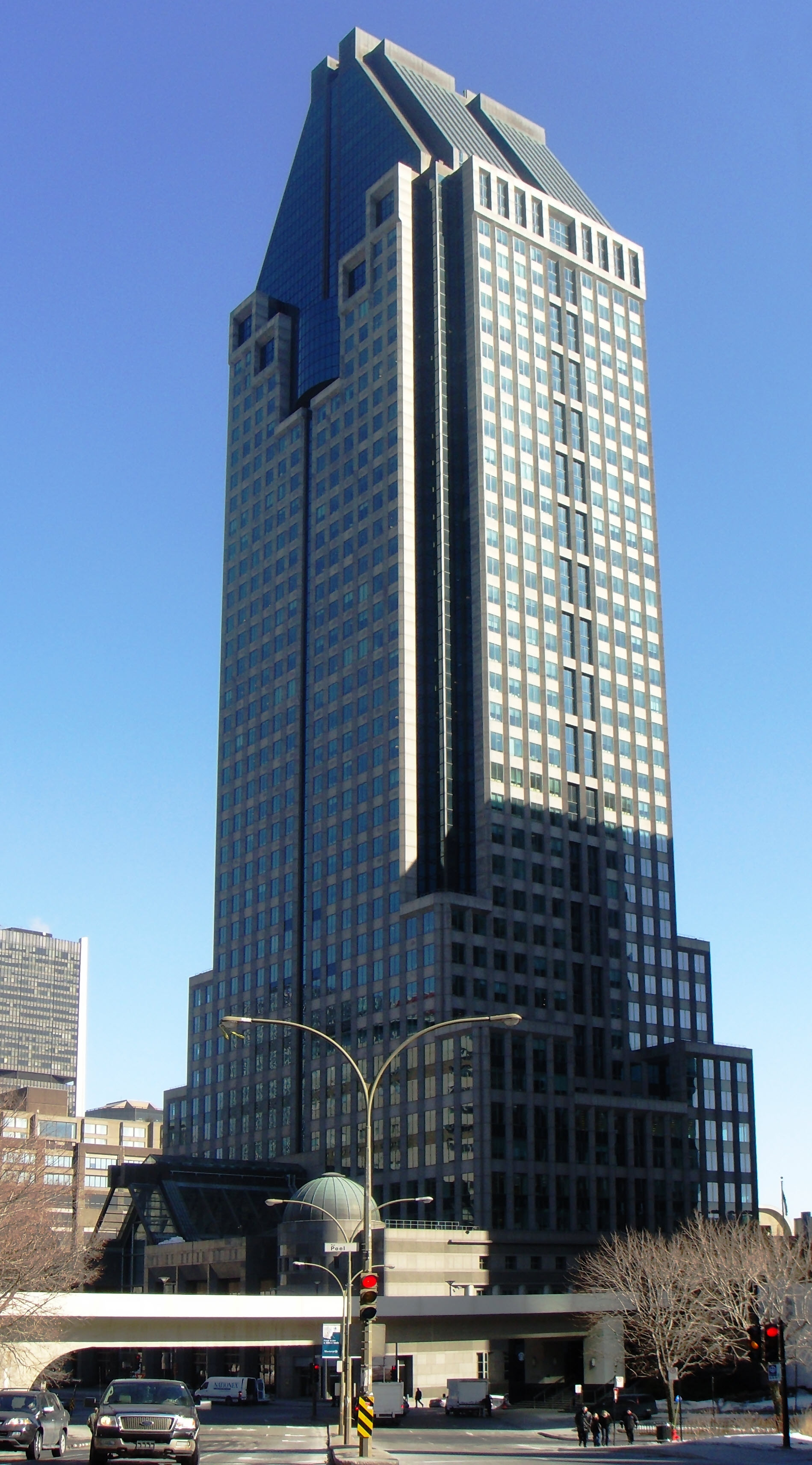

General information
- Type: Office
- Architectural style: Postmodern
- Location: 1000 De la Gauchetière west, Montreal, Quebec; H3B 4W5
- Coordinates: 45.498243°N 73.566274°W
- Completed: 1992
- Client: Bell Canada and Teleglobe
- Owner: Groupe Mach

Height
- Roof: 205 m (673 ft)

Technical details
- Floor count: 51
- Floor area: 153,300 m^{2} (1,650,000 sq ft)
- Lifts/elevators: 22

Design and construction
- Architecture firm: Lemay & Associates, Dimakopoulos & Associates
- Main contractor: Pomerleau

Website
- www.le1000.com/en

1000 de la Gauchetière is a skyscraper in Montreal, Quebec, Canada. It is named for its address at 1000 De la Gauchetière Street West in the downtown core. A popular feature of the building is its atrium, which holds a large ice skating rink.

It is Montreal's tallest building as per the height definition of the National Building Code of Canada that is used by the city of Montreal, which excludes spires. For international comparison, spires are included as per the Council on Tall Buildings and Urban Habitat's most widely used height definition for building height and the building is thus the second tallest building as per this definition. It rises to the maximum elevation approved by the city (the elevation of Mount Royal) at 232.5m above mean sea level with a total height from the average ground level around first floor to roof of 205m (673ft) and 51 floors. The building was not subject to the 1992 municipal maximum height of 200m because it was finished in 1992.

== History ==
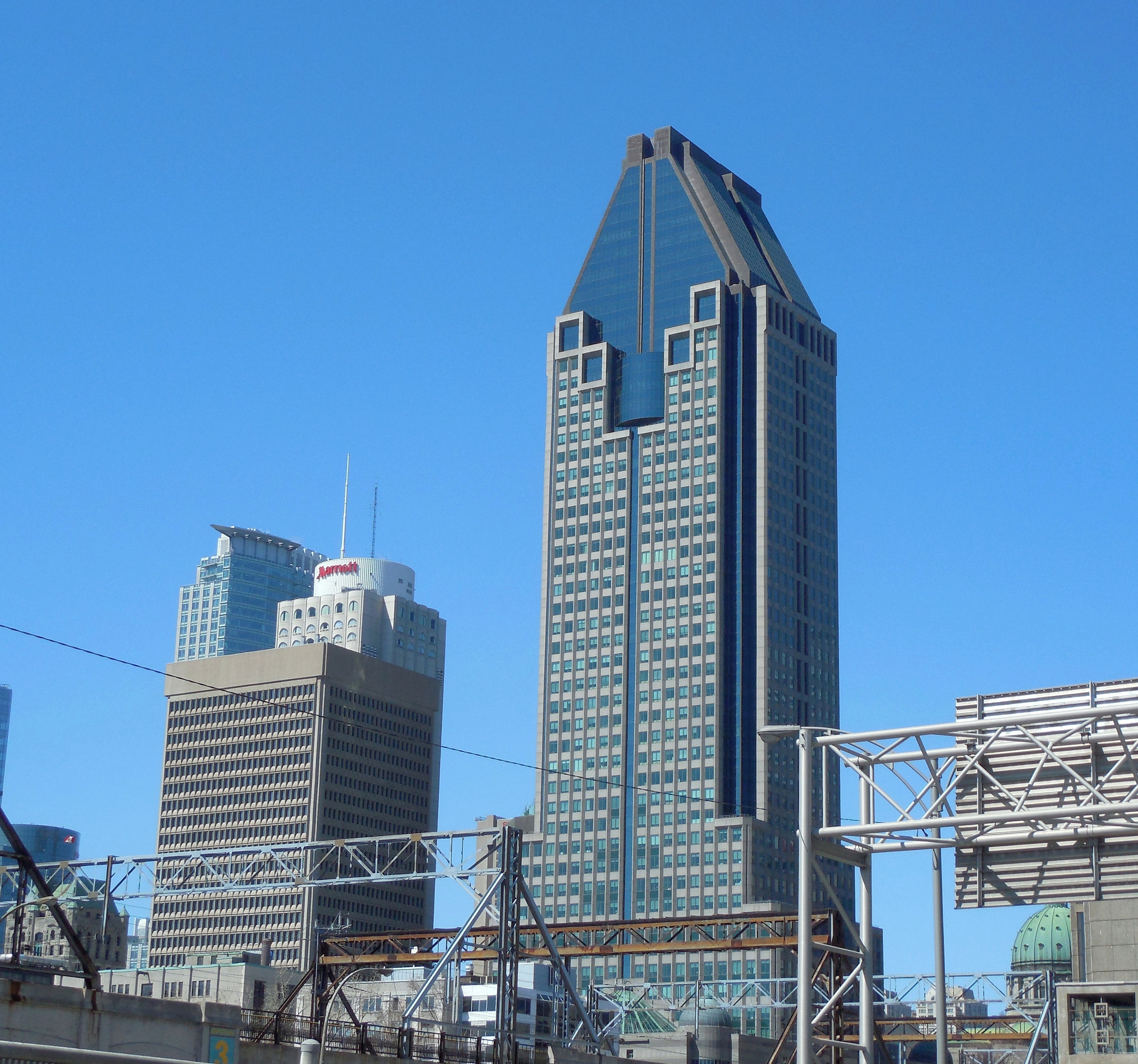
View of the skyscraper from the southeast

The building was designed by Lemay & Associates and Dimakopoulos & Associates architects, and built in 1992 at the same time as the nearby 1250 René-Lévesque which rises at 47 floors. It is an example of postmodern architecture, with a distinctive triangular copper roof as well as four copper-capped rotunda entrances at the tower base corners, which were inspired from the Mary, Queen of the World Cathedral on the north side of the building, following the trend set by Place de la Cathédrale (KPMG Tower) of Montreal skyscrapers borrowing some of their design from that of the nearest church. Also, the semispherical corner caps mirror the shape of the half-circular windows of neighbouring Marriott Château Champlain hotel, which were themselves inspired by the arches of the adjoining Windsor Station.

The 1000 de la Gauchetière was built by Pomerleau Inc., the largest construction company in Quebec and one of the top general contractors in Canada.

When it was built, 1000 de la Gauchetière was owned jointly by Bell Canada and Teleglobe. In 2002, SITQ, a division of the Caisse de dépôt et placement du Québec (CDPQ), bought the building for CA$184 million. With the merger of all CDPQ real estate assets in 2011, ownership has been transferred to Ivanhoé Cambridge. In 2021, it was bought by the real estate companies MACH and Groupe Petra.

== Height and architecture ==
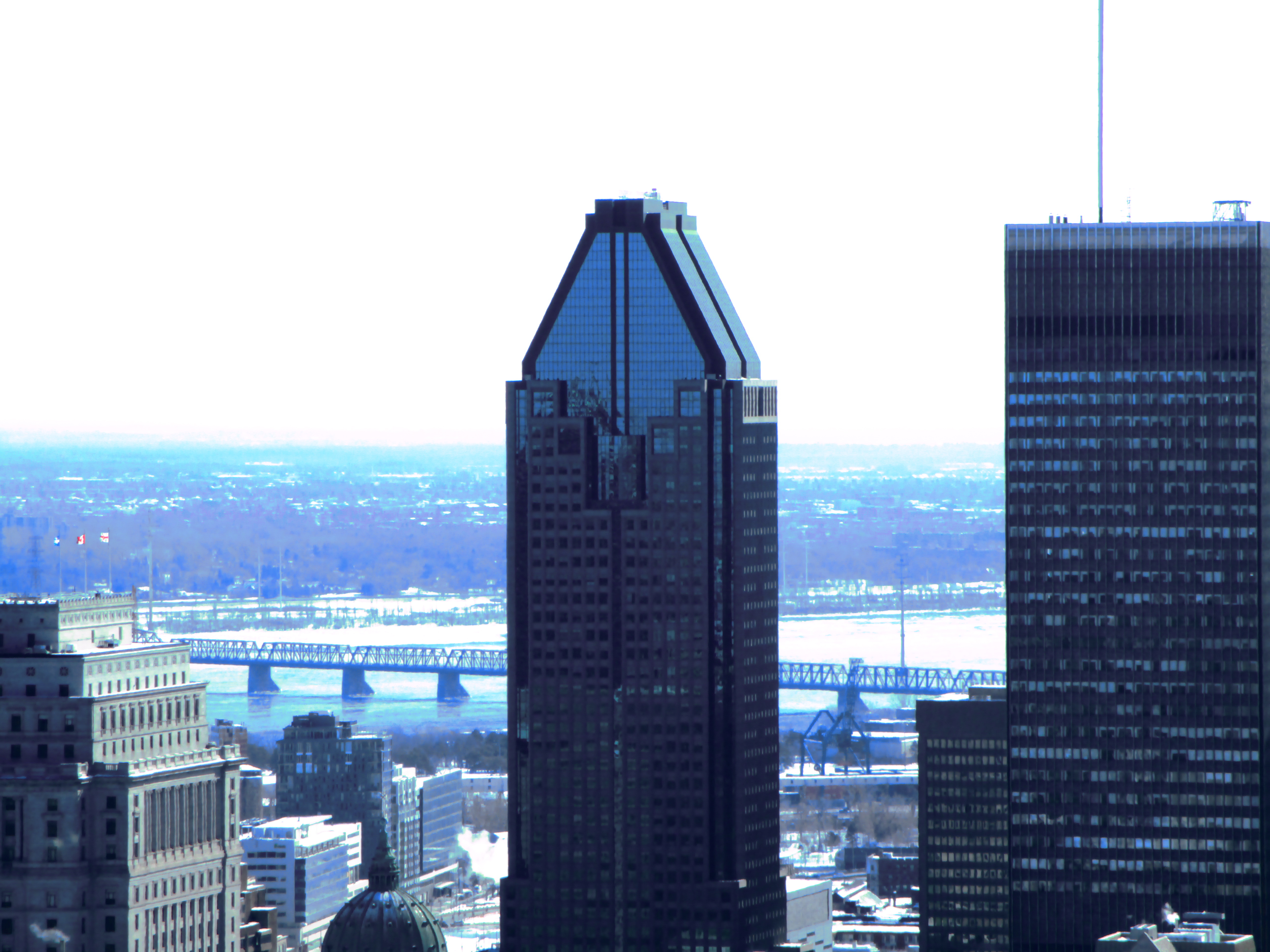
The 1000 de la Gauchetière as seen from the Mount Royal Chalet

To be precise, the tower is Montreal's tallest if it is measured to the roof. Although 1250 René-Lévesque possesses a spire that exceeds 1000 de La Gauchetière in height, the building itself is shorter. Also, when it is viewed as part of the skyline, 1000 de la Gauchetière appears from certain angles to be shorter because it is built on lower ground, allowing it to be taller while it still obeyed height restrictions relative to Mount Royal.

The building's structural core is of concrete, with steel making up the rest of the floorplates. It is serviced by 22 elevators, and its recessed corners allow up to 12 corner offices per floor.

The building's architecture is similar to that of the Chase Tower in Dallas, Texas, United States, but with the street-level architecture projecting out in a distinct style, reducing the visual and psychological impact of the entire building from this viewpoint. Such details are features of postmodern architecture.

== Features ==
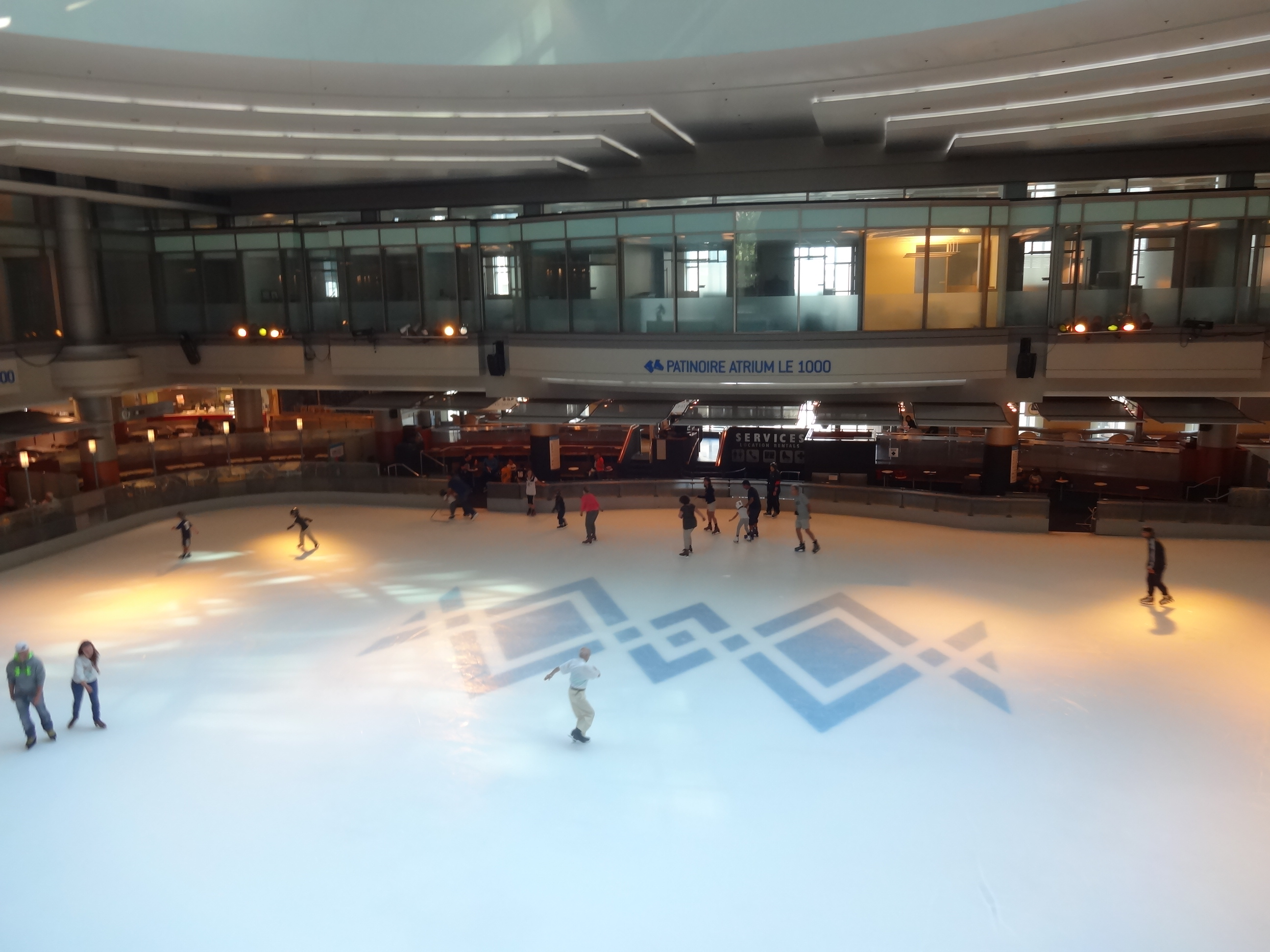
Indoor skating rink located on the ground floor within the Patinoire Atrium le 1000.

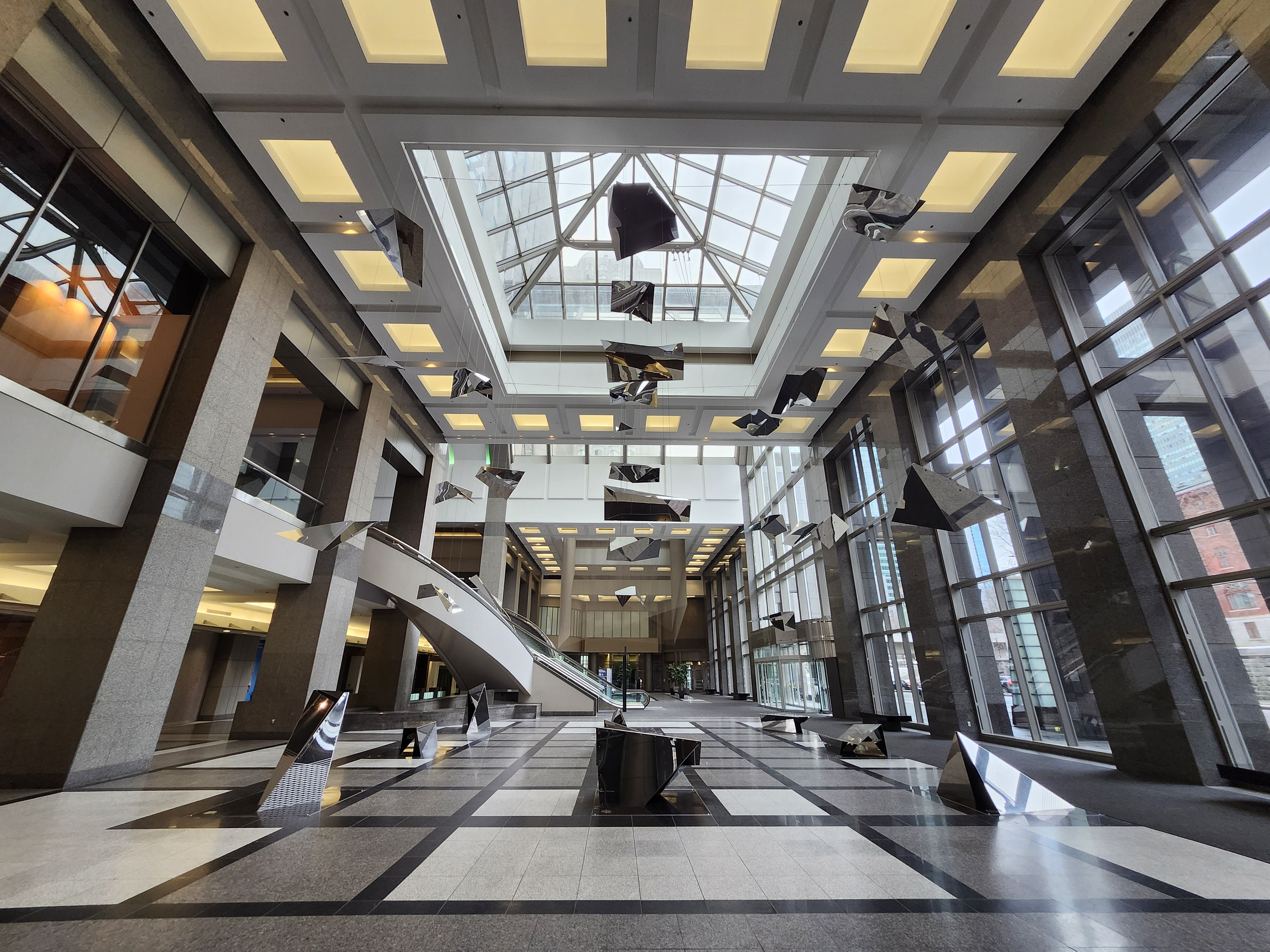
Skylights and suspended shapes within the grand foyer

In addition to its office space and shopping areas, it includes a full-size indoor ice skating rink, a physical fitness centre, a bus terminal (the Downtown Terminus) serving city and commuter buses to certain South Shore communities, and links to other underground city buildings, Central Station, Lucien-L'Allier Station and the Bonaventure Metro station.

== Tenants ==
- Analysis Group, Inc.
- Borden Ladner Gervais LLP
- BDO
- Cofomo
- De Grandpré Chait LLP
- Fidelity Investments
- Osler, Hoskin & Harcourt LLP
- McCarthy Tétrault LLP
- RBC Dominion Securities
- Raymond James
- IWG
- Rogers Communications
- Boston Consulting Group
- Miller Thomson

== See also ==
- List of tallest buildings in Montreal
- List of skyscrapers
