= Place Bonaventure =

Commercial building in Quebec, Canada

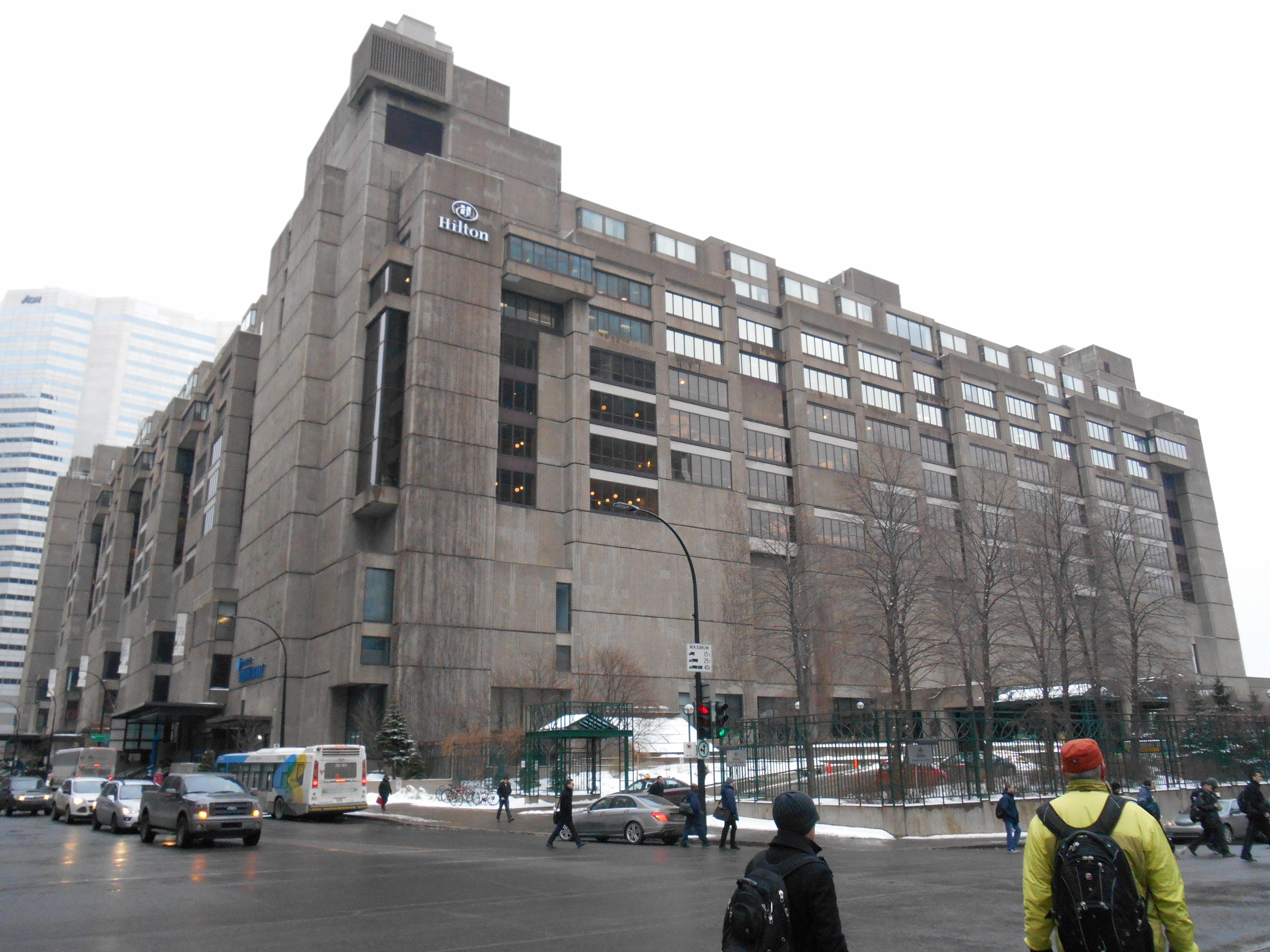
- Interactive map of the Place Bonaventure area

General information
- Type: Commercial
- Location: 800, rue de la Gauchetière Ouest; Montreal, Quebec, Canada; H5A 1K6
- Coordinates: 45.4994°N 73.5651°W
- Construction started: 1964
- Completed: 1967
- Cost: C$82.5 million

Technical details
- Floor count: 12
- Floor area: 288,000 m^{2} (3,100,000 sq ft)
- Lifts/elevators: 27

Design and construction
- Architect: Arcop

Other information
- Public transit: at Bonaventure station Terminus Centre-Ville Montreal Gare Centrale Station

Place Bonaventure (French pronunciation: [plas bɔnavɑ̃tyʁ]) is an office, exhibition, and hotel complex in Downtown Montreal, Quebec, Canada, adjacent to the city's Central Station. At 288,000 m^{2} (3,100,000 sq ft) in size, Place Bonaventure was the second-largest commercial building in the world at the time of its completion in 1967. It is one of very few buildings in Canada to have its own postal code prefix, H5A.

== History ==
Place Bonaventure was first conceived as an exhibition hall, international trade centre, and hotel. The building covers an area of 2 ha (4.9 acres) and is built over 18 CNR tracks leading to Central Station. Construction began in 1964 and was completed in 1967.

Designed in the Brutalist style, the exterior walls are poured-in-place, ribbed sand-blasted concrete, with the interior walls sand-blasted concrete or brick.

Concordia Hall was a 23,000 m^{2} (250,000 sq ft) exhibition hall. The first trade show was hosted in 1966, while the upper floors were still being constructed. Adjacent to this vast space are two large mezzanines. In 2020, it was announced that the exhibition hall would close (due to larger spaces available today, like the nearby Palais des congrès de Montréal [Montreal Convention Center]).

When Place Bonaventure opened, there were five floors of wholesale suppliers above Concordia Hall, featuring fashions, home furnishings, and children's toys. An additional floor contained the offices of the principal trading nations of the world. At ground level there were two floors of retail shopping mall. All these uses disappeared over the years.

In 1998 Place Bonaventure was renovated at an expense of CAD$60 million. The building was redesigned to offer large, continuous office space. Retail space was significantly reduced. Windows were added to all four sides, on all floors, to allow light into the new office spaces.

The building takes its name from Bonaventure Station, a former railway station located nearby. A planned expansion to the south was never constructed.

Today, Place Bonaventure is owned by PSP Investments and Kevric Real Estate Corporation.

== Tenants ==
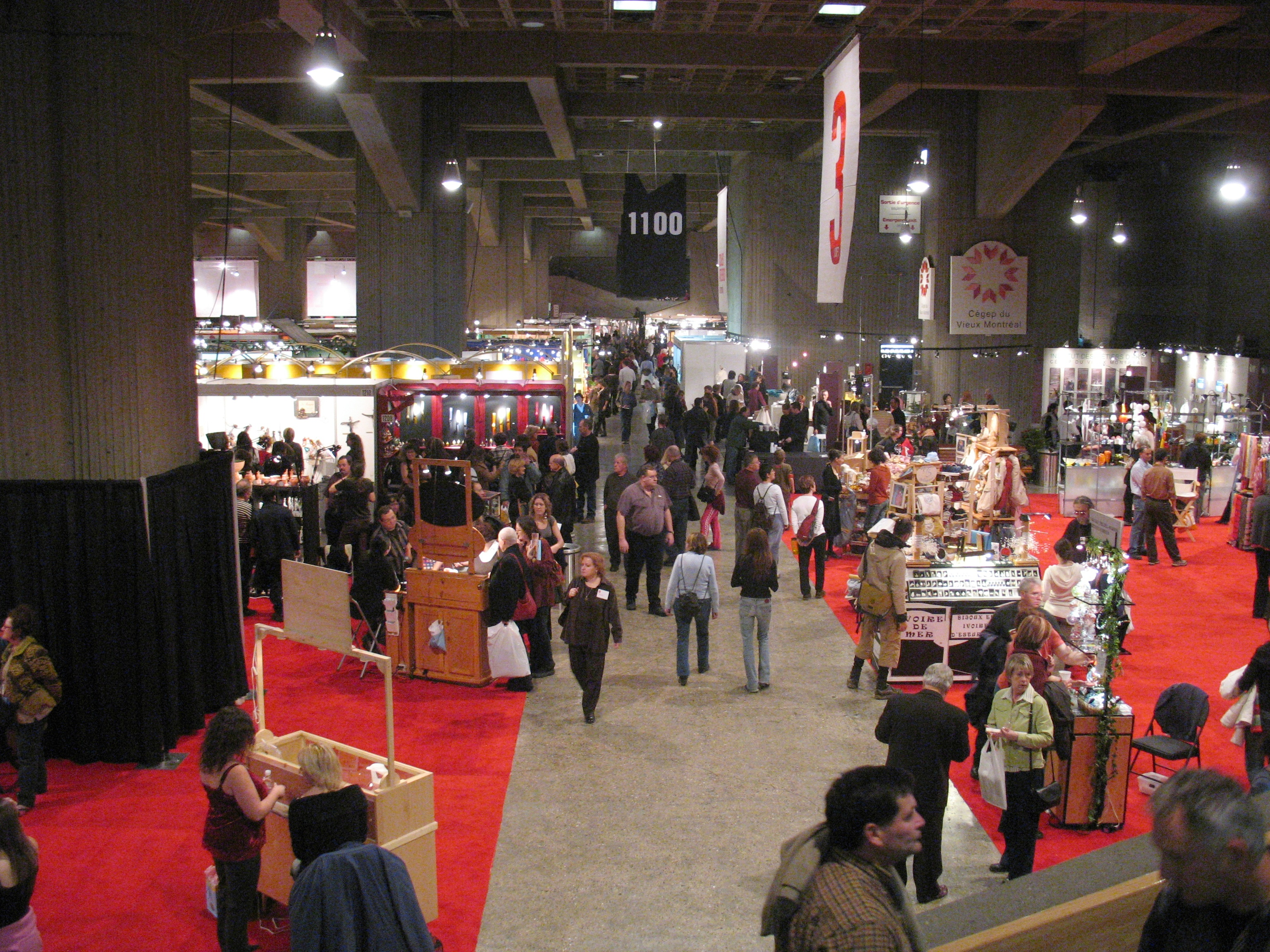
Convention area.

The complex houses a 397-room rooftop hotel, Hotel Bonaventure Montreal (formerly a Westin then a Hilton Hotel), featuring a year-round heated rooftop outdoor pool, a 2.5-acre rooftop garden with trees, flowers and waterfalls, a jacuzzi, and a dry sauna. The hotel's meeting space, fully renovated in 2018, totals 50,000 sq ft (4,600 m^{2}) and boasts Montreal's largest ballroom without obstructions (15,000 sq ft (1,400 m^{2})), as well as 20,000 sq ft (1,900 m^{2}) of exhibition space. Other major tenants include the Société de transport de Montréal (headquarters), Fido, Cogeco radio stations, BMO Financial Group, and a few federal government departments.

== Access ==
Place Bonaventure is connected to Montreal's underground city. It is also linked to the Bonaventure Metro station, exo commuter train stations (Lucien-L'Allier and Central Station), the ARTM's downtown bus terminus, and intercity train service (Via and Amtrak, at Central Station).

== Sources ==
- Ede, Carol (1971). Canadian Architecture 1960/70. Toronto: Burns and MacEachern. p. 264. ISBN 0-88768-021-6.
