= Mont-Tremblant public transit =

Public transit system in Mont Tremblant, Quebec, Canada

BUS Mont-Tremblant

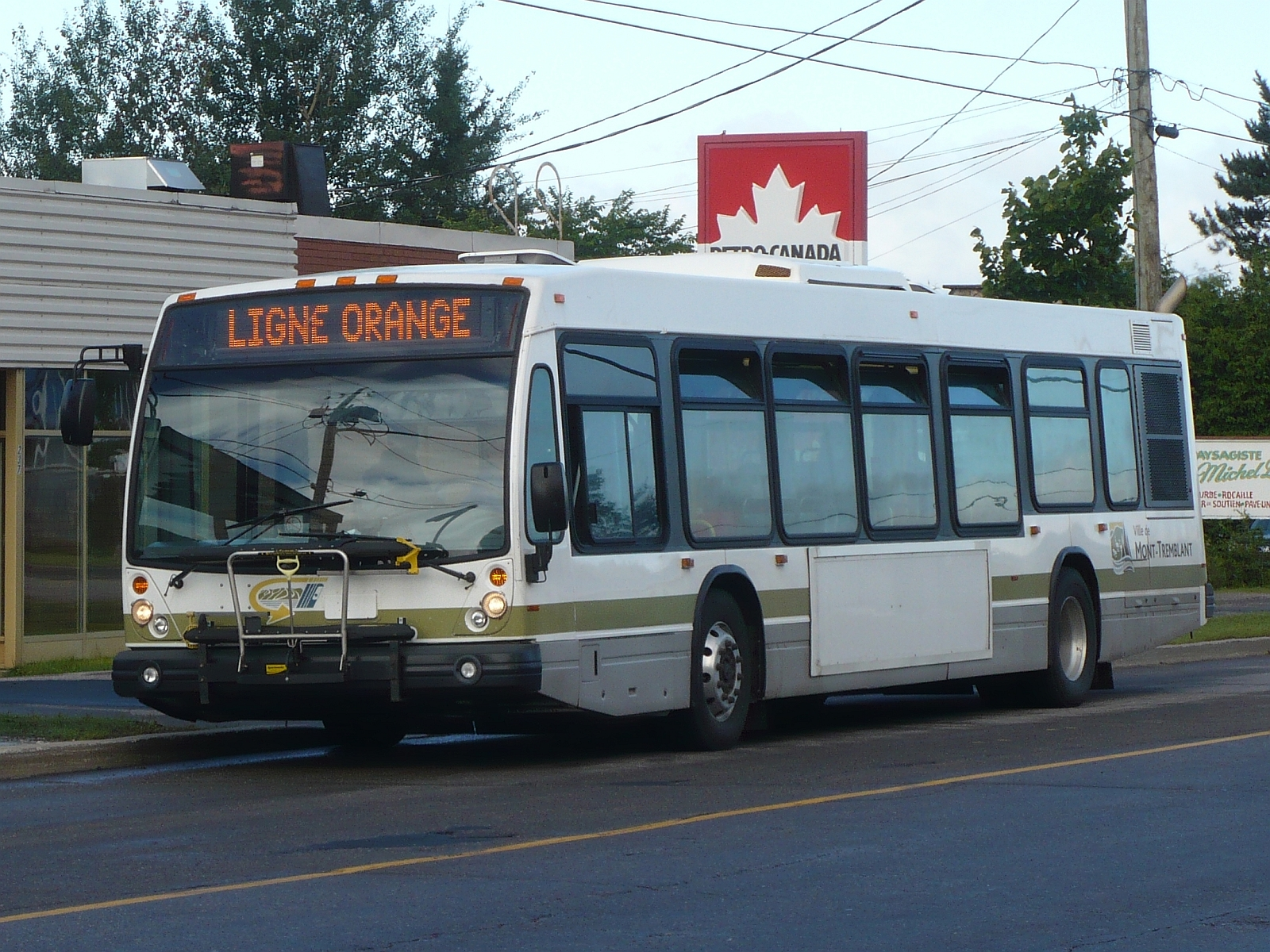
- Locale: Mont-Tremblant, Quebec
- Service area: Resort, village and downtown
- Service type: bus service
- Routes: 1
- Operator: Groupe Galland
- Website: BUS Mont-Tremblant

BUS Mont-Tremblant is a small public transit system that serves the resort town of Mont-Tremblant in the Laurentian Mountains of Quebec, Canada, approximately 130 kilometres (81 mi) north of Montreal. There is one route which travels from the resort to Mont-Tremblant Village and downtown Mont-Tremblant and back. The service is free to ride.

Other operations in Mont Tremblant include:

- Mont Tremblant Resort Shuttle - operates June to September for 7 days a week
- Parking shuttle - free service
- Mont-Tremblant National Park Shuttle
