= Exo Sud-Ouest sector =

- Parent: Exo
- Founded: 2017
- Service area: Châteauguay, Léry, Beauharnois, Kahnawake, Mercier
- Service type: bus service, paratransit, on-demand taxibus
- Routes: 18
- Destinations: Montreal
- Hubs: Terminus Châteauguay
- Annual ridership: 1,717,101 (2024)

The Exo Sud-Ouest sector is the division of Exo that delivers bus service to municipalities such as Châteauguay, Kahnawake and Beauharnois on the south shore of the St. Lawrence River in Quebec, Canada.

In October 2024, the Haut-Saint-Laurent sector was merged into the Sud-Ouest sector.

== Services ==
=== Local bus routes ===
Local routes
No.	Route	Connects to	Service times / notes
20	Beauharnois	Terminus Châteauguay	Daily
22	Châteauguay	Terminus Châteauguay	Weekdays, peak only
24	Châteauguay	Terminus Châteauguay	Weekdays, peak only
27	Châteauguay	Terminus Châteauguay	Weekdays, peak only
29	Châteauguay	Terminus Châteauguay	Weekdays, peak only
33	Châteauguay	Terminus Châteauguay	Daily
140	Mercier - Châteauguay - Mercier		Daily

=== Express / regional bus routes ===
Express / regional routes
No.	Route	Connects to	Service times / notes
1	Valleyfield - Beauharnois - Châteauguay - Montreal	Angrignon; Terminus Lafleur / Newman; Terminus Châteauguay	Daily
21	Châteauguay - Montreal	Angrignon; Terminus Lafleur / Newman; Terminus Châteauguay	Weekdays, peak only
23	Châteauguay - Montreal	Angrignon; Terminus Lafleur / Newman	Weekdays, peak only
25	Châteauguay - Montreal	Angrignon; Terminus Lafleur / Newman	Weekdays, peak only
26	Châteauguay - Montreal	Angrignon; Terminus Lafleur / Newman; Terminus Châteauguay	Peak AM service only
28	Châteauguay - Montreal (Centre-ville)	Bonaventure; Gare Centrale; Terminus Centre-ville; Terminus Châteauguay	Weekdays, peak only
31	Châteauguay - Montreal	Angrignon; Terminus Lafleur / Newman; Terminus Châteauguay	Daily
32	Châteauguay - Montreal	Angrignon; Terminus Lafleur / Newman; Terminus Châteauguay	Daily
90	Cégep André-Laurendeau	Terminus Châteauguay	Only two departures per direction, weekdays peak only
98	Kahnawake - Montreal	Angrignon; Terminus Lafleur / Newman	Weekdays only
111	Haut-Saint-Laurent	Angrignon; Bonaventure; Gare Centrale; Terminus Centre-ville; Terminus Lafleur / Newman; Terminus Châteauguay	Only weekdays peak service goes to Downtown Montreal

== See also ==
- Exo (public transit) bus services
