= Bonaventure station =

Montreal Metro station

Bonaventure
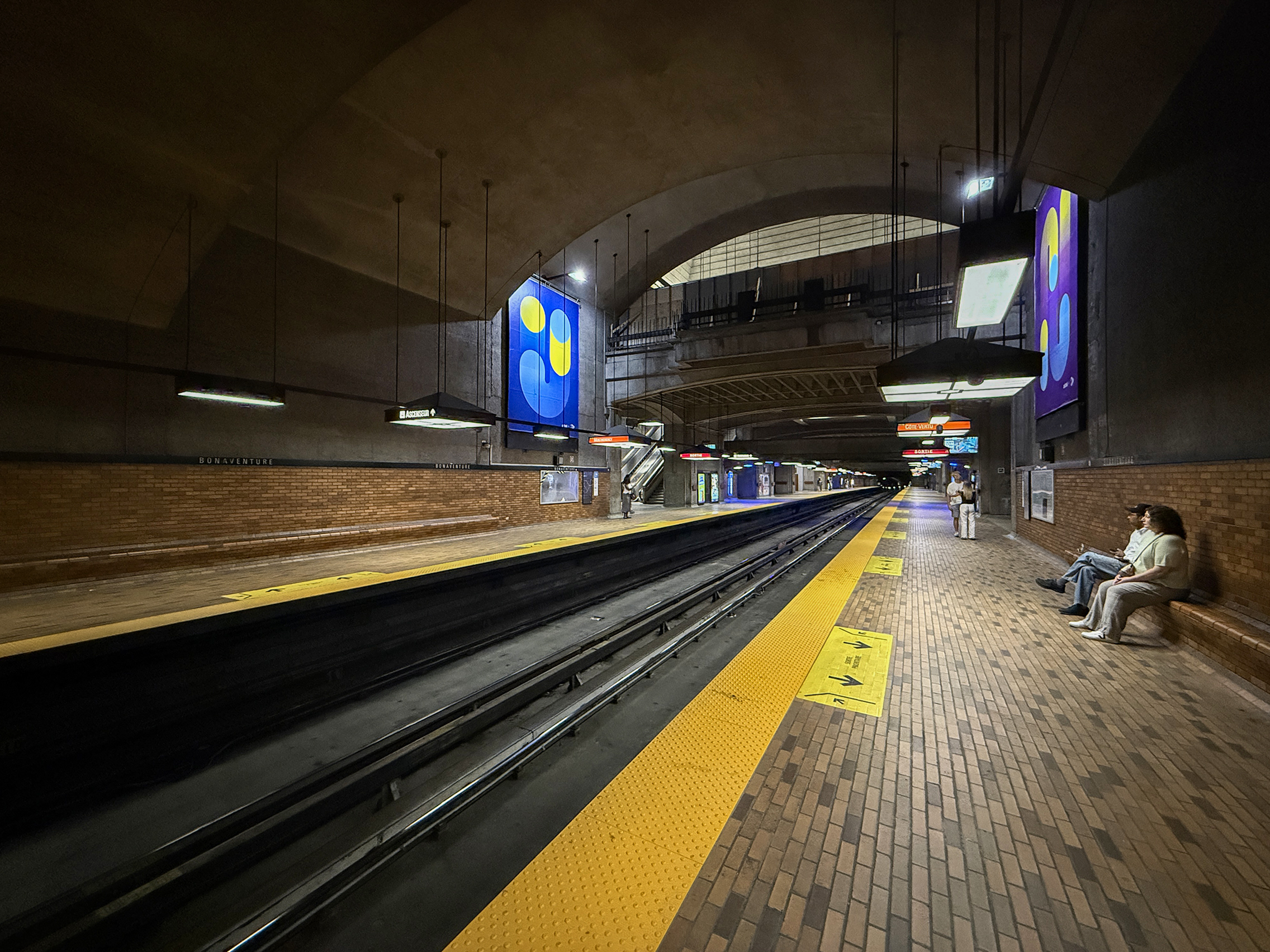
- Station platform

General information
- Location: 955 rue de la Cathédrale; Montreal, Quebec; Canada
- Coordinates: 45°29′53″N 73°34′02″W
- Operator: Société de transport de Montréal
- Platforms: 2 side platforms
- Tracks: 2
- Connections: STM bus; Terminus Centre-Ville; at Gare Centrale

Construction
- Depth: 22.6 m (74 ft 2 in), 11th deepest
- Accessible: Yes
- Architect: Victor Prus

Other information
- Fare zone: ARTM: A

History
- Opened: 13 February 1967

Passengers
- 2024: 7,033,290 ▲66.79%
- Rank: 5 of 68

Services
Preceding station	Montreal Metro	Following station
Lucien-L'Allier toward Côte-Vertu	Orange Line	Square-Victoria–OACI toward Montmorency
Location

Bonaventure station (French pronunciation: [bɔnavɑ̃tyʁ]) is a Montreal Metro station in the borough of Ville-Marie in Montreal, Quebec, Canada. It is operated by the Société de transport de Montréal (STM) and serves the Orange Line. It opened on February 13, 1967, four months after most of the initial network. It served as the western terminus of the Orange Line for 14 years until the extension to Place-Saint-Henri station opened in 1980.

== Overview ==
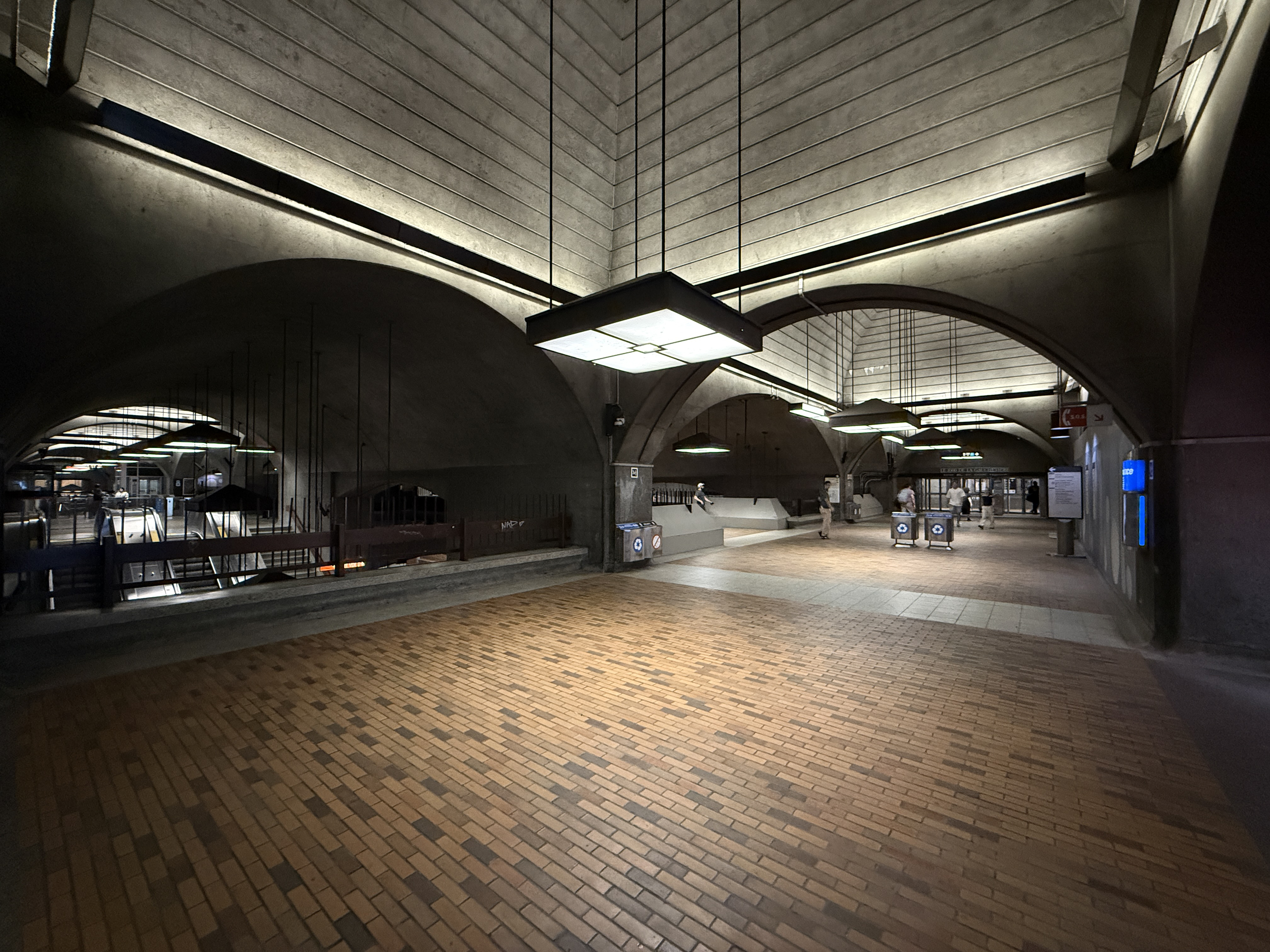
Station's concourse

Designed by Victor Prus, the station is a normal side platform station, built by cut-and-cover in order to provide a large space for the heavily trafficked mezzanine. As a key part of the underground city, the mezzanine has ticket barriers on either side to allow pedestrians to pass from one end of the station to the other side. Footbridges over the tracks below the mezzanine level allow passengers to cross from one platform to the other.

Until 1992, the station had only one outdoor entrance, in front of Windsor Station, and two additional accesses led directly to Place Bonaventure and Montreal Central Station (Gare Centrale) on one end and to the Château Champlain and Place du Canada on the other. When 1000 de La Gauchetière was built almost directly above the station, additional accesses were added to the office tower and to the Downtown Terminus (metropolitan bus terminal for Réseau de transport de Longueuil and South Shore buses) within it, as well as a street entrance on the western side of the building on Cathédrale Street and improved access to Central Station and Place Bonaventure.

The station is intermodal with the Réseau de transport métropolitain (RTM)'s commuter train lines through its underground access to Montreal Central Station, the terminus for Mascouche and Mont-Saint-Hilaire lines. Eventually, it connected to the Réseau express métropolitain network as well. There is also underground access to the Lucien-L'Allier train station and to the Lucien-L'Allier Metro station.

Elevators were added between the mezzanine and the platforms in November 2009, which made the station more accessible to people with reduced mobility. However, no step-free access to the surface was possible until 2019, when elevators were added connecting the mezzanine level to Terminus Centre-Ville and to the lobby of 1000 De La Gauchetière. This was criticised in the media. The elevators do not allow passengers to change platforms unless they exit the ticket barriers. Another elevator connecting the station to Place du Canada and the Château Champlain was once the only elevator in the system; it is separated from the mezzanine level by steps.

The station is equipped with the MétroVision information screens, which display news, commercials, and the time until the next train.

== Origin of the name ==
This station is named after Place Bonaventure, a major commercial complex containing businesses, the Hôtel Bonaventure (formerly a Hilton Hotel), and the Société de transport de Montréal's headquarters. This was named after Bonaventure Station, a former station on the Grand Trunk Railway, which in turn was named for its location on Saint Bonaventure Street, now Saint Jacques Street. All derive their name from St. Bonaventure, a 13th-century Italian philosopher and mystic.

== Connecting bus routes ==
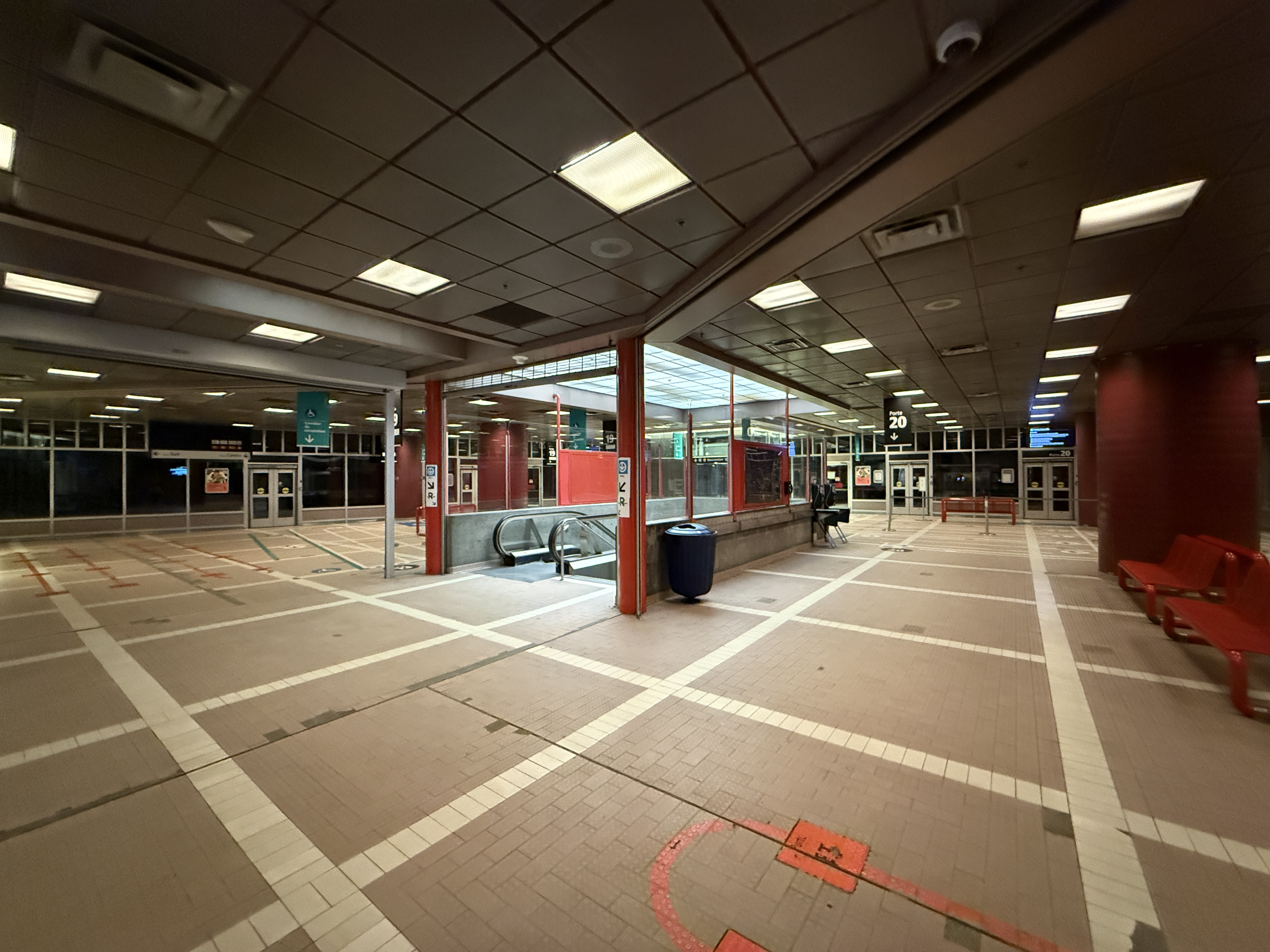
The Terminus Centre-Ville

All STM bus routes are located on nearby street stops, while other operators use the Terminus Centre-ville which is connected to the Metro station via underground link.

Société de transport de Montréal
No.	Route	Connects to	Service times / notes
61	Wellington	De L'Église; LaSalle; Charlevoix	Daily Some rush hour services start and end at Charlevoix metro
74	Bridge		Daily
150	René-Lévesque	Atwater; Gare Centrale; Terminus Centre-ville; Lucien-L'Allier; Papineau	Daily
350 ☾	Verdun / LaSalle	Frontenac; Gare Centrale; Terminus Centre-ville; Lucien-L'Allier; Atwater; Lionel-Groulx; LaSalle; De L'Église; Verdun; Jolicoeur; Monk	Night service
355 ☾	Pie-IX	Saint-Michel-Montréal-Nord; Pie-IX; Frontenac; Gare Centrale; Terminus Centre-ville; Lucien-L'Allier; Atwater	Night service
358 ☾	René-Lévesque	Frontenac; Papineau; Gare Centrale; Terminus Centre-ville; Lucien-L'Allier; Atwater	Night service
364 ☾	Sherbrooke / Joseph-Renaud	Honoré-Beaugrand; Radisson; Langelier; Cadillac; Frontenac; Gare Centrale; Terminus Centre-ville; Lucien-L'Allier; Atwater	Night service
410	Express Notre-Dame	Gare Centrale; Terminus Centre-ville; Lucien-L'Allier	Weekdays, peak only
420	Express Notre-Dame-de-Grâce	Peel; McGill; Lucien-L'Allier; Gare Centrale; Terminus Centre-ville	Weekdays only
430	Express Pointe-aux-Trembles	Pointe-aux-Trembles; Sherbrooke East Park and Ride; Gare Centrale; Terminus Centre-ville; Lucien-L'Allier	Weekdays only
445	Express Papineau	Papineau; Gare Centrale; Terminus Centre-ville	Weekdays, peak only
480	Express Du Parc	Parc; Place-des-Arts; Gare Centrale; Terminus Centre-ville; Lucien-L'Allier	Weekdays, peak only
747 ✈	YUL Airport / Downtown	Gare d'autocars de Montréal; Berri-UQAM; Gare Centrale; Terminus Centre-ville; Lucien-L'Allier; Lionel-Groulx	Daily Some runs start or end at Lionel-Groulx Metro Station
777	Station Jean-Drapeau / Casino / Bonaventure	Jean-Drapeau	Daily
Other connecting bus routes

== Nearby points of interest ==
=== Connected via the underground city ===
- Terminus Centre-Ville
- 1000 de La Gauchetière
- Place Ville Marie
- Place Bonaventure
- Place du Canada – Hôtel Château Champlain
- Central Station – Via Rail, Amtrak and AMT
- Canadian National Railway headquarters
- Queen Elizabeth Hotel
- STM headquarters (in Place Bonaventure)
- Le 1250 René-Lévesque Ouest
- Édifice Gare Windsor –
  former Canadian Pacific Railway headquarters
- Bell Centre
- Lucien-L'Allier train station
  and Lucien-L'Allier Metro station and points west
- Square-Victoria-OACI Metro station and points east
- McGill Metro station and points north

=== Other ===
- Mary, Queen of the World Cathedral
- The Dow Planetarium, now closed for relocation
- Sun Life Building
- Centre Sheraton
- Tour CIBC
- Place du Canada
- Dorchester Square

== See also ==
- Line 3 Red
- Réseau express métropolitain
