= Pomerleau =

Pomerleau is a surname. Notable people with the surname include:

- Donald Pomerleau (1915–1992), American police chief
- Kimberly Pomerleau, American politician
- Ovide F. Pomerleau (born 1940), American psychologist
- René Pomerleau (1904–1993), Canadian mycologist and plant pathologist
- Roger Pomerleau (born 1947), Canadian politician
