= Terminus Centre-Ville =

Bus terminus in Quebec, Canada

Coordinates: 45°29′53″N 73°33′58″W

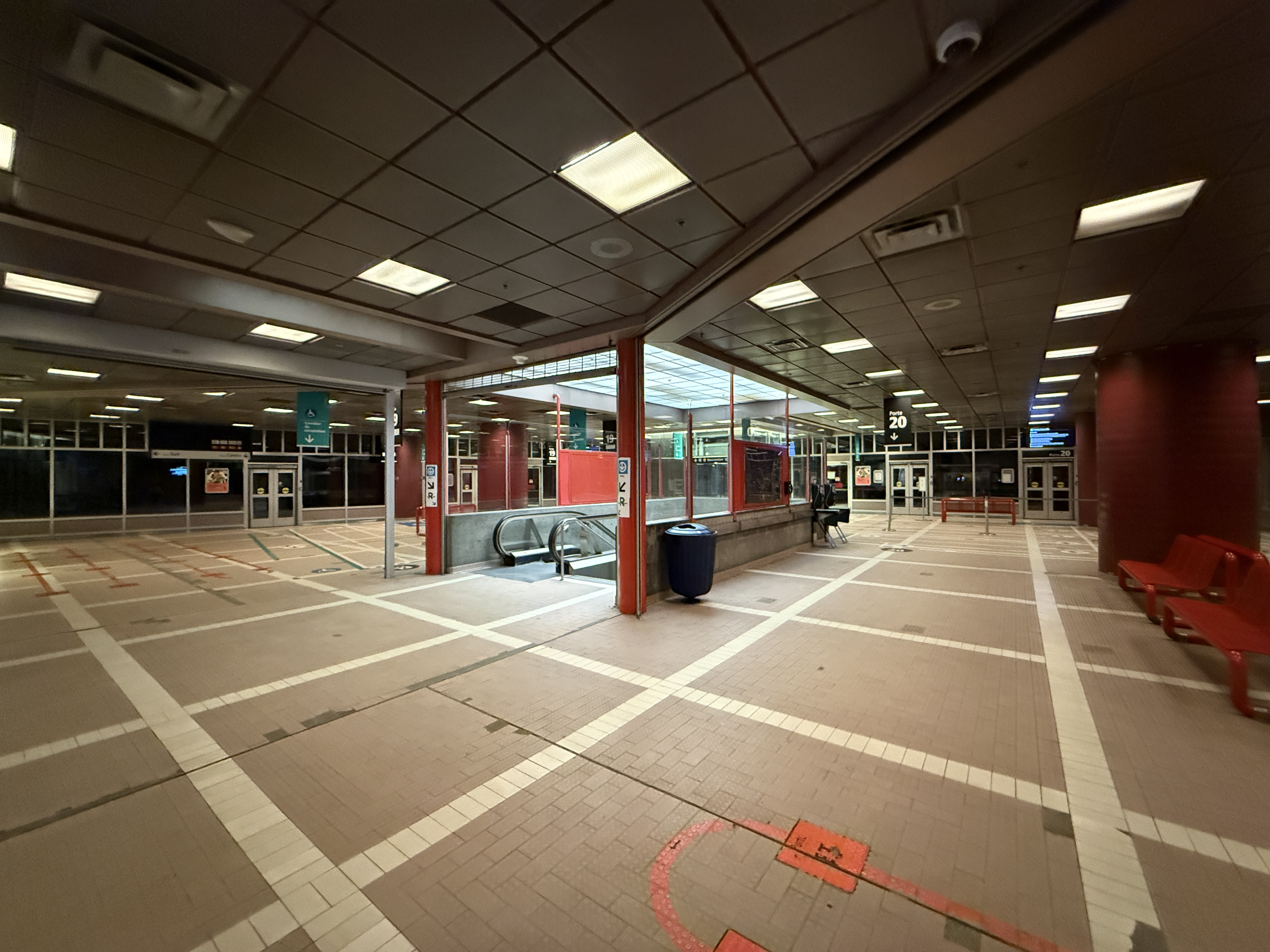
- Terminus Centre-Ville interior

General information
- Location: 1000 Rue De La Gauchetière Ouest; Montreal, Quebec; Canada
- Owner: ARTM
- Bus stands: 21
- Bus operators: Exo bus services; Réseau de transport de Longueuil
- Connections: Bonaventure; Gare Centrale

Construction
- Cycle facilities: Forbidden
- Accessible: Yes

Other information
- Fare zone: ARTM: A

Passengers
- 2016: 12,420,500
Location

Terminus Centre-Ville (TCV; lit. 'City Centre Terminus') is an ARTM bus terminus located within 1000 de La Gauchetière in Montreal, Quebec, Canada. It is multimodal with the Bonaventure Metro station and Lucien-L'Allier Metro station on the Orange Line, and the Central Station in the city's downtown core. The terminus has 21 gates in three platforms: North, Centre and South.

== History ==
Buses lines from the South Shore would start and end at De La Gauchetière Street in front of Place Bonaventure since at least 1974. Studies in the 1980’s recommended a more permanent terminus in the same area, while the Montreal Urban Community preferred that buses from Champlain Bridge stop at LaSalle metro station. Finally, in November 1985, the Société de transport de la rive-sud de Montréal (SRTSM) inaugurated an open-air bus terminal using an old parking lot, on the same block where today’s terminus stands.

In March 1989 the terminus was moved down temporarily to the block between St-Antoine and Viger, Busby and University streets, to allow construction of 1000 De La Gauchetière and the new terminus beneath it. The current terminus was inaugurated on May 12, 1992, with STRSM and CIT bus lines all moved by June.

Certain bus stops were moved to neighbouring streets in August 2009 due to lack of capacity within the terminus. In 2014, as projects for rebuilding the Turcot Interchange and Champlain Bridge loomed, government agencies identified the need to increase bus capacity downtown. To accommodate more buses than what the Terminus Centre-Ville could handle, the Agence métropolitain de transport opened a temporary outdoor bus terminal with 6 platforms one block south-east of TCV, Terminus Mansfield, on November 18, 2016.

After the Réseau express métropolitain (REM) started service on July 31, 2023, a non-compete clause meant most Réseau de transport de Longueuil and Exo bus services to the South Shore were rerouted to Panama and Brossard stations. Terminus Mansfield was closed and remaining bus lines were moved back into TCV. Today, only a few bus lines still serve the facility.

In September 2024, the City of Saint-Jean-sur-Richelieu announced that its intercity routes would be redirected to Panama or Brossard stations upon the opening of the second phase of REM network at the end of 2025, citing cost savings and reduced travel times compared to a downtown Montreal terminus. Concerns regarding the REM’s reliability in winter conditions led to the postponement of the change until 30 April 2026.

As service dwindled, Exo announced that the north platform and its gates would be closed as of August 18, 2025.

== Station layout ==
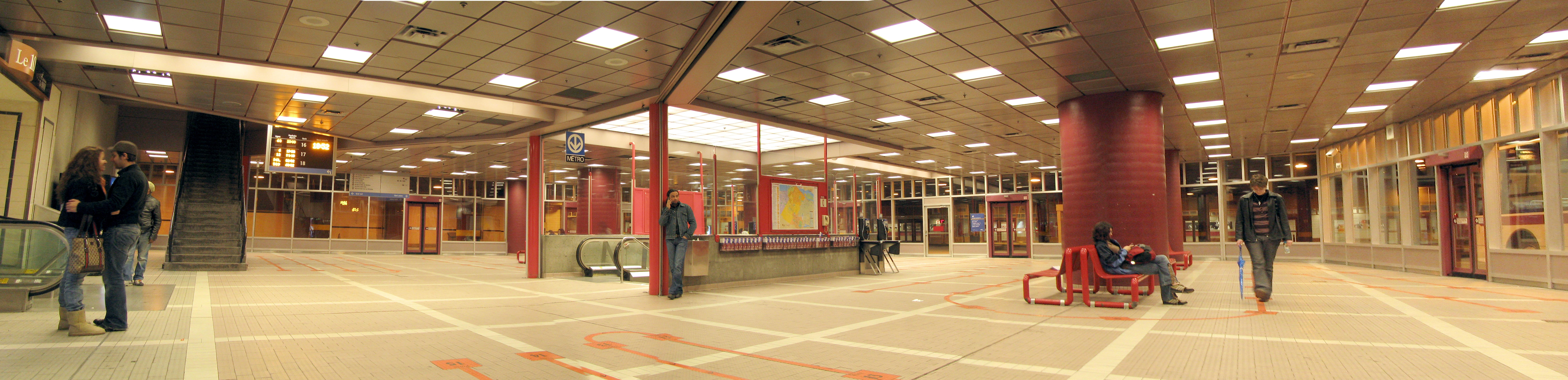
Panoramic view of the Terminus Centre-ville's centre platform, prior to recent renovations. At the center is the staircase to the Bonaventure Metro station.
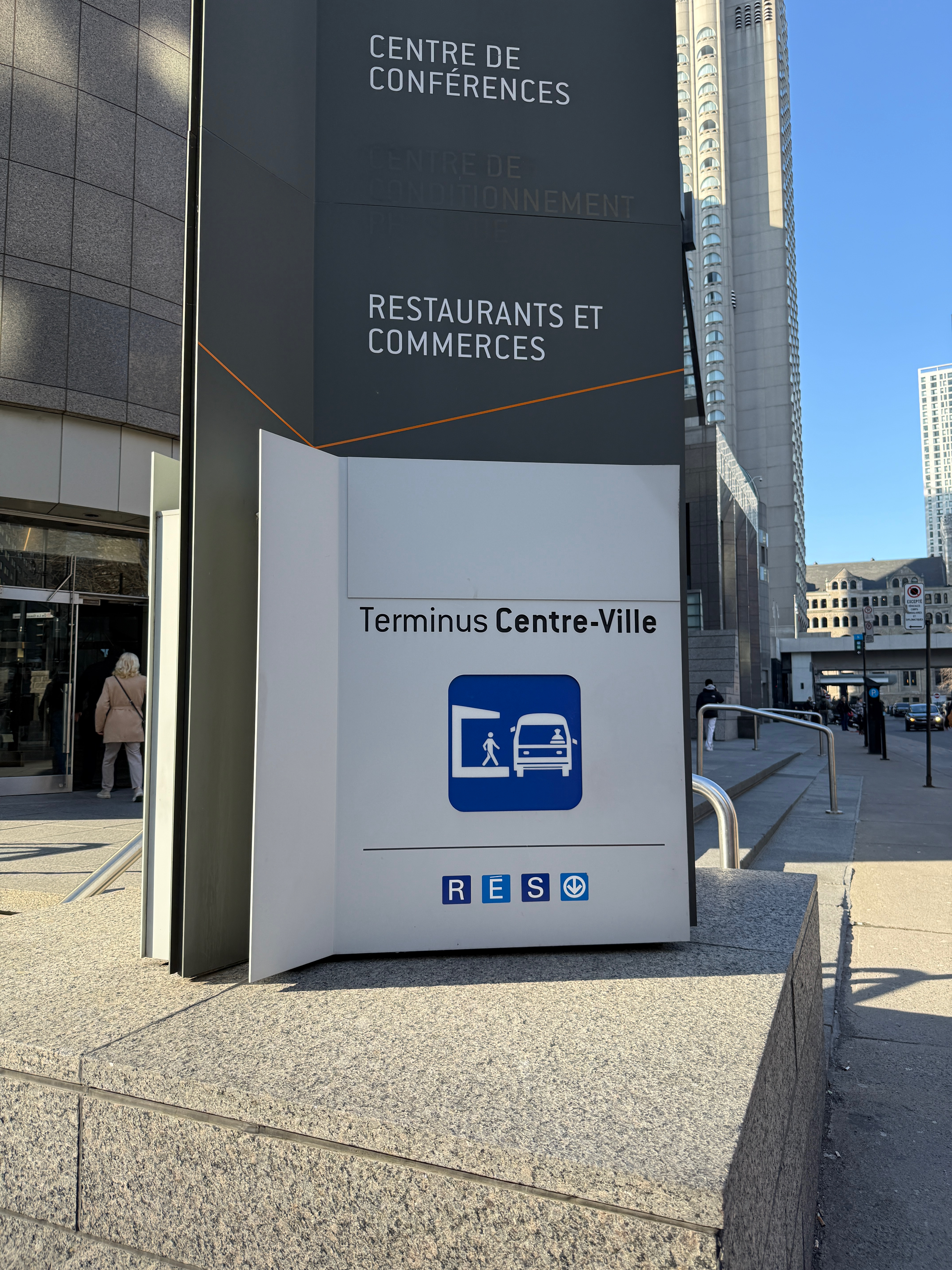
Sign for the terminus outside of the entrance to 1000 De La Gauchetière

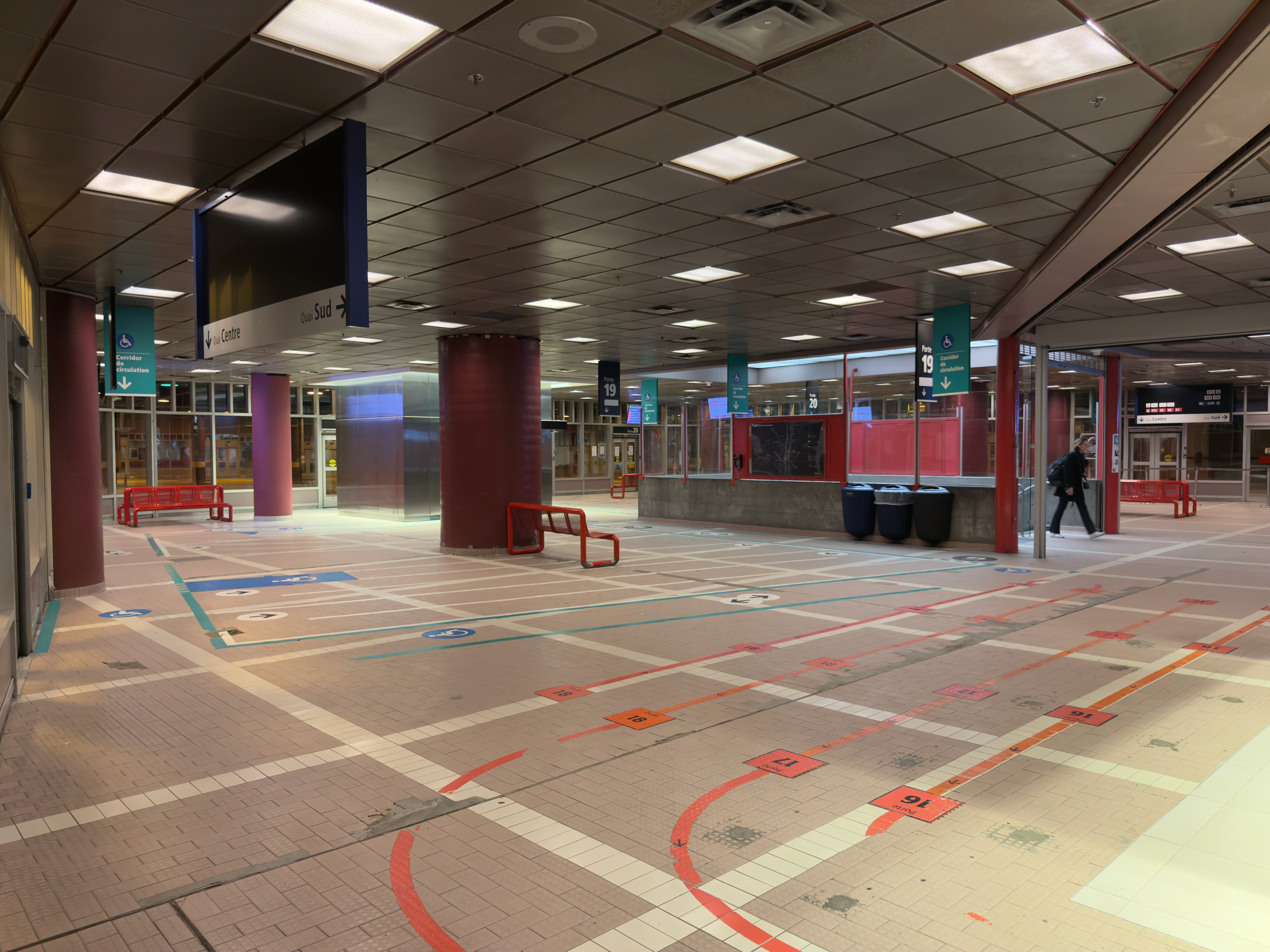
Centre platform with markings for queues to gates

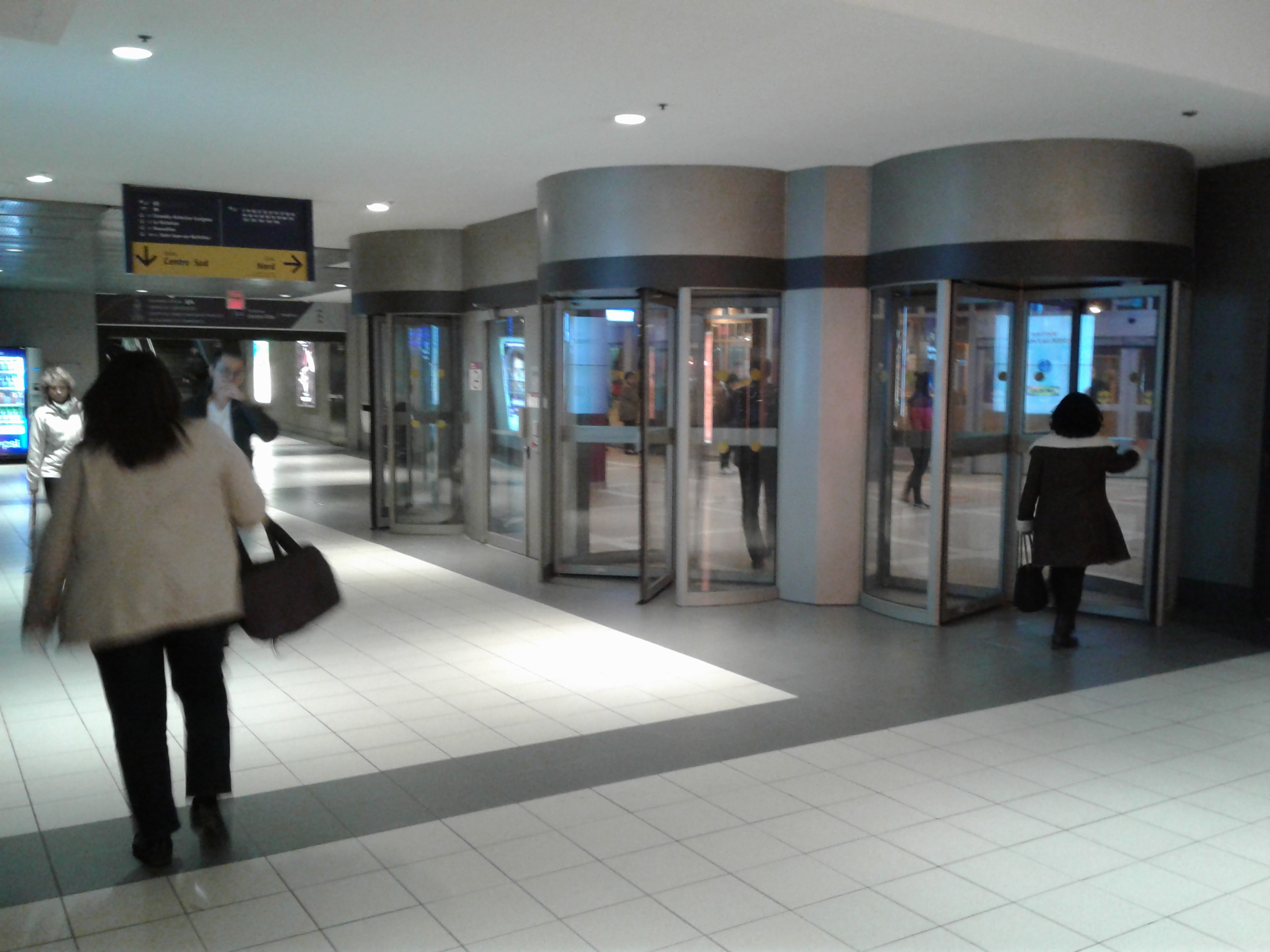
Entrance to the North platform from the underground passageway

The terminus splits its gates, or doors, (portes) into three platforms (quais):

- North, with 12 gates (1 to 12), closed since August 2025
- South, with 6 gates (13 to 18)
- Centre, with 3 gates (19 to 21)

Markings on the floor help passengers line up to the correct gate.

South and Centre platforms are connected, with escalators, elevators and large waiting areas in the Centre platform. The Centre platform has escalators and elevators up to the ground floor of 1000 De La Gauchetière and down to Bonaventure metro station; the North platform had escalators and elevators up to the ground floor and is connected to the Underground City passages between Bonaventure station and Place Bonaventure.

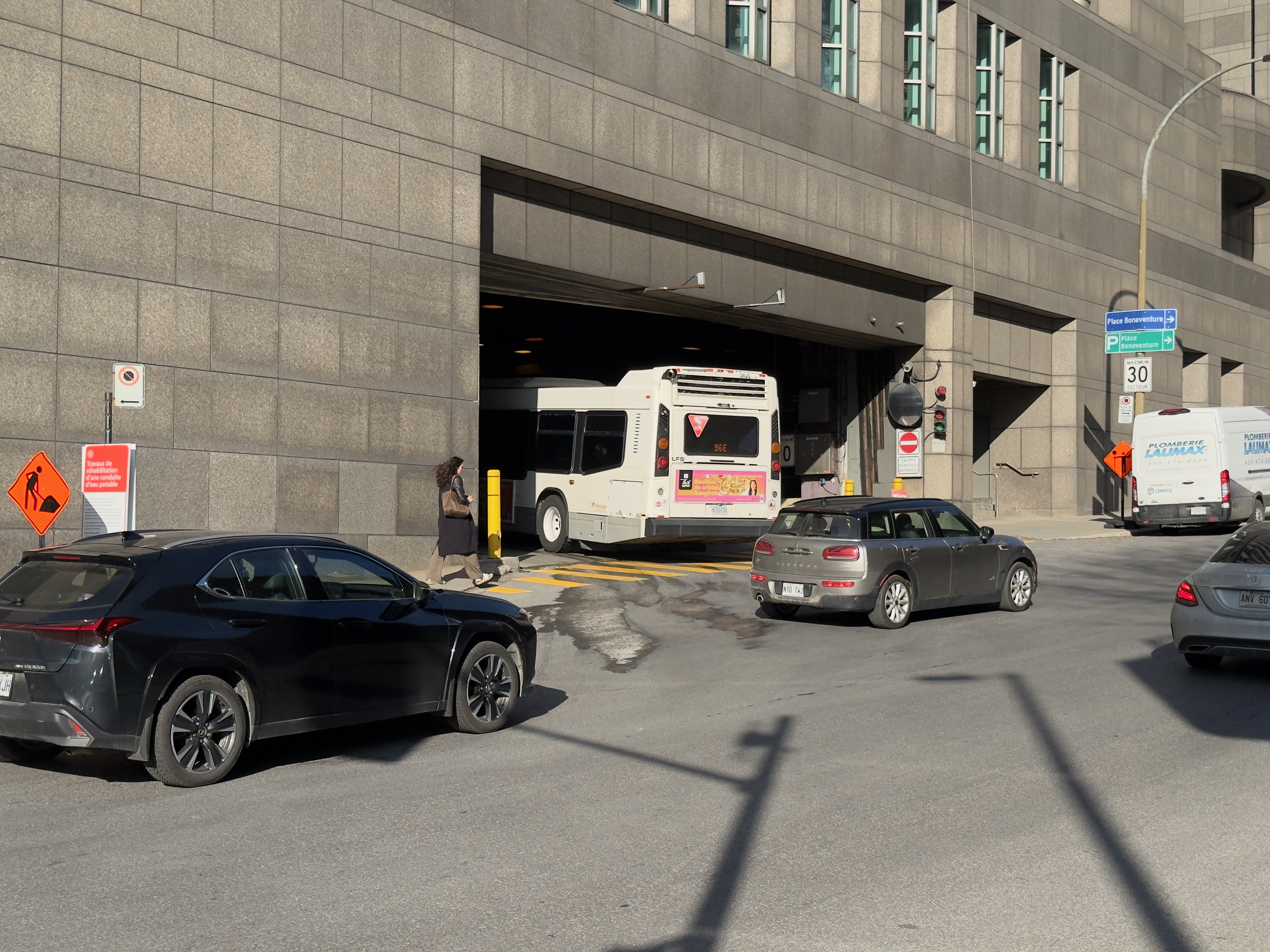
A bus enters the terminus from Mansfield Street

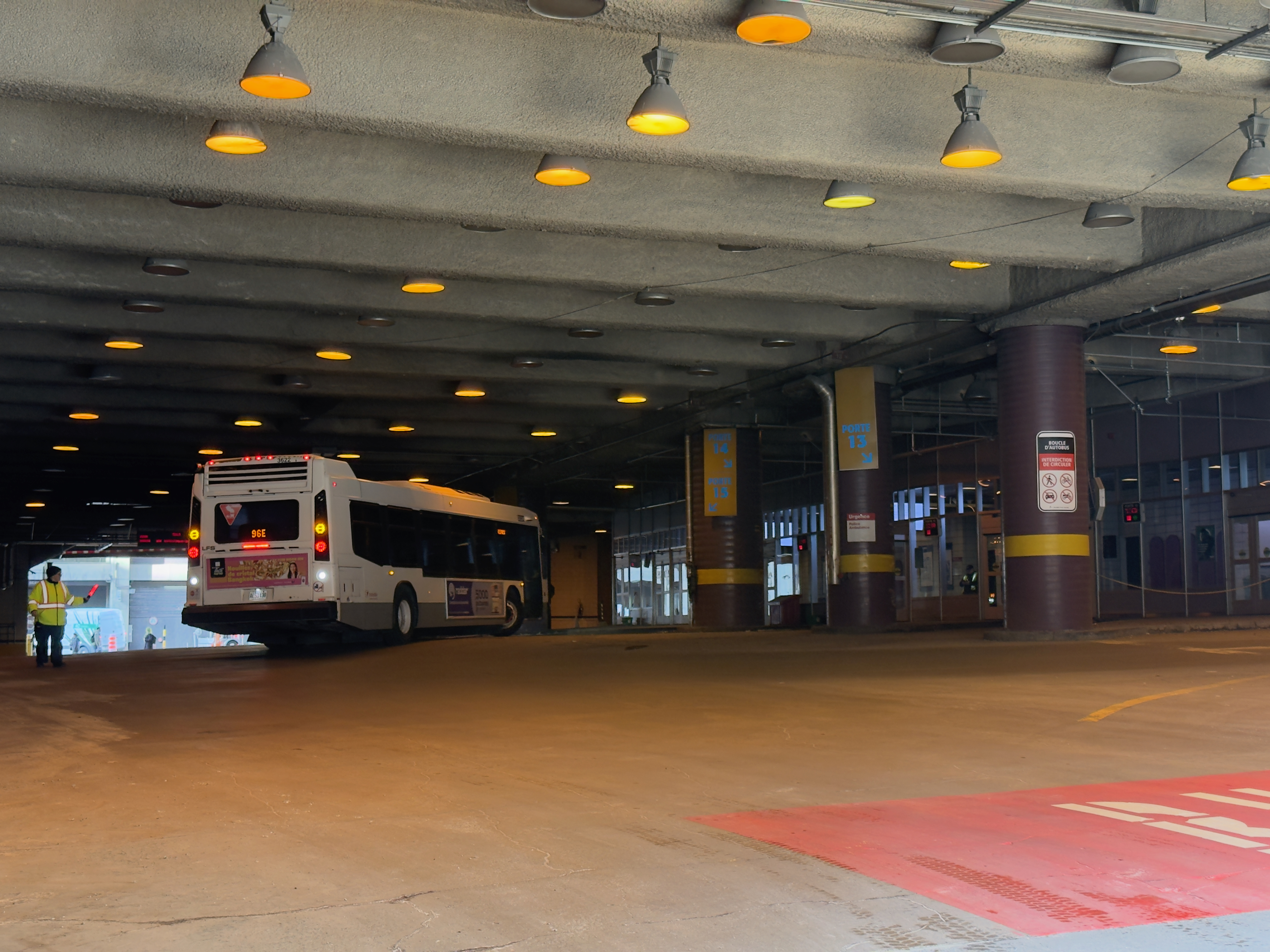
Banksman helps a bus pull out of gate 16

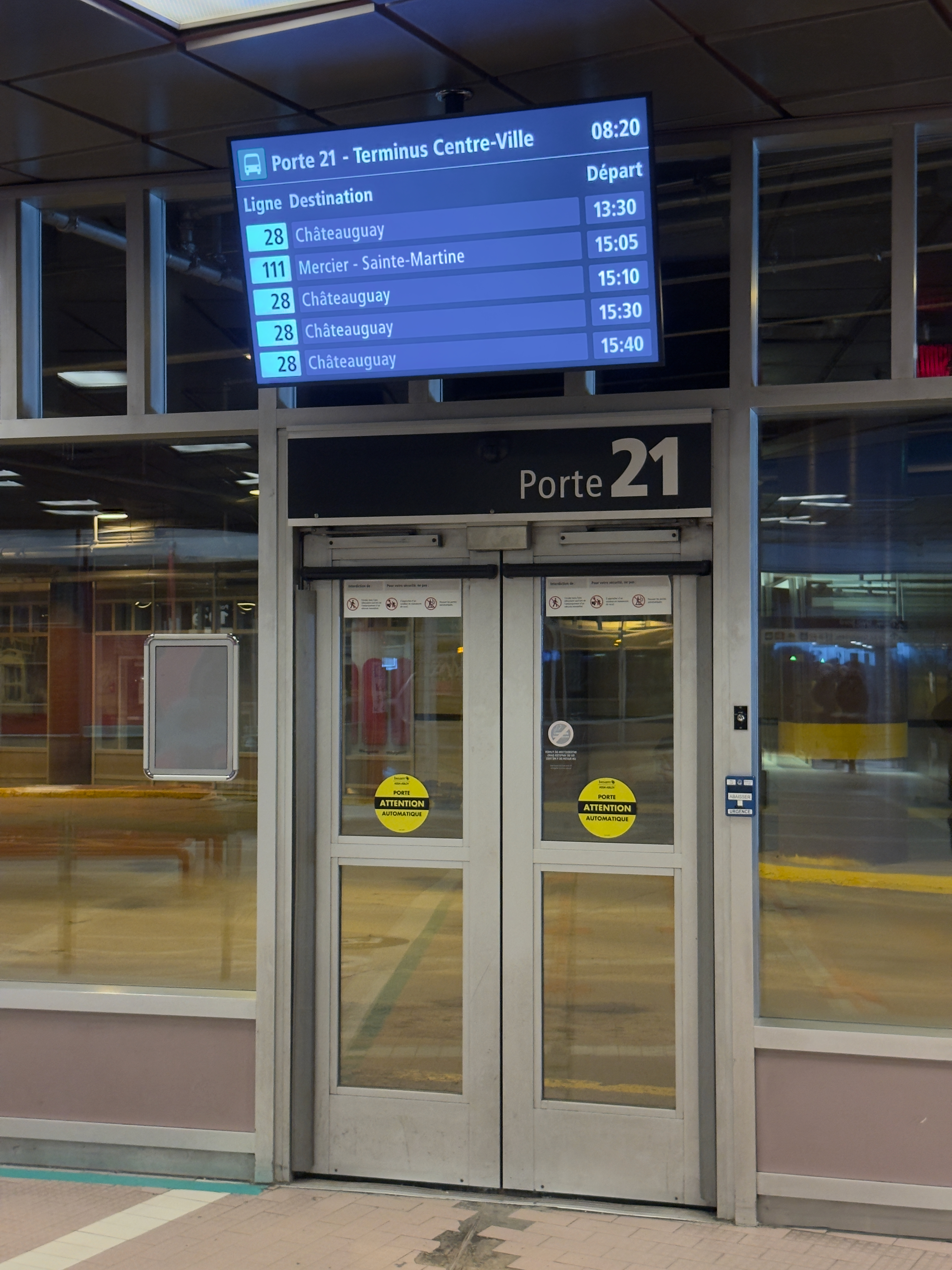
Gate 21 on the Centre platform

Passengers enter the terminus from either Bonaventure station and the ground floor of 1000 De La Gauchetière. Buses enter through a large bay door on Mansfield Street and exit through de la Cathédrale Street, and two-way indoor lanes around the South and Centre platforms for buses to access the gates. Banksmen help bus drivers avoid collisions while pulling out of South and North gates; buses pull up alongside gates in the Centre platform.

Passengers are not allowed to enter through the bay doors or cross the bus lanes. Automatic doors at the gates prevent passengers from leaving the platforms without a bus present.

== Connecting bus routes ==
Réseau de transport de Longueuil
No.	Route	Connects to	Service times / notes	Platform and gate
5	Auteuil / mntée Saint-Hubert / Maisonneuve	Saint-Lambert	Weekdays, early morning only (before REM service)	Centre 19
55	Victoria / Wellington via the Victoria Bridge	Saint-Lambert	Weekdays, peak only	Centre 19
86	Samuel-de-Champlain / de Montarville / TCV		Weekdays, peak only	Centre 20
287	Samuel-De Champlain / de Montarville / TCV		Two AM departures towards Montreal only	
Exo Sud-Ouest sector
No.	Route	Connects to	Services times / notes	Platform and gate
28	Châteauguay - Montreal (Centre-ville)	Terminus Châteauguay	Weekdays, peak only	Centre 21
111	Haut-Saint-Laurent	Terminus Châteauguay	Weekdays, peak only goes to TCV, other services stop at Angrignon	Centre 21
