= Mont-Tremblant =

- City
- Mont-Tremblant in 2026
- Motto(s): Notre culture, c'est la nature
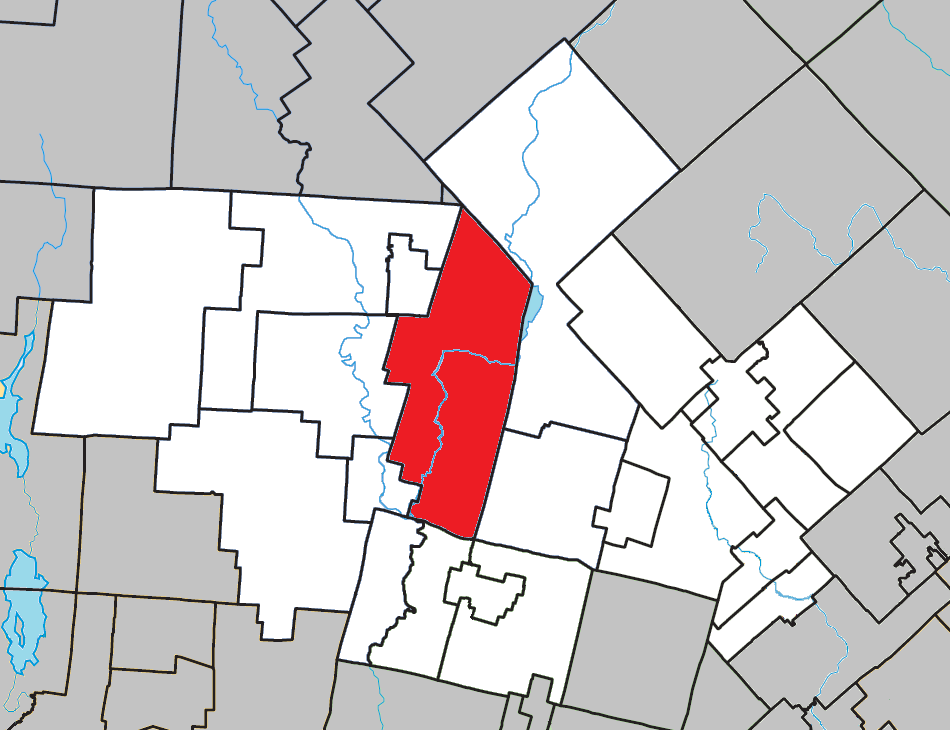
- Location within Les Laurentides RCM

- Location in central Quebec
- Coordinates: 46°07′N 74°36′W
- Country: Canada
- Province: Quebec
- Region: Laurentides
- RCM: Les Laurentides
- Constituted: November 22, 2000

Government
  - Mayor: Pascal De Bellefeuille
  - Federal riding: Laurentides—Labelle
  - Prov. riding: Labelle

Area
  - Total: 248.10 km^{2} (95.79 sq mi)
  - Land: 233.75 km^{2} (90.25 sq mi)

Population (2021)
  - Total: 10,992
  - Density: 47/km^{2} (120/sq mi)
  - Pop 2016-2021: ▲14%
  - Dwellings: 8,783
- Time zone: UTC−5 (EST)
  - Summer (DST): UTC−4 (EDT)
- Postal code(s): J8E
- Area code: 819
- Highways: R-117 (TCH); R-323; R-327
- Website: www.villede mont-tremblant.qc.ca

Mont-Tremblant (French pronunciation: [mɔ̃ tʁɑ̃blɑ̃]) is a city in the Laurentian Mountains of Quebec, Canada, approximately 130 kilometres (81 mi) northwest of Montreal and 140 kilometres (87 mi) northeast of Ottawa, Ontario. The current municipality with city status was formed in 2000. Mont-Tremblant is most famous for its ski resort, the Mont-Tremblant Ski Resort, which is seven kilometres from the village proper, at the foot of a mountain called Mont Tremblant (derived from local Algonquins who referred to it as the "trembling mountain").

Mont-Tremblant has a race track called Circuit Mont-Tremblant. It has hosted or currently hosts Formula One, Can-Am, Trans-Am, and Champ Car World Series competitions and Ironman triathlon, Quebec.

The surrounding area also features hiking, cycling, canoeing, fishing, golfing, ziplines, tennis, running, go-karting, and a host of other outdoor activities.

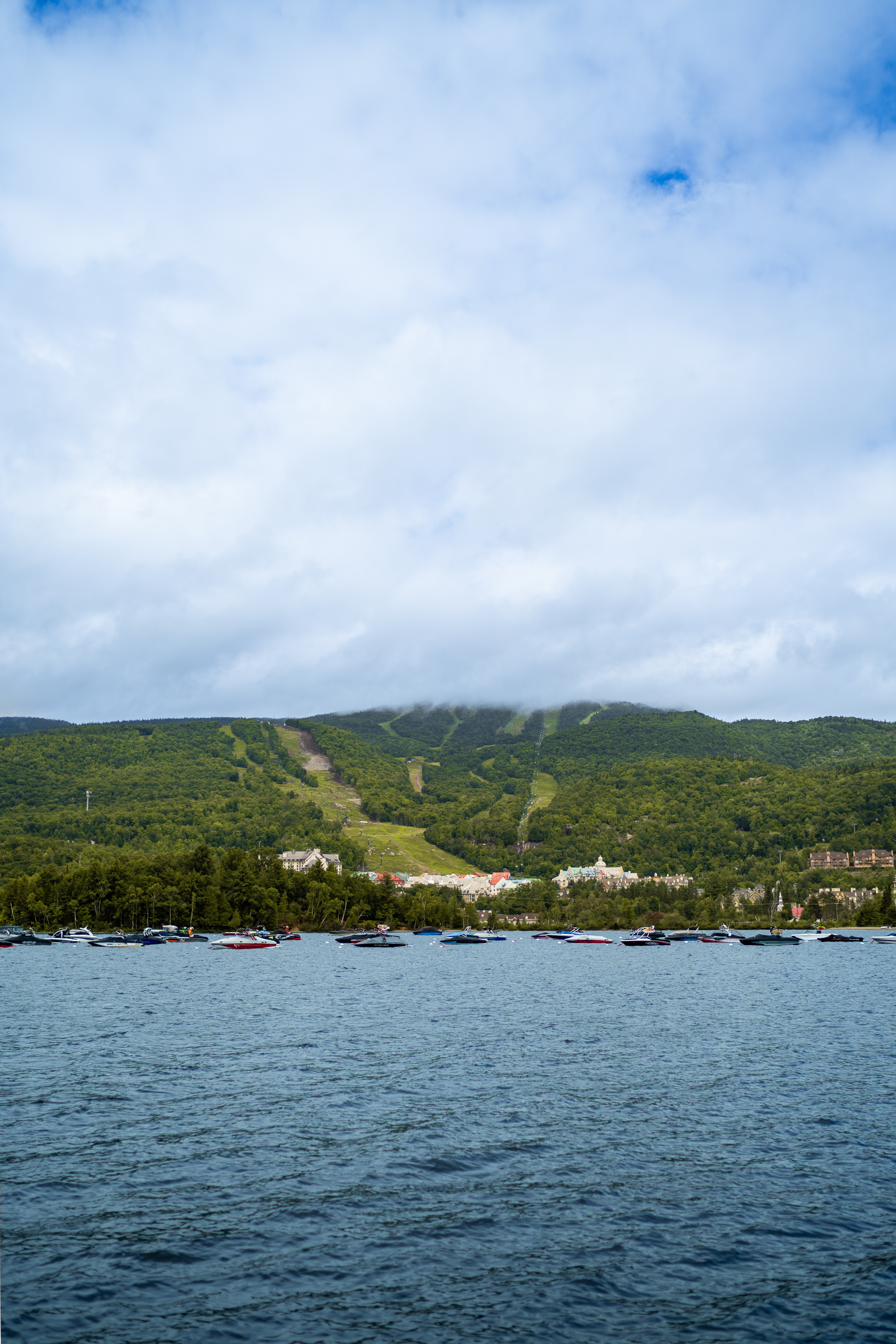
View from the pier.

== History ==
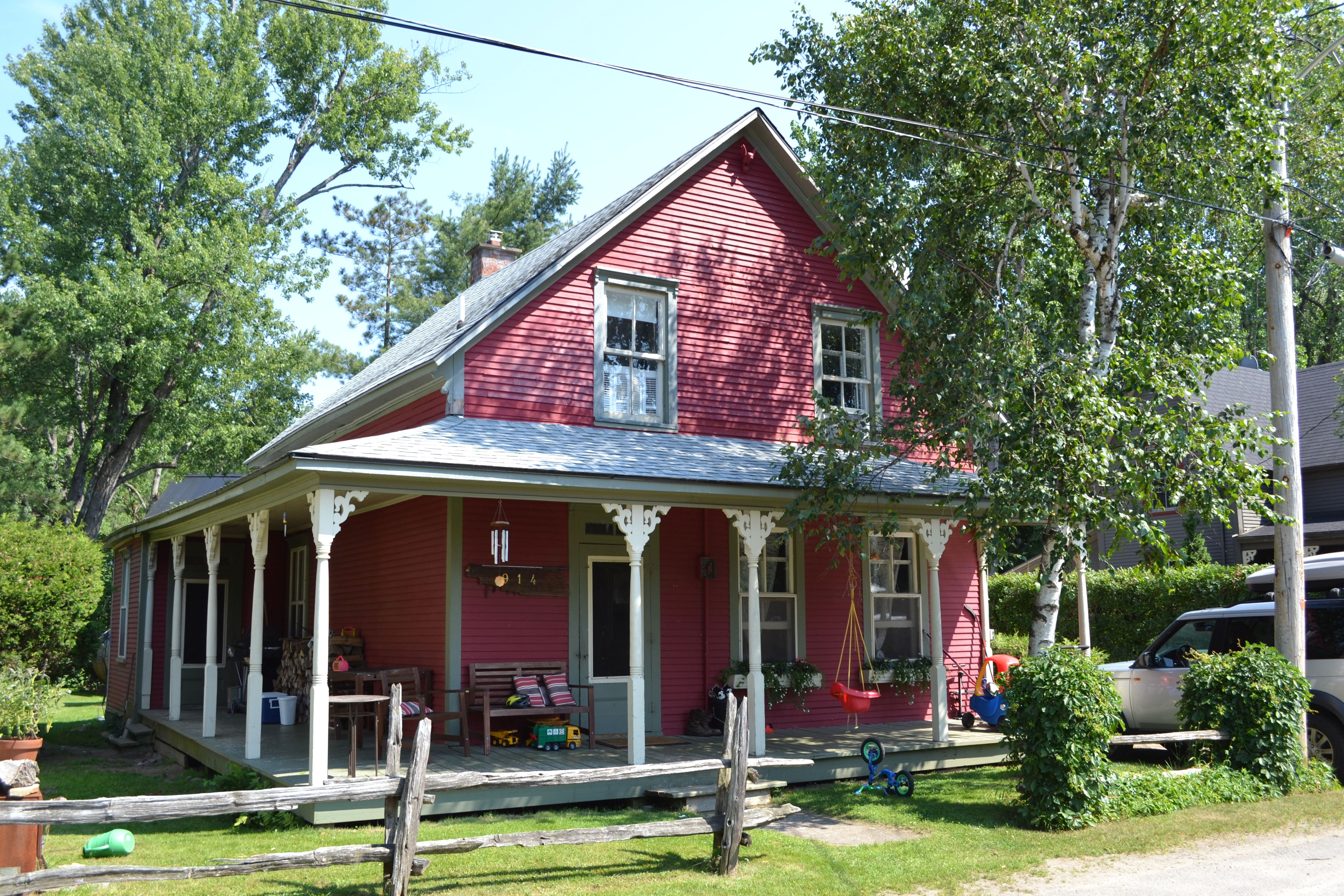
House in the historic Mont-Tremblant village

The area was inhabited by Algonquins before European colonization. It was settled in 1872 by parish priest Antoine Labelle, leading to formal establishment of the parish in 1879. A railway line from Montreal was completed to the village of Saint-Jovite in 1892, and extended to Lac Mercier in 1904. Mont-Tremblant developed around the Lac-Mercier station. In 1905 a hydroelectric dam was erected on the banks of the Ruisseau Clair (Clear River) and the Rivière-du-Diable (Devil's River) providing electricity initially for Saint-Jovite. Principal economic activities were agriculture and logging.

Constructed by Joseph Bondurant Ryan, the ski resort Mont-Tremblant Lodge began operation of their first chair lift in 1939. His family sold the resort in 1965 to a consortium of investors.

In 2002 the four municipalities in the area merged, Ville Saint-Jovite, Paroisse de Saint-Jovite, Mont-Tremblant, and Lac-Tremblant-Nord, becoming the amalgamated Ville de Mont-Tremblant. Afterwards the Municipality of Lac-Tremblant-Nord separated, effective 2006.

== Geography ==
The city is dominated by Mont Tremblant with an altitude of 968m which is one of the highest peaks in southern Quebec.

Climate data for Saint Jovite
Month	Jan	Feb	Mar	Apr	May	Jun	Jul	Aug	Sep	Oct	Nov	Dec	Year
Record high humidex	13.5	11.7	27.9	32.7	39.7	44.4	44.5	45.7	40.3	32.1	22.1	16.6	45.7
Record high °C (°F)	12.4 (54.3)	11.8 (53.2)	27.1 (80.8)	29.5 (85.1)	35.7 (96.3)	33.4 (92.1)	35.6 (96.1)	33.9 (93.0)	35.7 (96.3)	26.9 (80.4)	20.7 (69.3)	16.2 (61.2)	35.7 (96.3)
Mean daily maximum °C (°F)	−5.5 (22.1)	−3.3 (26.1)	2.6 (36.7)	10.3 (50.5)	18.5 (65.3)	23.0 (73.4)	25.3 (77.5)	24.5 (76.1)	20.1 (68.2)	12.3 (54.1)	4.6 (40.3)	−2.5 (27.5)	10.8 (51.4)
Daily mean °C (°F)	−11.9 (10.6)	−10.6 (12.9)	−4.4 (24.1)	3.5 (38.3)	11.0 (51.8)	15.7 (60.3)	18.2 (64.8)	17.2 (63.0)	12.9 (55.2)	6.4 (43.5)	−0.2 (31.6)	−7.7 (18.1)	4.2 (39.6)
Mean daily minimum °C (°F)	−18.3 (−0.9)	−17.9 (−0.2)	−11.3 (11.7)	−3.2 (26.2)	3.3 (37.9)	8.5 (47.3)	10.9 (51.6)	9.8 (49.6)	5.6 (42.1)	0.5 (32.9)	−5.1 (22.8)	−12.9 (8.8)	−2.5 (27.5)
Record low °C (°F)	−41.4 (−42.5)	−38.8 (−37.8)	−38.3 (−36.9)	−19.4 (−2.9)	−6.9 (19.6)	−2.1 (28.2)	1.2 (34.2)	0.1 (32.2)	−6.7 (19.9)	−12.0 (10.4)	−28.0 (−18.4)	−34.9 (−30.8)	−41.4 (−42.5)
Record low wind chill	−42.8	−41.7	−38.5	−36.3	−7.9	−2.0	0.0	0.0	−7.3	−11.8	−25.5	−36.5	−42.8

== Demographics ==
In the 2021 Census of Population conducted by Statistics Canada, Mont-Tremblant had a population of 10,992 living in 5,408 of its 8,783 total private dwellings, a change of 14% from its 2016 population of 9,646. With a land area of 233.75 km^{2} (90.25 sq mi), it had a population density of 47.0/km^{2} (121.8/sq mi) in 2021.

Population:

- Population in 2021: 10,992
- Population in 2016: 9,646
- Population in 2011: 9,494
- Population in 2006: 8,892
- Population in 2001: 8,317

Language:

- French as first language: 86.9%
- English as first language: 8%
- Other as first language: 2.8%

== Education ==
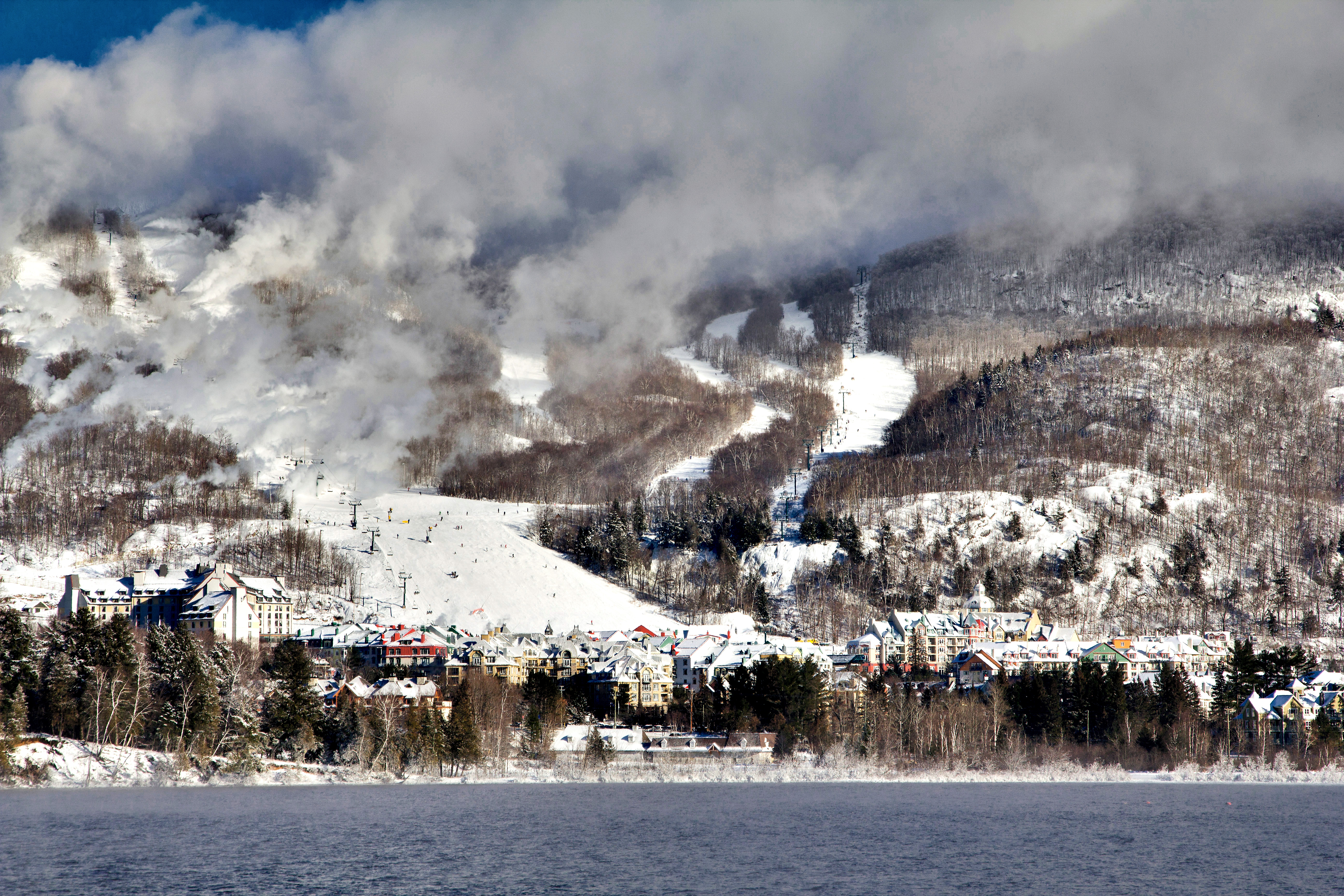
Mont-Tremblant, December 2011

The city has five elementary schools on its territory, one high school, one professional training school, and one public college.

The Commission scolaire des Laurentides operates French-language schools:

- Elementary schools: Fleur-Soleil, L'Odyssée, La Ribambelle, Tournesol, Trois Saisons.
- High school: École Polyvalente Curé-Mercure.

The Sir Wilfrid Laurier School Board operates English-language schools:

- Saint Agathe Academy in Sainte-Agathe-des-Monts serves students for both elementary and secondary levels.
- Arundel Elementary School in Arundel also serves students at the elementary level

Professional training school: Centre Le Florès.

CEGEP: Centre Collégial de Mont-Tremblant (also called CEGEP de Saint-Jerome Mont-Tremblant campus).

== See also ==
- Gray Rocks
- List of anglophone communities in Quebec
- Mont-Tremblant public transit
- Mont Blanc, Quebec
