= List of Montreal Metro stations =

The Montreal Metro consists of 68 stations on four lines and is operated by the Société de transport de Montréal in Montreal, Quebec, Canada. Five stations are under construction and are scheduled to open in the early 2030s.

== Lines ==
| Line | Terminus | Length | Stations |
|---|---|---|---|
| Green | Angrignon to Honoré-Beaugrand | 22.1 kilometres (13.7 miles) | 27 |
| Orange | Côte-Vertu to Montmorency | approx. 24.8 kilometres (15.4 miles) | 31 |
| Yellow | Berri–UQAM to Longueuil | 4.25 kilometres (2.64 miles) | 3 |
| Blue | Snowdon to Saint-Michel (future: Snowdon to Anjou) | 9.7 kilometres (6.0 miles) | 12 (+5 under construction) |

== Current stations ==
| Name | Odonym | Namesake | Line | Accessible | Opened |
|---|---|---|---|---|---|
| Angrignon | Boulevard Angrignon; Parc Angrignon | Jean-Baptiste Angrignon, city councillor | Green Line (Montreal Metro) | Yes (2022) | 3 Sep 1978 |
| Monk | Boulevard Monk | James Monk, Quebec Attorney-General | Green Line (Montreal Metro) | | 3 Sep 1978 |
| Jolicoeur | Rue Jolicoeur | Jean-Moïse Jolicoeur, parish priest | Green Line (Montreal Metro) | Yes (2022) | 3 Sep 1978 |
| Verdun | Rue de Verdun; borough of Verdun | Notre-Dame-de-Saverdun, France, hometown of Seigneur Zacharie Dupuis | Green Line (Montreal Metro) | | 3 Sep 1978 |
| De l'Église | Avenue de l'Église | Église Saint-Paul | Green Line (Montreal Metro) | | 3 Sep 1978 |
| LaSalle | Boulevard LaSalle | Robert Cavelier de La Salle, French explorer, founder of Lachine | Green Line (Montreal Metro) | | 3 Sep 1978 |
| Charlevoix | Rue Charlevoix | Pierre François Xavier de Charlevoix, French historian and explorer | Green Line (Montreal Metro) | | 3 Sep 1978 |
| Lionel-Groulx | Avenue Lionel-Groulx | Fr. Lionel Groulx, Quebec historian | Green Line (Montreal Metro) Orange Line (Montreal Metro) | Yes (2009) | 3 Sep 1978; 28 Apr 1980 |
| Atwater | Avenue Atwater | Edwin Atwater, city councillor | Green Line (Montreal Metro) | Yes (2025) | 14 Oct 1966 |
| Guy–Concordia | Rue Guy Concordia University | Étienne Guy, landowner Concordia salus (Prosperity Through Concord), motto of Montreal | Green Line (Montreal Metro) | | 14 Oct 1966 |
| Peel | Rue Peel | Robert Peel, British Prime Minister | Green Line (Montreal Metro) | | 14 Oct 1966 |
| McGill | McGill College Avenue; McGill University | James McGill, Businessman | Green Line (Montreal Metro) | Yes (2023) | 14 Oct 1966 |
| Place-des-Arts | Place des Arts cultural complex | Place des Arts cultural complex | Green Line (Montreal Metro) | Yes (2022) | 14 Oct 1966 |
| Saint-Laurent | Boulevard Saint-Laurent | So-called as the old road to Saint-Laurent | Green Line (Montreal Metro) | | 14 Oct 1966 |
| Berri–UQAM | Rue Berri Université du Québec à Montréal | Simon Després dit Le Berry, land owner (1659) Université du Québec à Montréal | Green Line (Montreal Metro) Orange Line (Montreal Metro) Yellow Line (Montreal Metro) | Orange (2009); Green (2020) | 14 Oct 1966 1 Apr 1967 |
| Beaudry | Rue Beaudry | Pierre Beaudry, landowner | Green Line (Montreal Metro) | | 21 Dec 1966 |
| Papineau | Avenue Papineau | Joseph Papineau, Quebec politician (father of Louis-Joseph Papineau) | Green Line (Montreal Metro) | | 14 Oct 1966 |
| Frontenac | Rue Frontenac | Louis de Buade de Frontenac, Governor General of New France | Green Line (Montreal Metro) | | 19 Dec 1966 |
| Préfontaine | Rue Préfontaine; Parc Raymond-Préfontaine | Raymond Préfontaine, mayor of Montreal | Green Line (Montreal Metro) | Yes (2021) | 6 Jun 1976 |
| Joliette | Rue Joliette | Barthélemy Joliette, founder of Joliette, Quebec | Green Line (Montreal Metro) | | 6 Jun 1976 |
| Pie-IX | Boulevard Pie-IX | Pope Pius IX | Green Line (Montreal Metro) | Yes (2022) | 6 Jun 1976 |
| Viau | Rue Viau | Charles-Théodore Viau, Quebec cookie magnate | Green Line (Montreal Metro) | Yes (2021) | 6 Jun 1976 |
| Assomption | Boulevard de l'Assomption | Dogma of the Assumption of Mary | Green Line (Montreal Metro) | | after 6 Jun 1976 |
| Cadillac | Rue de Cadillac | Antoine Laumet de La Mothe, sieur de Cadillac, French explorer | Green Line (Montreal Metro) | | 6 Jun 1976 |
| Langelier | Boulevard Langelier | François-Charles-Stanislas Langelier, mayor of Quebec City and Lieutenant Governor of Quebec | Green Line (Montreal Metro) | | 6 Jun 1976 |
| Radisson | Rue Radisson | Pierre-Esprit Radisson, French explorer | Green Line (Montreal Metro) | | 6 Jun 1976 |
| Honoré-Beaugrand | Rue Honoré-Beaugrand | Honoré Beaugrand, Quebec author and mayor of Montreal | Green Line (Montreal Metro) | Yes (2018) | 6 Jun 1976 |
| Côte-Vertu | Boulevard de la Côte-Vertu | Notre-Dame-de-la-Vertu (Our Lady of Virtue), 18th-century name for the area | Orange Line (Montreal Metro) | Yes (2010) | 3 Nov 1986 |
| Du Collège | Rue du Collège | Collège Saint Laurent, former ecclesiastical college, now Cégep de Saint-Laurent, local cégep | Orange Line (Montreal Metro) | Yes (2018) | 9 Jan 1984 |
| De la Savane | Rue de la Savane | savane — a savanna or Quebec French for swamp | Orange Line (Montreal Metro) | | 9 Jan 1984 |
| Namur | Rue Namur | Namur, Belgium | Orange Line (Montreal Metro) | | 9 Jan 1984 |
| Plamondon | Avenue Plamondon | Antoine Plamondon, Quebec painter, or Rodolphe Plamondon, Quebec lyric artist | Orange Line (Montreal Metro) | | 29 Jan 1982 |
| Côte-Sainte-Catherine | Chemin de la Côte-Sainte-Catherine | Côte Sainte-Catherine, 18th century name for area of Outremont | Orange Line (Montreal Metro) | | 4 Jan 1982 |
| Snowdon | Rue Snowdon; Snowdon neighbourhood | Name of area's former landowner | Orange Line (Montreal Metro) Blue Line (Montreal Metro) | Yes (2016) | 7 Sep 1981; 4 Jan 1988 |
| Villa-Maria | Villa-Maria High School | Latin form of "Ville-Marie", former name of Montreal | Orange Line (Montreal Metro) | Yes (2022) | 7 Sep 1981 |
| Vendôme | Avenue de Vendôme | Likely from the French Dukes of Vendôme | Orange Line (Montreal Metro) | Yes (2021) | 7 Sep 1981 |
| Place-Saint-Henri | Place Saint-Henri | A parish church named for Saint Henry II, to commemorate Fr. Henri-Auguste Roux | Orange Line (Montreal Metro) | Yes (2024) | 28 Apr 1980 |
| Georges-Vanier | Boulevard Georges-Vanier | Georges Vanier, Governor General of Canada | Orange Line (Montreal Metro) | | 28 Apr 1980 |
| Lucien-L'Allier | Rue Lucien-L'Allier | Lucien L'Allier, Quebec engineer, designer of the Metro | Orange Line (Montreal Metro) | | 28 Apr 1980 |
| Bonaventure | Place Bonaventure | Gare Bonaventure, in turn for former Rue Bonaventure; St Bonaventure, Italian cleric | Orange Line (Montreal Metro) | Yes (2009) | 13 Feb 1967 |
| Square-Victoria–OACI | Square Victoria International Civil Aviation Organization | Queen Victoria Nearby headquarters of ICAO | Orange Line (Montreal Metro) | | 6 Feb 1967 |
| Place-d'Armes | Place d'Armes | Historical rallying point for city's defenders | Orange Line (Montreal Metro) | Yes (2017) | 14 Oct 1966 |
| Champ-de-Mars | Champ de Mars Park | Common term for military exercise ground (Mars, god of war) | Orange Line (Montreal Metro) | Yes (2014) | 14 Oct 1966 |
| Sherbrooke | Rue Sherbrooke | John Coape Sherbrooke, Governor General of British North America | Orange Line (Montreal Metro) | | 14 Oct 1966 |
| Mont-Royal | Avenue du Mont-Royal | Mount Royal | Orange Line (Montreal Metro) | Yes (2022) | 14 Oct 1966 |
| Laurier | Avenue Laurier | Wilfrid Laurier, Prime Minister of Canada | Orange Line (Montreal Metro) | | 14 Oct 1966 |
| Rosemont | Boulevard Rosemont; Rosemont neighbourhood | Named by developer U.-H. Dandurand for his mother, née Rose Phillips | Orange Line (Montreal Metro) | Yes (2017) | 14 Oct 1966 |
| Beaubien | Rue Beaubien | Prominent landowning family | Orange Line (Montreal Metro) | | 14 Oct 1966 |
| Jean-Talon | Rue Jean-Talon | Jean Talon, intendant of New France | Orange Line (Montreal Metro) Blue Line (Montreal Metro) | Orange (2015) Blue (2019) | 14 Oct 1966; 16 Jun 1986 |
| Jarry | Rue Jarry | Stanislas Blénier dit Jarry père, landowner | Orange Line (Montreal Metro) | | 14 Oct 1966 |
| Crémazie | Boulevard Crémazie | Octave Crémazie, Québécois poet | Orange Line (Montreal Metro) | | 14 Oct 1966 |
| Sauvé | Rue Sauvé | Name of a landowner | Orange Line (Montreal Metro) | | 14 Oct 1966 |
| Henri-Bourassa | Boulevard Henri-Bourassa | Henri Bourassa, Quebec journalist and politician | Orange Line (Montreal Metro) | Yes (2010) | 14 Oct 1966 |
| Cartier | Boulevard Cartier | Sir George-Étienne Cartier Quebec politician, Father of Confederation | Orange Line (Montreal Metro) | Yes (2007) | 28 Apr 2007 |
| De la Concorde | Boulevard de la Concorde | Place de la Concorde in Paris | Orange Line (Montreal Metro) | Yes (2007) | 28 Apr 2007 |
| Montmorency | Collège Montmorency | François de Montmorency-Laval, first Roman Catholic Bishop of Quebec and landowner of Île Jésus (Laval) | Orange Line (Montreal Metro) | Yes (2007) | 28 Apr 2007 |
| Jean-Drapeau | Parc Jean-Drapeau Île Sainte-Hélène | Jean Drapeau, late ex-mayor of Montreal Named by Samuel de Champlain for his wife, née Hélène Boullé | Yellow Line (Montreal Metro) | Yes, but no connection other accessible stations (2019) | 1 Apr 1967 |
| Longueuil–Université-de-Sherbrooke | City of Longueuil Université de Sherbrooke, Longueuil campus, in Édifice Saint-Charles | Probably for a town in Normandy Université de Sherbrooke, Longueuil campus, in Édifice Saint-Charles | Yellow Line (Montreal Metro) | | 1 Apr 1967 |
| Côte-des-Neiges | Chemin de la Côte-des-Neiges; Côte-des-Neiges neighbourhood | Former Village of Côte-des-Neiges; name Notre-Dame-des-Neiges (Our Lady of the Snows) dates to 18th century | Blue Line (Montreal Metro) | | 4 Jan 1988 |
| Université-de-Montréal | Université de Montréal | Université de Montréal | Blue Line (Montreal Metro) | | 4 Jan 1988 |
| Édouard-Montpetit | Boulevard Édouard-Montpetit | Édouard Montpetit, Quebec lawyer, economist and academic | Blue Line (Montreal Metro) | Yes (2026) | 4 Jan 1988 |
| Outremont | Avenue Outremont; borough of Outremont | Named for a prominent estate (Outremont means "other side of the mountain") | Blue Line (Montreal Metro) | Yes (2024) | 4 Jan 1988 |
| Acadie | Boulevard de l'Acadie | Commemorates bicentennial of the expulsion of the Acadians | Blue Line (Montreal Metro) | | 28 Mar 1988 |
| Parc | Avenue du Parc | Mount Royal Park | Blue Line (Montreal Metro) | | 15 Jun 1987 |
| De Castelnau | Rue de Castelnau | Édouard de Castelnau, French soldier | Blue Line (Montreal Metro) | | 16 Jun 1986 |
| Fabre | Rue Fabre | Édouard-Charles Fabre, first Roman Catholic Bishop of Montreal | Blue Line (Montreal Metro) | | 16 Jun 1986 |
| D'Iberville | Rue d'Iberville | Pierre Le Moyne d'Iberville, Quebec explorer, founder of Louisiana | Blue Line (Montreal Metro) | Yes (2024) | 16 Jun 1986 |
| Saint-Michel | Boulevard Saint-Michel; neighbourhood of Saint-Michel | Saint Michael; long-standing name | Blue Line (Montreal Metro) | | 16 Jun 1986 |

== Future stations ==
| Tentative name | Odonym | Namesake | Line |
|---|---|---|---|
| Vertières | | Battle of Vertières | Blue Line (Montreal Metro) |
| Mary-Two-Axe-Earley | | Mary Two-Axe Earley, Indigenous women's rights activist | Blue Line (Montreal Metro) |
| Césira-Parisotto | | Césira Parisotto, Italian-Canadian nun known for charitable work | Blue Line (Montreal Metro) |
| Madeleine-Parent | | Madeleine Parent, trade unionist and women's rights activist | Blue Line (Montreal Metro) |
| Anjou | Borough of Anjou | Province of Anjou, France | Blue Line (Montreal Metro) |

== Interstation distances ==
| Section | Line | Metres | Yards |
|---|---|---|---|
| Angrignon to Monk | Green Line (Montreal Metro) | 844 | 923 |
| Monk to Jolicoeur | Green Line (Montreal Metro) | 1,063 | 1,163 |
| Jolicoeur to Verdun | Green Line (Montreal Metro) | 761 | 832 |
| Verdun to De l'Église | Green Line (Montreal Metro) | 564 | 617 |
| De l'Église to LaSalle | Green Line (Montreal Metro) | 812 | 888 |
| LaSalle to Charlevoix | Green Line (Montreal Metro) | 707 | 773 |
| Charlevoix to Lionel-Groulx | Green Line (Montreal Metro) | 1,077 | 1,178 |
| Lionel-Groulx to Atwater | Green Line (Montreal Metro) | 1,388 | 1,518 |
| Atwater to Guy–Concordia | Green Line (Montreal Metro) | 682 | 746 |
| Guy–Concordia to Peel | Green Line (Montreal Metro) | 593 | 649 |
| Peel to McGill | Green Line (Montreal Metro) | 297 | 325 |
| McGill to Place-des-Arts | Green Line (Montreal Metro) | 346 | 378 |
| Place-des-Arts to Saint-Laurent | Green Line (Montreal Metro) | 354 | 387 |
| Saint-Laurent to Berri–UQAM | Green Line (Montreal Metro) | 337 | 369 |
| Berri–UQAM to Beaudry | Green Line (Montreal Metro) | 379 | 414 |
| Beaudry to Papineau | Green Line (Montreal Metro) | 495 | 541 |
| Papineau to Frontenac | Green Line (Montreal Metro) | 1,158 | 1,266 |
| Frontenac to Préfontaine | Green Line (Montreal Metro) | 1,004 | 1,098 |
| Préfontaine to Joliette | Green Line (Montreal Metro) | 383 | 419 |
| Joliette to Pie-IX | Green Line (Montreal Metro) | 767 | 839 |
| Pie-IX to Viau | Green Line (Montreal Metro) | 622 | 680 |
| Viau to Assomption | Green Line (Montreal Metro) | 896 | 980 |
| Assomption to Cadillac | Green Line (Montreal Metro) | 782 | 855 |
| Cadillac to Langelier | Green Line (Montreal Metro) | 519 | 568 |
| Langelier to Radisson | Green Line (Montreal Metro) | 622 | 680 |
| Radisson to Honoré-Beaugrand | Green Line (Montreal Metro) | 717 | 784 |
| Côte-Vertu to Du Collège | Orange Line (Montreal Metro) | 777 | 850 |
| Du Collège to De La Savane | Orange Line (Montreal Metro) | 1,282 | 1,402 |
| De La Savane to Namur | Orange Line (Montreal Metro) | 787 | 861 |
| Namur to Plamondon | Orange Line (Montreal Metro) | 988 | 1,080 |
| Plamondon to Côte-Sainte-Catherine | Orange Line (Montreal Metro) | 451 | 493 |
| Côte-Sainte-Catherine to Snowdon | Orange Line (Montreal Metro) | 693 | 758 |
| Snowdon to Villa-Maria | Orange Line (Montreal Metro) | 884 | 967 |
| Villa-Maria to Vendôme | Orange Line (Montreal Metro) | 1,407 | 1,539 |
| Vendôme to Place-Saint-Henri | Orange Line (Montreal Metro) | 1,451 | 1,587 |
| Place-Saint-Henri to Lionel-Groulx | Orange Line (Montreal Metro) | 580 | 630 |
| Lionel-Groulx to Georges-Vanier | Orange Line (Montreal Metro) | 759 | 830 |
| Georges-Vanier to Lucien-L'Allier | Orange Line (Montreal Metro) | 531 | 581 |
| Lucien-L'Allier to Bonaventure | Orange Line (Montreal Metro) | 382 | 418 |
| Bonaventure to Square-Victoria–OACI | Orange Line (Montreal Metro) | 393 | 430 |
| Square-Victoria–OACI to Place-d'Armes | Orange Line (Montreal Metro) | 357 | 390 |
| Place-d'Armes to Champ-de-Mars | Orange Line (Montreal Metro) | 371 | 406 |
| Champ-de-Mars to Berri–UQAM | Orange Line (Montreal Metro) | 721 | 788 |
| Berri–UQAM to Sherbrooke | Orange Line (Montreal Metro) | 579 | 633 |
| Sherbrooke to Mont-Royal | Orange Line (Montreal Metro) | 932 | 1,019 |
| Mont-Royal to Laurier | Orange Line (Montreal Metro) | 500 | 550 |
| Laurier to Rosemont | Orange Line (Montreal Metro) | 746 | 816 |
| Rosemont to Beaubien | Orange Line (Montreal Metro) | 541 | 592 |
| Beaubien to Jean-Talon | Orange Line (Montreal Metro) | 712 | 779 |
| Jean-Talon to Jarry | Orange Line (Montreal Metro) | 977 | 1,068 |
| Jarry to Crémazie | Orange Line (Montreal Metro) | 826 | 903 |
| Crémazie to Sauvé | Orange Line (Montreal Metro) | 1,280 | 1,400 |
| Sauvé to Henri-Bourassa | Orange Line (Montreal Metro) | 772 | 844 |
| Henri-Bourassa to Cartier | Orange Line (Montreal Metro) | 1,102 | 1,205 |
| Cartier to De la Concorde | Orange Line (Montreal Metro) | 2,074 | 2,268 |
| De la Concorde to Montmorency | Orange Line (Montreal Metro) | 848 | 927 |
| Berri–UQAM to Jean-Drapeau | Yellow Line (Montreal Metro) | 2,362 | 2,583 |
| Jean-Drapeau to Longueuil–Université-de-Sherbrooke | Yellow Line (Montreal Metro) | 1,572 | 1,719 |
| Snowdon to Côte-des-Neiges | Blue Line (Montreal Metro) | 960 | 1,050 |
| Côte-des-Neiges to Université-de-Montréal | Blue Line (Montreal Metro) | 765 | 837 |
| Université-de-Montréal to Édouard-Montpetit | Blue Line (Montreal Metro) | 668 | 731 |
| Édouard-Montpetit to Outremont | Blue Line (Montreal Metro) | 1,091 | 1,193 |
| Outremont to Acadie | Blue Line (Montreal Metro) | 729 | 797 |
| Acadie to Parc | Blue Line (Montreal Metro) | 728 | 796 |
| Parc to De Castelnau | Blue Line (Montreal Metro) | 491 | 537 |
| De Castelnau to Jean-Talon | Blue Line (Montreal Metro) | 472 | 516 |
| Jean-Talon to Fabre | Blue Line (Montreal Metro) | 840 | 920 |
| Fabre to D'Iberville | Blue Line (Montreal Metro) | 645 | 705 |
| D'Iberville to Saint-Michel | Blue Line (Montreal Metro) | 608 | 665 |

== See also ==
- Réseau express métropolitain#Stations
