= Orange Line (Montreal Metro) =

Montreal Metro subway line

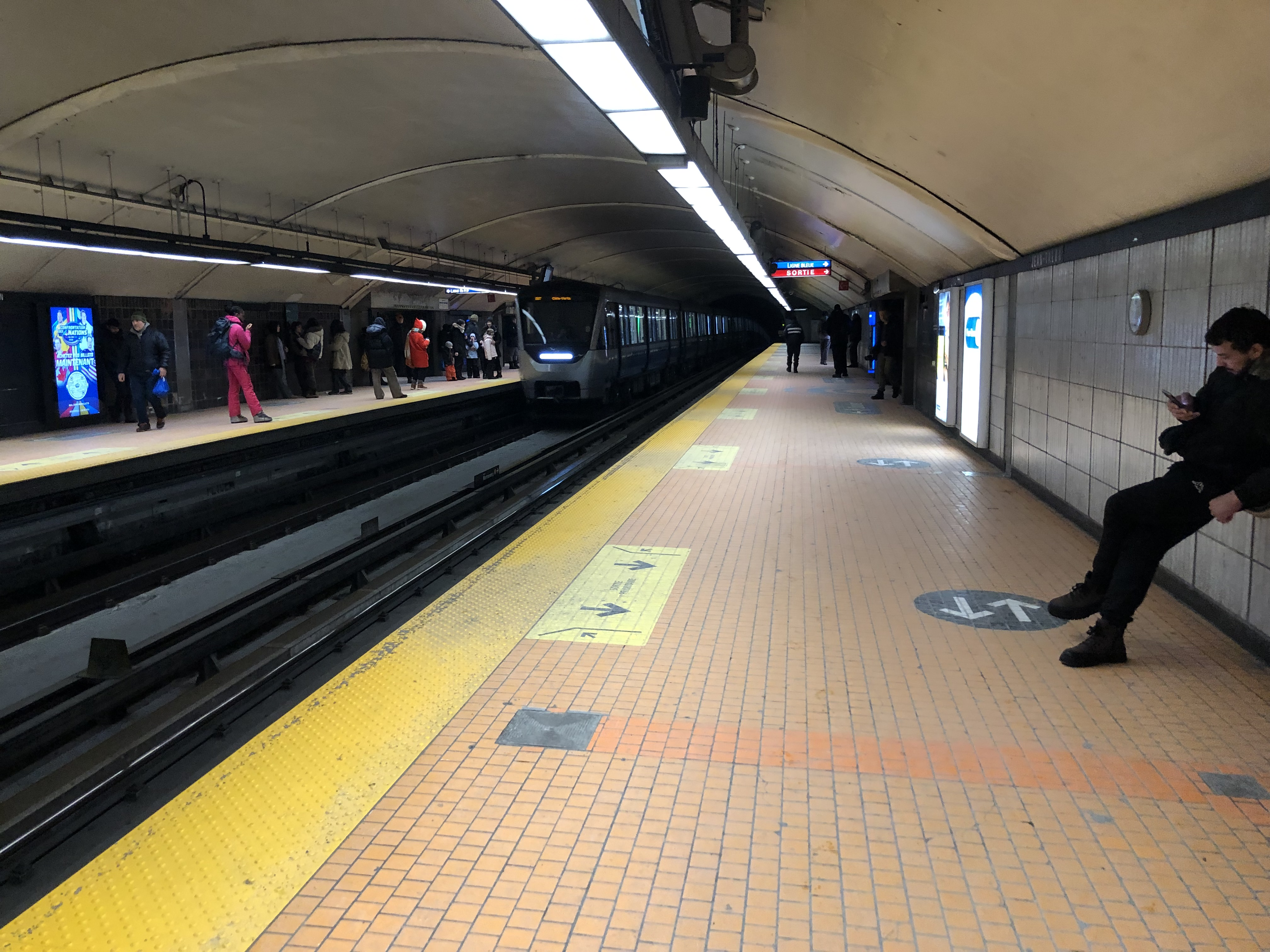
- Metro arriving at Jean-Talon Station

Overview
- Native name: Ligne orange (French)
- Line number: 2
- Locale: Montreal, Quebec, Canada
- Termini: Côte-Vertu; Montmorency
- Stations: 31

Service
- Type: Rapid transit
- System: Montreal Metro
- Operator: Société de transport de Montréal (STM)
- Depot(s): Plateau d'Youville, Saint-Charles, Montmorency, Centre d'attachement Duvernay, Snowdon tail tracks and connecting track, Côte-Vertu
- Rolling stock: Bombardier/Alstom MPM-10 (Azur)

History
- Opened: October 14, 1966; 60 years ago
- April 28, 1980: Opening of western extension to Place-Saint-Henri
- September 7, 1981: Opening of northern extension to Snowdon
- April 28, 2007: Opening of northern extension to Montmorency

Technical
- Line length: 30.0 km (18.6 mi)
- Track gauge: 1,435 mm (4 ft 8 1/2 in) standard gauge
- Electrification: Guide bar, 750 V DC
- Operating speed: 25–72 km/h (16–45 mph)
Route map
Orange Line highlighted in orange

The Orange Line (French: Ligne orange, pronounced [liɲ ɔʁɑ̃ʒ]), also known as Line 2 (French: Ligne 2), is the longest and first-planned of the four subway lines of the Montreal Metro in Montreal, Quebec, Canada. It formed part of the initial network, and was extended from 1980 to 1986. On April 28, 2007, three new stations in Laval opened, making it the second Metro line to leave Montreal Island after the Yellow Line.

The Orange Line measures 30 kilometres (19 mi) in length and counts 31 stations. It is the longest metro line in Montreal and the third-longest in Canada after the Line 1 Yonge–University of the Toronto subway and the Expo Line of the Vancouver SkyTrain. Like the rest of the Metro network, it is entirely underground. The line runs in a U-shape (also similar to Line 1 Yonge-University) from Côte-Vertu in western Montreal to Montmorency in Laval, northwest of Montreal.

== History ==
On November 3, 1961, Montreal City Council approved an initial Metro network 16 kilometres (9.9 mi) in length. Line 2 (Orange Line) was to run from north of the downtown, from Crémazie station through various residential neighbourhoods to the business district at Place-d'Armes station.

Work on the Orange Line began on May 23, 1962 on Berri Street just south of Jarry Street. In November 1962, the city of Montreal learned that it had been awarded the 1967 International and Universal Exposition (commonly known as Expo 67). To better meet the anticipated demand for transit during Expo 67, it was decided on August 6, 1963 to add the Sauvé and Henri-Bourassa stations in the north, and the Square-Victoria and Bonaventure stations in the south.

On October 14, 1966, the section between Henri-Bourassa and Place-d'Armes opened, forming part of the original Metro network. Completion of smaller sections were delayed by several months. On February 6, 1967, the segment from Place-d'Armes to Square-Victoria opened, followed on February 13, 1967, by Bonaventure.

Prior to the inauguration of the initial network, extensions were proposed in all directions, including the West Island. In its 1967 Urban Plan, entitled "Horizon 2000", the city of Montreal planned to build a network of almost 100 miles (160 km) by the end of the twentieth century. On February 12, 1971, the council of the Montreal Urban Community authorized the borrowing of C$430 million to extend the Metro. This amount increased to C$665 million in 1973, and to C$1.6 billion in 1975. This expansion plan included the costs of extending the Orange Line westward, a distance of 20.5 kilometres (12.7 mi), adding 16 new stations, as well as the construction of a new garage. The terminus station, Salaberry, would have been an intermodal station with Bois-Franc commuter rail station.

From the beginning, the plan was to expand the Metro to the northwest, but massive cost overruns on the expansion of the Green Line in preparation for the 1976 Summer Olympics, led to several years of delays, including a moratorium on underground expansions in 1976. To cut costs, three planned stations (Poirier, Bois-Franc, De Salaberry) and a maintenance workshop at the end of the track were eliminated.

In 1979, the Minister of Transport, Denis de Belleval, proposed to complete the subway extension to Du Collège and to extend the rest of the line above ground. This transportation plan was rejected by the mayors of the Montreal Urban Community. The moratorium was lifted in February 1981, with a new agreement that approved the construction of one additional station, Côte-Vertu. Du Collège was considered inappropriate to play the role of a terminus.

The western segment was constructed in the 1980s and was opened in several stages. On April 28, 1980, it was extended from Bonaventure to Place-Saint-Henri. From there, the line was extended to Snowdon on September 7, 1981, on January 4, 1982 to Côte-Sainte-Catherine, on June 29, 1982 to Plamondon, on January 9, 1984 to Du Collège, and finally on November 3, 1986 to the western terminus of Côte-Vertu.

=== Laval extension ===
After a break of more than two decades of expansion, the eastern segment was extended from Henri-Bourassa by three stations into the city of Laval. The 5.2 kilometres (3.2 mi) section required digging a tunnel under the Rivière des Prairies. The three stations were Cartier, De la Concorde and Montmorency. Montmorency station is near Collège Montmorency and the Laval campus of the Université de Montréal.

The Laval extension was inaugurated on April 26, 2007, and it opened to the public on April 28. It was completely financed by the Government of Quebec, which mandated for the former Agence métropolitaine de transport (AMT) (now ARTM) to realize the project. The STM acted as a subcontractor for the AMT and was responsible for the installation of fixed equipment. The project extended the Orange Line by 5.2 kilometres (3.2 mi), 4.9 kilometres (3.0 mi) not including the depot past Montmorency, at a cost of roughly C$143.27 million/km, which is slightly below the average cost for Metro extensions in other major cities. The total cost of the extension was $745 million. To that amount, $12.4 million was added in 2008 to build a second entrance to Cartier station in Libellules Park, located northeast of the intersection of des Laurentides and Cartier.

=== Accessibility ===
When opened in 2007, the stations on the Laval extension were the first accessible stations on the Metro, with elevators and other features for disabled persons.

In the 2010s and 2020s, older stations were retrofitted to be made accessible, with the installation of elevators. As of 2024, 16 of the 31 Orange Line stations are accessible, including all four interchange stations at Berri-UQAM, Lionel-Groulx, Jean-Talon and Snowdon. STM plans for all stations to be made accessible by the late 2030s.

=== Platform edge doors ===
In 2019, the STM announced plans to install platform edge doors on the Orange Line, to improve safety and reduce passenger incidents (dropped objects, falls etc). The 2021–2030 Capital Expenditure Program estimated the project would cost around $560M. Due to financial difficulties following the COVID-19 pandemic, the project was cancelled in 2022.

== Future extensions ==
In the medium term, there are plans for the Orange Line to be further extended toward the northwest from Côte-Vertu. The extension would include two new stations: Poirier and Bois-Franc. The latter would create a transportation hub with the existing Bois-Franc station on the Réseau express métropolitain light metro.

After the extension of the line into Laval, Gilles Vaillancourt, a former mayor of Laval, suggested for a further six stations to be added to the line. Three of them would be in Laval and three in Montreal, which would together turn the Orange Line into a loop. In 2011, the City of Laval proposed adding eight more stations to the line, including five in Laval, to complete the loop and to serve the Carrefour Laval terminus.

On June 18, 2019, the Autorité régionale de transport métropolitain approved a report for extending the Orange Line by 6.4 km to the north and east of the current Côte-Vertu terminus in St-Laurent to Montmorency station in Laval, which would create a loop. Five new stations would be built located at Poirier Street, Bois-Franc, and Gouin Boulevard in Montreal, and at Chomedey and Notre-Dame Boulevard near Autoroute 15 in Laval. The extension would cost an estimated $4.5 billion and put the project in line with the estimated $4.5-billion cost of the Blue Line extension to Anjou.

As of March 2025, Laval is interested in building an extension with five new stations located within itself. The proposed extension would include extending the western portion of the line from Côte-Vertu northwest into Laval, with stations at Chomedey, Curé-Labelle, Saint-Martin, and Le Carrefour, and the eastern portion of the line from Montmorency to Saint-Martin, with an intermediate station at Souvenir, creating a loop. Six companies that own land along the proposed extension corridor have signed on to voluntarily give up land, avoiding the need for land expropriation.

== Infrastructure ==
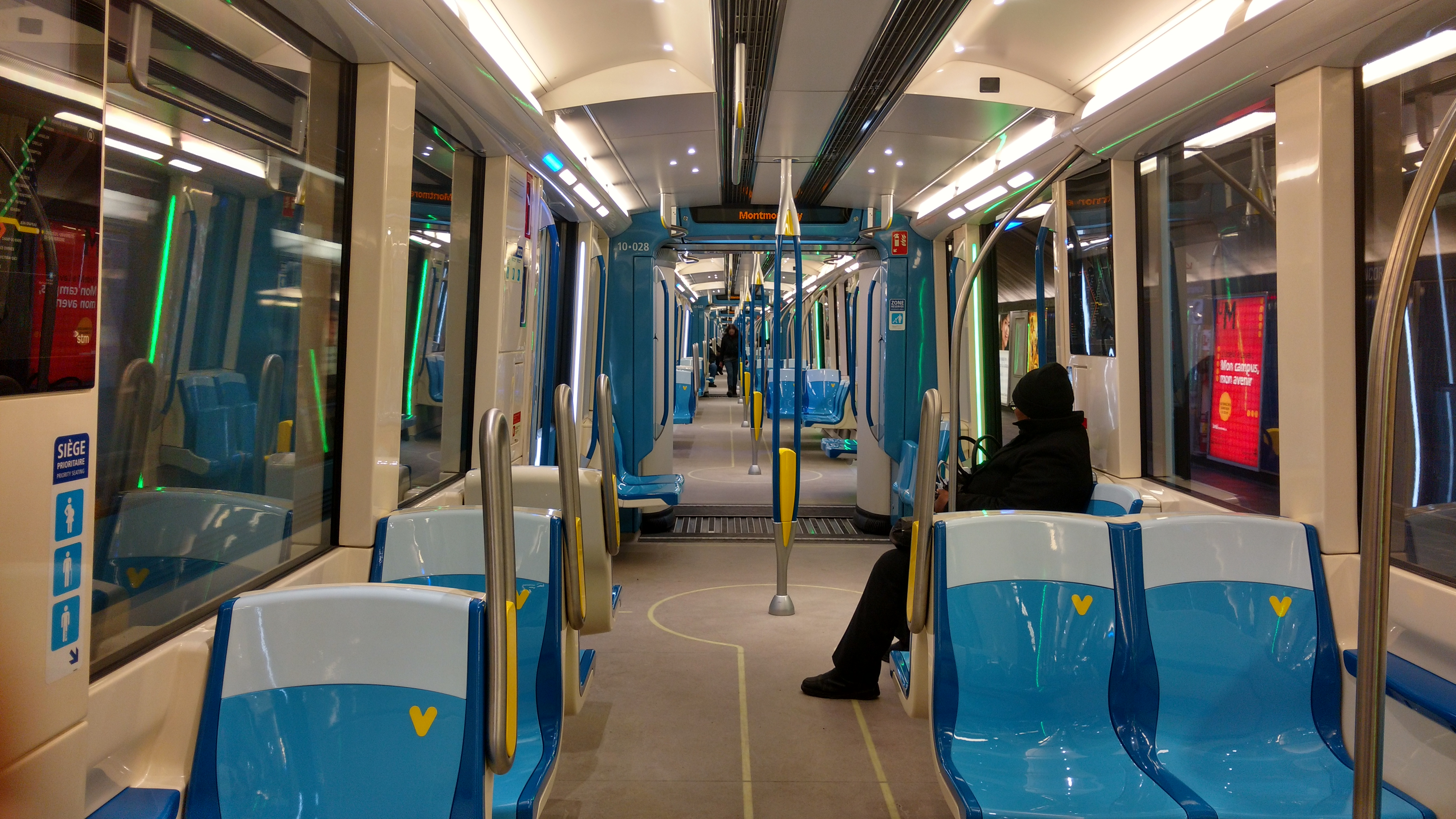
The interior of a MPM-10 train.

=== Maintenance ===
The Metro trains are stored in the Saint-Charles Garage, north of Henri-Bourassa station, and in the garage at Montmorency station for passenger cars. They are maintained at the Plateau d'Youville, which is located between Crémazie and Sauvé stations. Centre d'attachement Duvernay, which is connected to the Green Line, is used for maintenance of way equipment. The Snowdon tail tracks and connecting track, which is connected to the Blue Line, is also used for maintenance of way equipment.

A new garage was built immediately north of Côte-Vertu station that opened in March 2022, expanding the capacity of the Orange line by 25% and reducing wait time between trains from 2 minutes and 30 seconds to 2 minutes across the entire line.

== Service ==
=== Operation hours and frequency ===
The Orange Line operates between 5:30 a.m. and 12:30 a.m on weekdays and Sunday, and between 5:30 a.m. and 1:00 a.m on Saturday. Trains arrive at stations every 2 to 4 minutes during peak periods, every 4 to 10 minutes during off peak periods, and every 6 to 12 minutes on weekends.

=== Rolling stock ===
At the line's opening in 1966, MR-63 cars were used on the Orange Line. In 1985, the MR-73s were introduced on the Orange Line. The MR-73 is the second model of the Montreal Metro trains, identified by rectangular cab headlights, blue and dark orange interiors, 124 kW (166 hp) traction motors that growl while they accelerate out of a station, side vents, and a unique three-note sound signature when the train pulls out of a station.

With the introduction of the newer MPM-10 trains in 2016, the MR-73 trains in service on the line were gradually transferred over to the Green and Yellow lines, and since December 2018, they are the sole rolling stock on the Orange Line. On June 20, 2018, a decorated MR-63 train gave a final "farewell tour" of the Orange Line before the model was retired from the entire system the following day.

== List of stations ==
Station	Inauguration date	Odonym	Namesake	Transfers/connections	Location
Côte-Vertu	September 3, 1986	Côte-Vertu Boulevard	Notre-Dame-de-la-Vertu (Our Lady of Virtue; 18th century name for the area)	Terminus Côte-Vertu	Saint-Laurent
Du Collège	January 9, 1984	Du Collège Street	Cégep de Saint-Laurent (local cégep)		Saint-Laurent
De la Savane	January 9, 1984	De la Savane Street	savane (a savanna or Québécois for swamp)		Côte-des-Neiges– Notre-Dame-de-Grâce
Namur	January 9, 1984	Namur Street	Namur, Belgium		Côte-des-Neiges– Notre-Dame-de-Grâce
Plamondon	June 29, 1982	Plamondon Avenue	Antoine Plamondon (Québécois painter); Rodolphe Plamondon (Québécois lyric artist)		Côte-des-Neiges– Notre-Dame-de-Grâce
Côte-Sainte-Catherine	January 4, 1982	Côte-Sainte-Catherine Road	Côte Sainte-Catherine, 18th century name for area of Outremont		Côte-des-Neiges– Notre-Dame-de-Grâce
Snowdon	September 7, 1981	Snowdon Street, Snowdon neighbourhood	Name of area's former landowner	Blue Line	Côte-des-Neiges– Notre-Dame-de-Grâce
Villa-Maria	September 7, 1981	Villa-Maria High School	Latin form of Ville-Marie (former name of Montreal)		Côte-des-Neiges– Notre-Dame-de-Grâce
Vendôme	September 7, 1981	De Vendôme Avenue	Likely from the French Dukes of Vendôme	At Vendôme: Candiac line; Saint-Jérôme line; Vaudreuil-Hudson line	Côte-des-Neiges– Notre-Dame-de-Grâce
Place-Saint-Henri	April 28, 1980	Place Saint-Henri	A parish church named for Saint Henry II (to commemorate Fr. Henri-Auguste Roux)		Le Sud-Ouest
Lionel-Groulx	April 28, 1980	Lionel-Groulx Avenue	Fr. Lionel Groulx, Quebec historian	Green Line	Le Sud-Ouest
Georges-Vanier	April 28, 1980	Georges-Vanier Boulevard	Georges Vanier, Governor General of Canada		Le Sud-Ouest
Lucien-L'Allier	April 28, 1980	Lucien-L'Allier Street	Lucien L'Allier (General Manager of the Transit Commission when the Metro opened)	At Lucien-L'Allier: Candiac line; Saint-Jérôme line; Vaudreuil-Hudson line	Ville-Marie
Bonaventure	February 13, 1967	Place Bonaventure	Bonaventure Station, in turn for former Bonaventure Street; St. Bonaventure, Italian cleric	At Montreal Central Station: Mont-Saint-Hilaire line; Adirondack; Réseau express métropolitain; Terminus Centre-Ville	Ville-Marie
Square-Victoria–OACI	February 7, 1967	Victoria Square; International Civil Aviation Organization	Queen Victoria; ICAO headquarters		Ville-Marie
Place-d'Armes	October 14, 1966	Place d'Armes	Historical rallying point for city's defenders		Ville-Marie
Champ-de-Mars	October 14, 1966	Champ de Mars Park	Common term for military exercise ground (Mars, god of war)		Ville-Marie
Berri–UQAM	October 14, 1966	Berri Street; Université du Québec à Montréal; De Montigny Street	Simon Després dit Le Berry and Testard de Montigny	Green Line; Yellow Line; Gare d'autocars de Montréal	Ville-Marie
Sherbrooke	October 14, 1966	Sherbrooke Street	John Coape Sherbrooke (governor-general of British North America)		Le Plateau- Mont-Royal
Mont-Royal	October 14, 1966	Mount Royal Avenue	Mount Royal		Le Plateau- Mont-Royal
Laurier	October 14, 1966	Laurier Avenue	Wilfrid Laurier, Prime Minister of Canada		Le Plateau- Mont-Royal
Rosemont	October 14, 1966	Rosemont Boulevard; Rosemont neighbourhood	Named by developer U.-H. Dandurand for his mother, née Rose Phillips		Rosemont– La Petite-Patrie
Beaubien	October 14, 1966	Beaubien Street	Prominent landowning family		Rosemont– La Petite-Patrie
Jean-Talon	October 14, 1966	Jean Talon Street	Jean Talon, intendant of New France	Blue Line	Villeray– Saint-Michel– Parc-Extension
Jarry	October 14, 1966	Jarry Street	Stanislas Blénier dit Jarry père, landowner Honoré-Bernard Bleignier Jarry		Villeray– Saint-Michel– Parc-Extension
Crémazie	October 14, 1966	Crémazie Boulevard	Octave Crémazie, Quebec poet		Villeray– Saint-Michel– Parc-Extension
Sauvé	October 14, 1966	Sauvé Street	Name of a landowner	At Sauvé station: Mascouche line	Ahuntsic- Cartierville
Henri-Bourassa	October 14, 1966	Henri Bourassa Boulevard	Henri Bourassa, Québécois journalist and politician	Terminus Henri-Bourassa	Ahuntsic- Cartierville
Cartier	April 28, 2007	Cartier Boulevard	Sir George-Étienne Cartier Québécois politician, Father of Confederation	Terminus Cartier	Laval
De la Concorde	April 28, 2007	De la Concorde Boulevard	Place de la Concorde in Paris	At De la Concorde station: Saint-Jérôme line	Laval
Montmorency	April 28, 2007	Collège Montmorency	François de Montmorency-Laval (first Roman Catholic Bishop of Quebec and landowner of Île Jésus)	Terminus Montmorency	Laval

== See also ==
- Green Line
- Yellow Line
- Blue Line
- Red Line (Line 3)
- List of Montreal Metro stations
