= Sherbrooke station =

Montreal Metro station

Sherbrooke
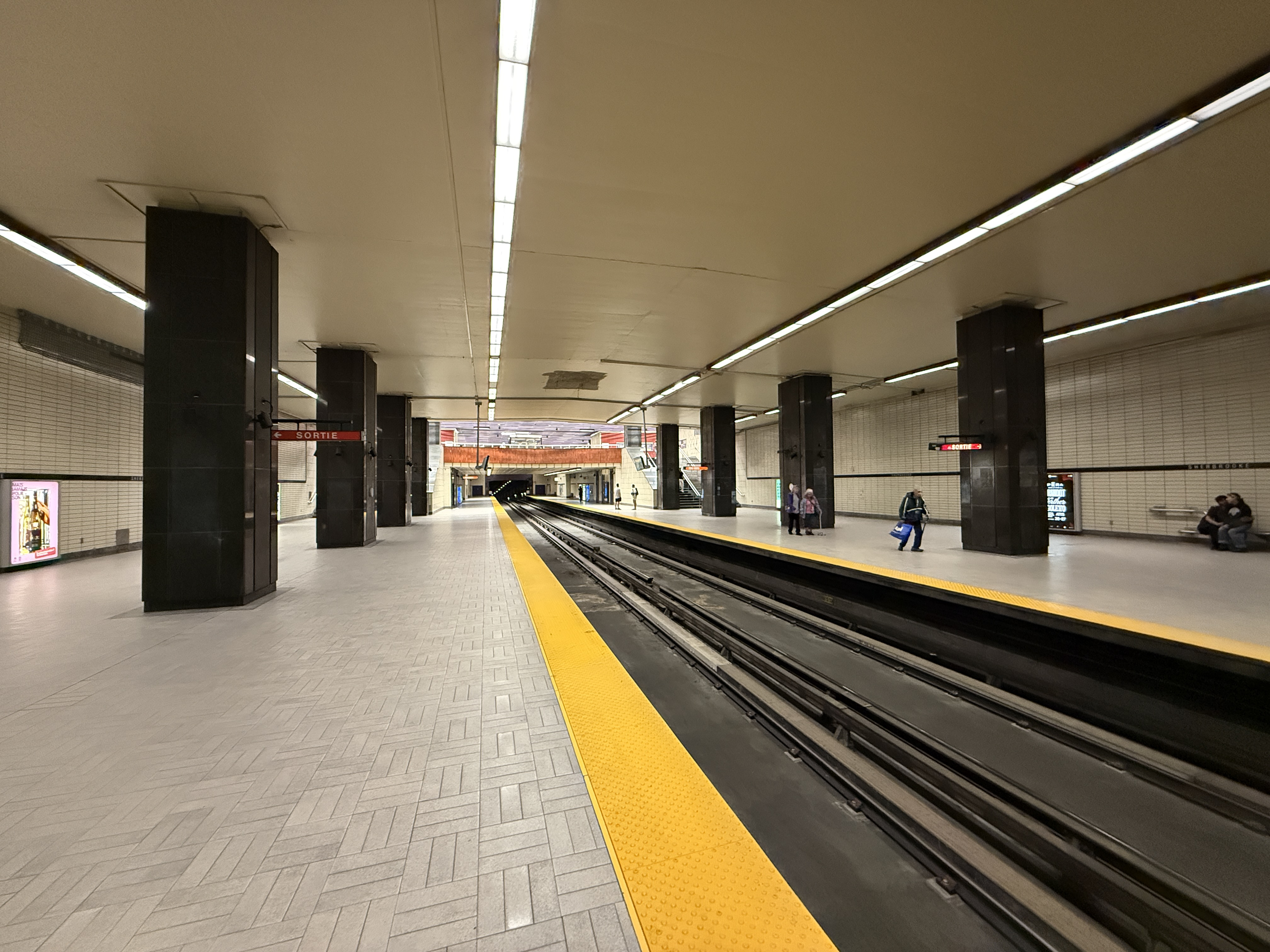
- Sherbrooke station platform (2026)

General information
- Location: 3580 and 3585, rue Berri; Montreal, Quebec H2L 4T8; Canada
- Coordinates: 45°31′08″N 73°34′08″W
- Operator: Société de transport de Montréal
- Platforms: 2 side platforms
- Tracks: 2
- Connections: STM bus

Construction
- Depth: 10.4 metres (34 feet 1 inch), 51st deepest
- Accessible: No
- Architect: Jean Dumontier; Crevier, Lemieux, Mercier et Caron

Other information
- Fare zone: ARTM: A

History
- Opened: 14 October 1966

Passengers
- 2024: 3,867,956 ▲11.05%
- Rank: 27 of 68

Services
Preceding station	Montreal Metro	Following station
Berri–UQAM toward Côte-Vertu	Orange Line	Mont-Royal toward Montmorency
Location

Sherbrooke station is a Montreal Metro station in the borough of Le Plateau-Mont-Royal in Montreal, Quebec, Canada. It is operated by the Société de transport de Montréal (STM) and serves the Orange Line. This station, near downtown, opened on October 14, 1966, as part of the original network of the Metro.

== Overview ==
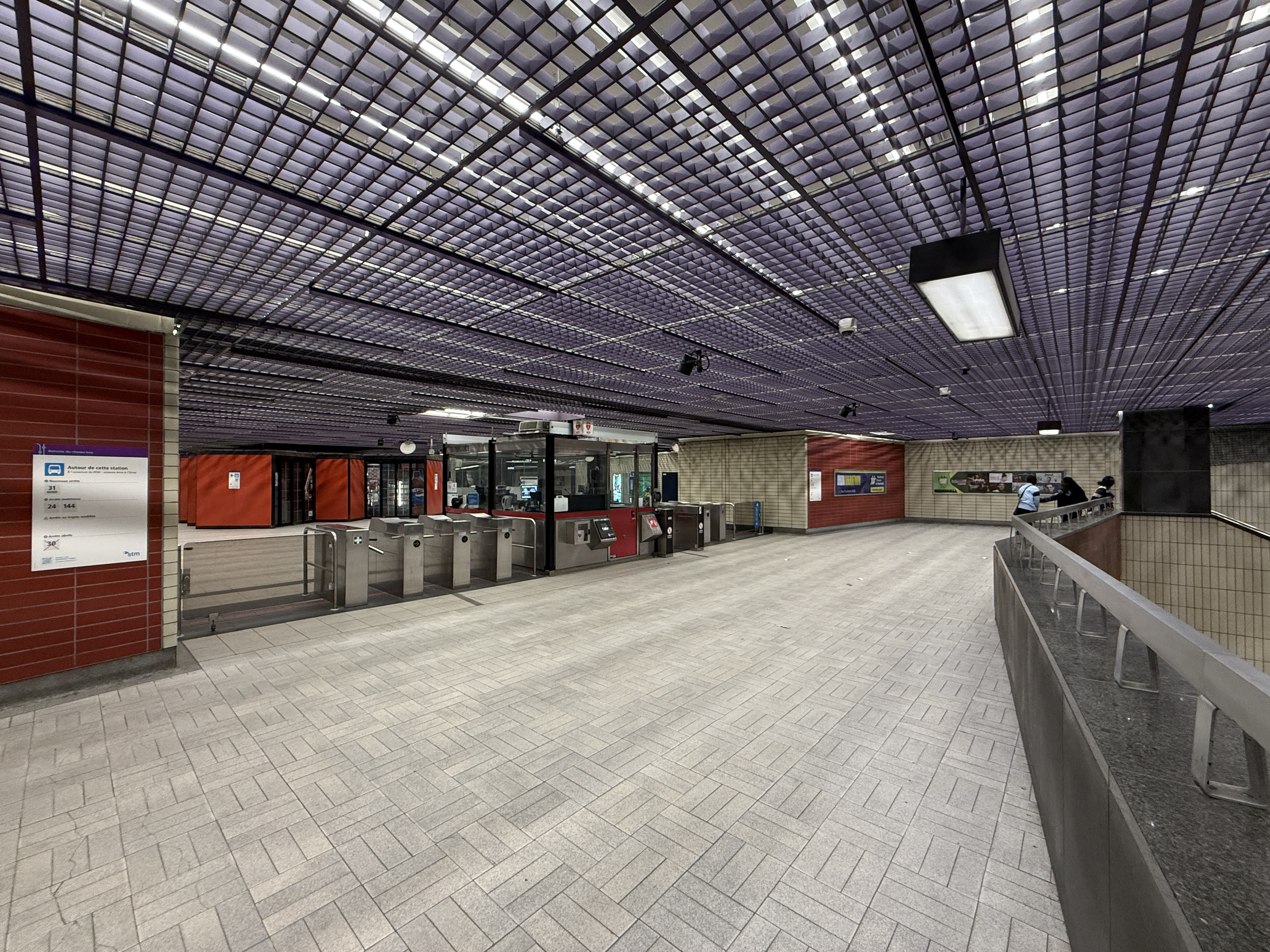
Sherbrooke Metro station concourse

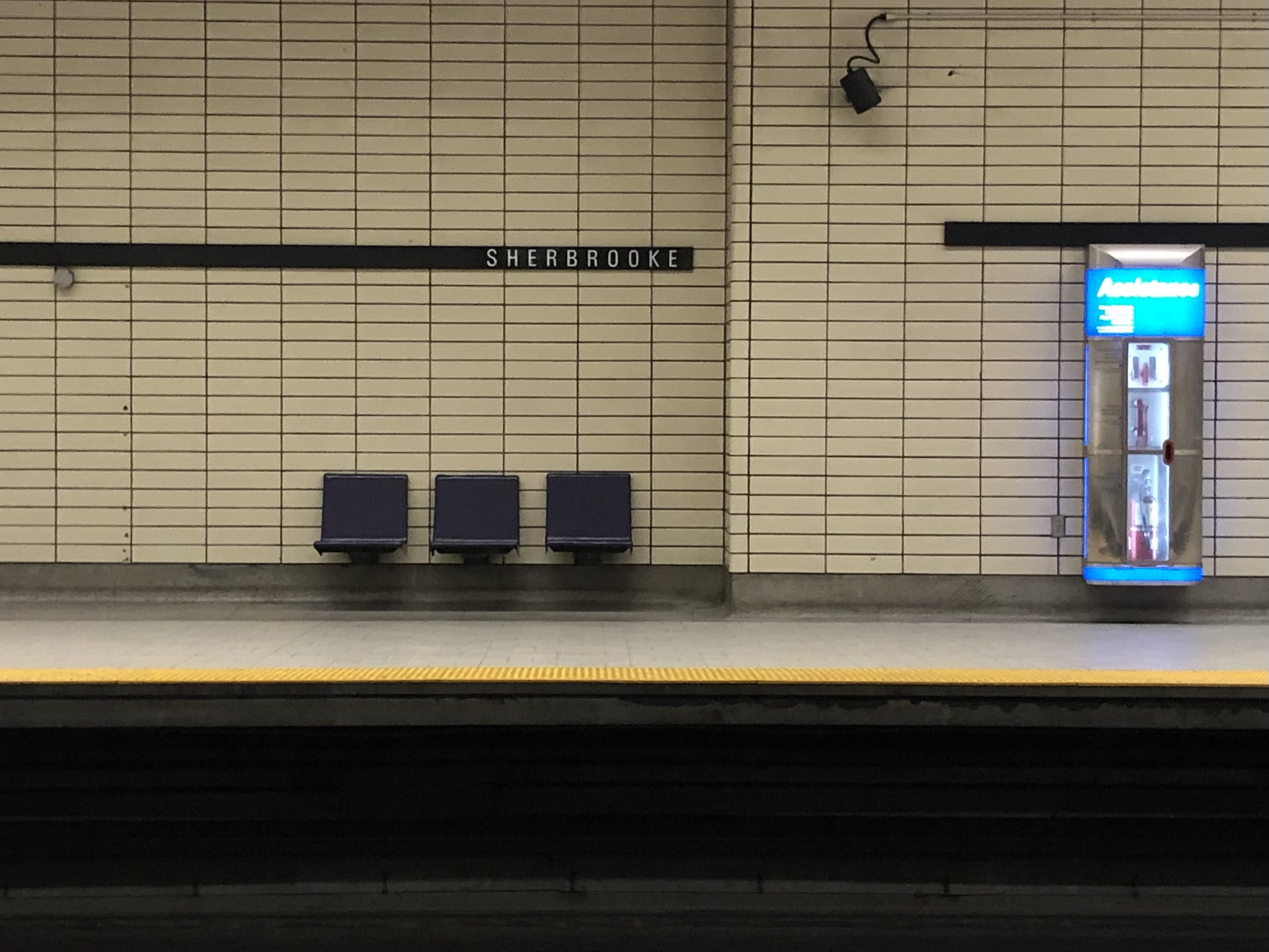
Sherbrooke station seats, on the Côte-Vertu platform.

The station, designed by Jean Dumontier and Crevier, Lemieux, Mercier et Caron, is a normal side-platform station, built in open cut due to the difficulty of construction under Berri Street near the Sherbrooke Street overpass. It has a single mezzanine giving access to two entrances, one on either side of Berri Street, both integrated into buildings. There is an access tunnel that connects the integrated exit to the metro station as well as an exit to Sherbrooke street, the only one in the station. The walls are decorated in straw-yellow brick, purple ceiling louvres and bulkhead walls, and orange highlights.

== Architecture and art ==
The station's main artwork is a mosaic, the only one in the Metro, on the Côte-Vertu platform. Designed by Gabriel Bastien and Andrea Vau, it depicts the achievements of the Saint-Jean-Baptiste Society, whose headquarters are nearby. There are also two mural works by Mario Merola in the accesses.

== Origin of the name ==
This station is named for Sherbrooke Street. Sir John Coape Sherbrooke (1764–1830) served as governor general of British North America 1816–1818. The street was named for him in 1817.

== Connecting bus routes ==
Société de transport de Montréal
No.	Route	Connects to	Service times / notes
24	Sherbrooke	Villa-Maria	Daily
31	Saint-Denis	Henri-Bourassa; Sauvé; Crémazie; Jarry; Jean-Talon; Beaubien; Rosemont; Laurier; Mont-Royal	Daily
144	Des Pins	Atwater	Daily
360 ☾	Des Pins	Frontenac; Atwater	Night service
361 ☾	Saint-Denis	Replaces the Orange Line from Henri-Bourassa to Place-d'Armes	Night service

== Nearby points of interest ==
- Institut de tourisme et d'hôtellerie du Québec
- Parc Lafontaine
- Saint-Louis Square
- Théâtre d'Aujourd'hui
- Théâtre de Quat'Sous
- Hôpital Notre-Dame
- Théâtre La Chapelle
- Prince-Arthur Street
