= Théâtre d'Aujourd'hui =

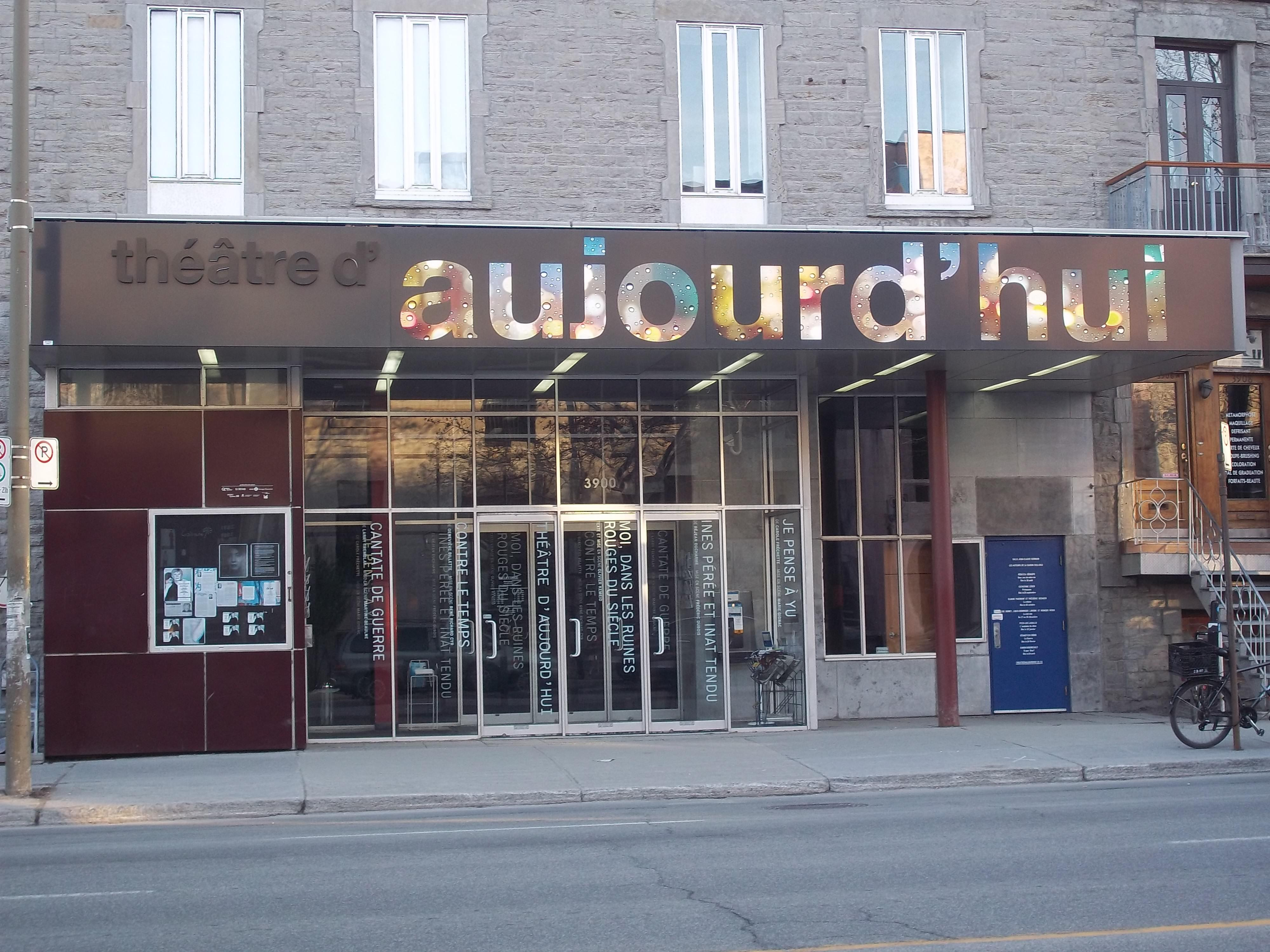
The Théâtre d'Aujourd'hui after its renovation.

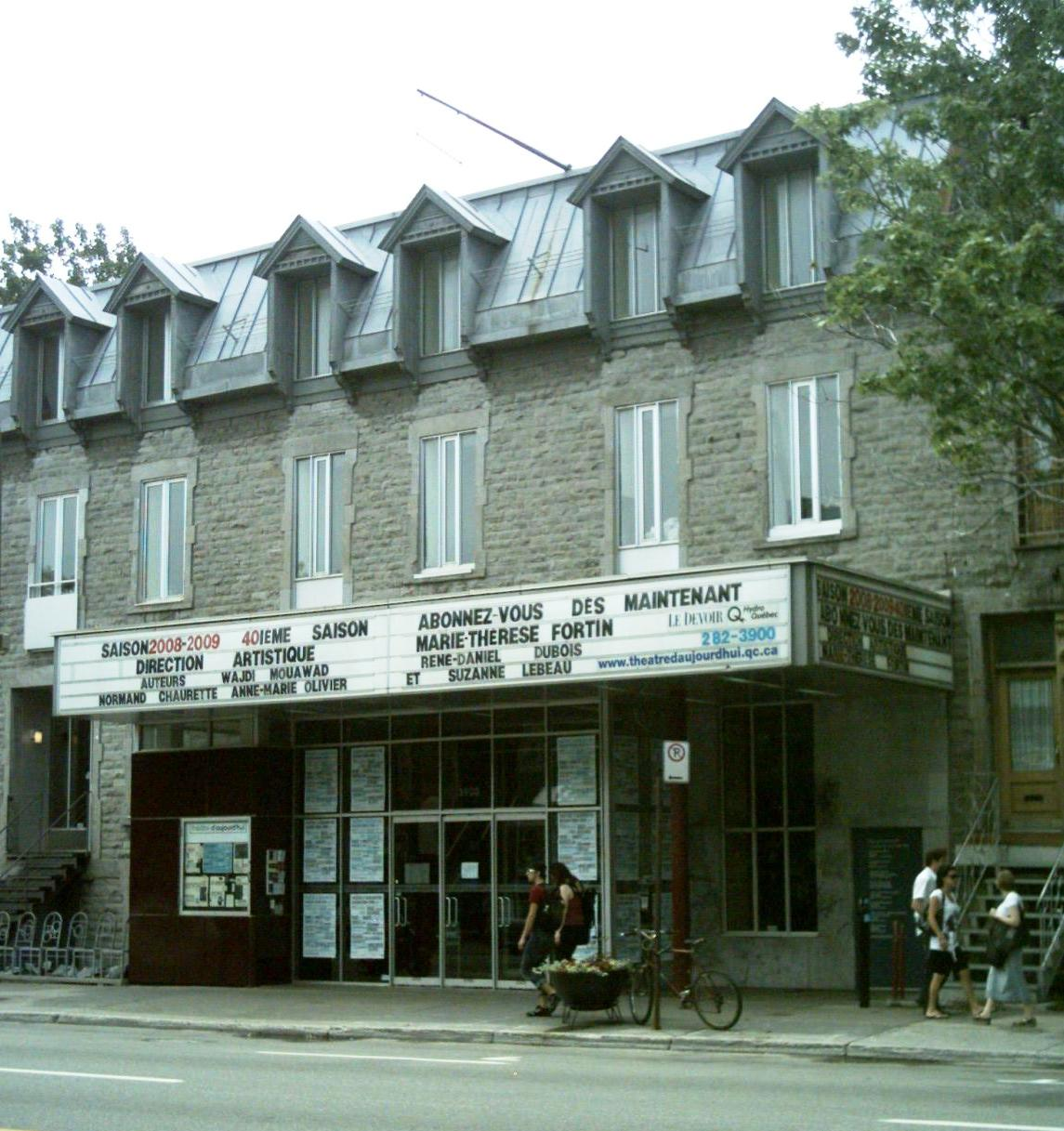
The Théâtre d'Aujourd'hui prior to its renovation.

The Théâtre d'Aujourd'hui is a theater in Montreal, Quebec, Canada. It is located at 3900 Saint Denis Street in the borough of Le Plateau-Mont-Royal. It was founded in 1968, regrouping the product of three semi-professional theater companies: Le Mouvement contemporain (directed by André Brassard), The Tumblers (directed by Rodrig Mathieu) and Les Apprentis-Sorciers (directed by Jean-Pierre Saulnier and Pierre Collin). The Théâtre d'Aujourd'hui is devoted exclusively to the creation, production and dissemination of French-language Quebec and Canadian drama. In 1991 the theater moved to the current location. It has two rooms: the main hall and the smaller Jean-Claude Germain hall upstairs.
