= Sauvé station =

Montreal Metro station

Sauvé
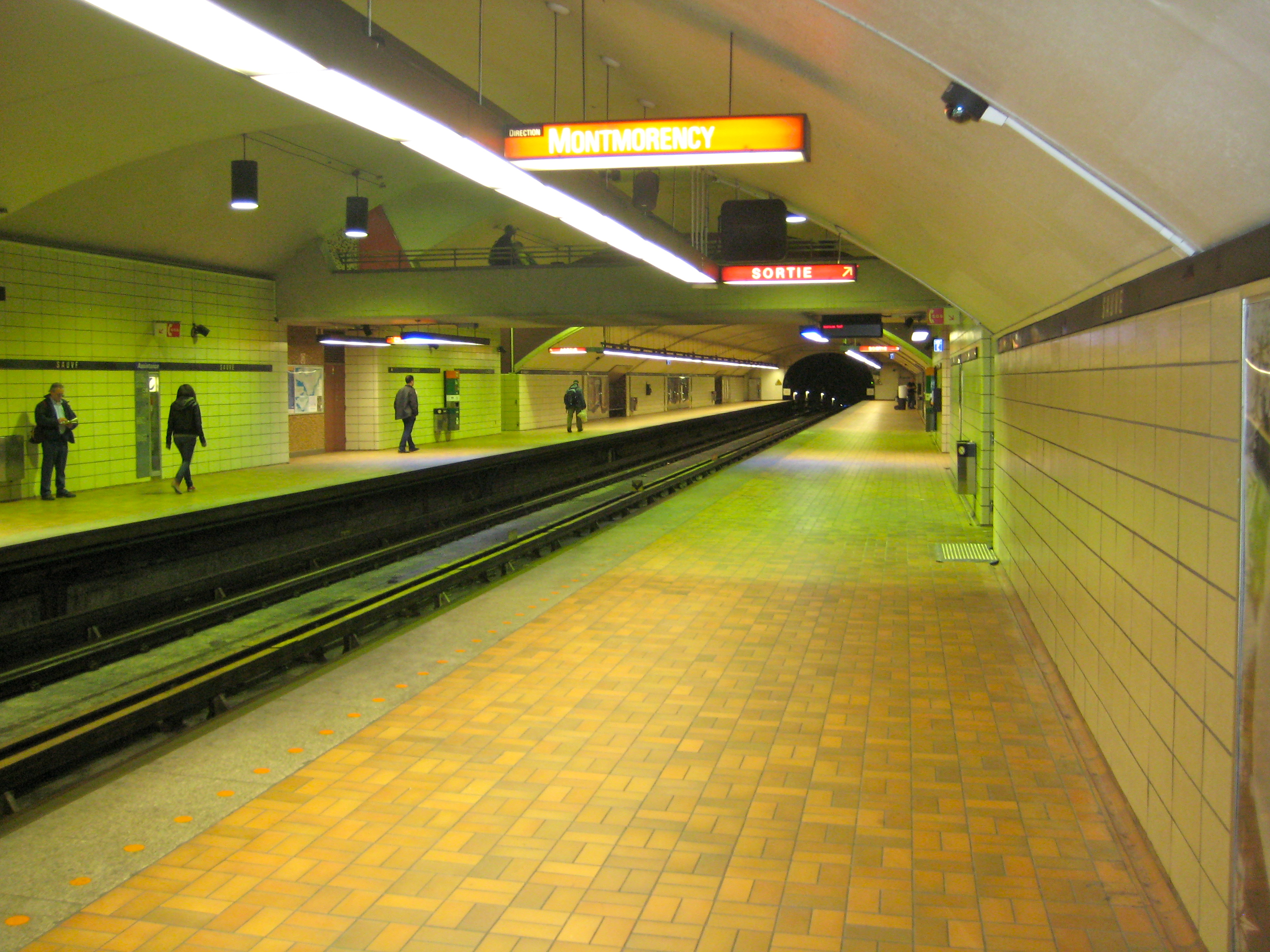

General information
- Location: 9790 and 9800 rue Berri; Montreal, Quebec H3L 2G3; Canada
- Coordinates: 45°33′03″N 73°39′22″W
- Operator: Société de transport de Montréal
- Platforms: 2 side platforms
- Tracks: 2
- Connections: STM bus; Line 15 – Mascouche; Via Rail

Construction
- Depth: 15.9 metres (52 feet 2 inches), 32nd deepest
- Architect: Adalbert Niklewicz

Other information
- Fare zone: ARTM: A

History
- Opened: 14 October 1966

Passengers
- 2024: 3,474,158 ▲9.47%
- Rank: 30 of 68

Services
Preceding station	Montreal Metro	Following station
Crémazie toward Côte-Vertu	Orange Line	Henri-Bourassa toward Montmorency
Location

Sauvé station (French pronunciation: [sove]) is an intermodal transit station in the borough of Ahuntsic-Cartierville in Montreal, Quebec, Canada. The Montreal Metro station is operated by the Société de transport de Montréal (STM) and serves the Orange Line. It is located in the Ahuntsic district. The station opened October 14, 1966, as part of the original network of the Metro.

Just south of the station on Berri Street, is the Canadian National railway line, which carries the Exo commuter rail's Mascouche commuter and Via Rail intercity trains. The commuter rail station is also replaces the nearby Via Rail Ahuntsic station.

== Overview ==
The Metro station, designed by Adalbert Niklewicz, is a normal side platform station, built in tunnel. A single mezzanine connects entrances on either side of Sauvé Street.

In 2022, the STM's Universal Accessibility Report noted that preliminary design work to make the station accessible was underway.

== Origin of the name ==
This station is named for Sauvé Street, named in 1912 for a landowner whose property the street crossed.

== Commuter and intercity rail ==
Sauvé
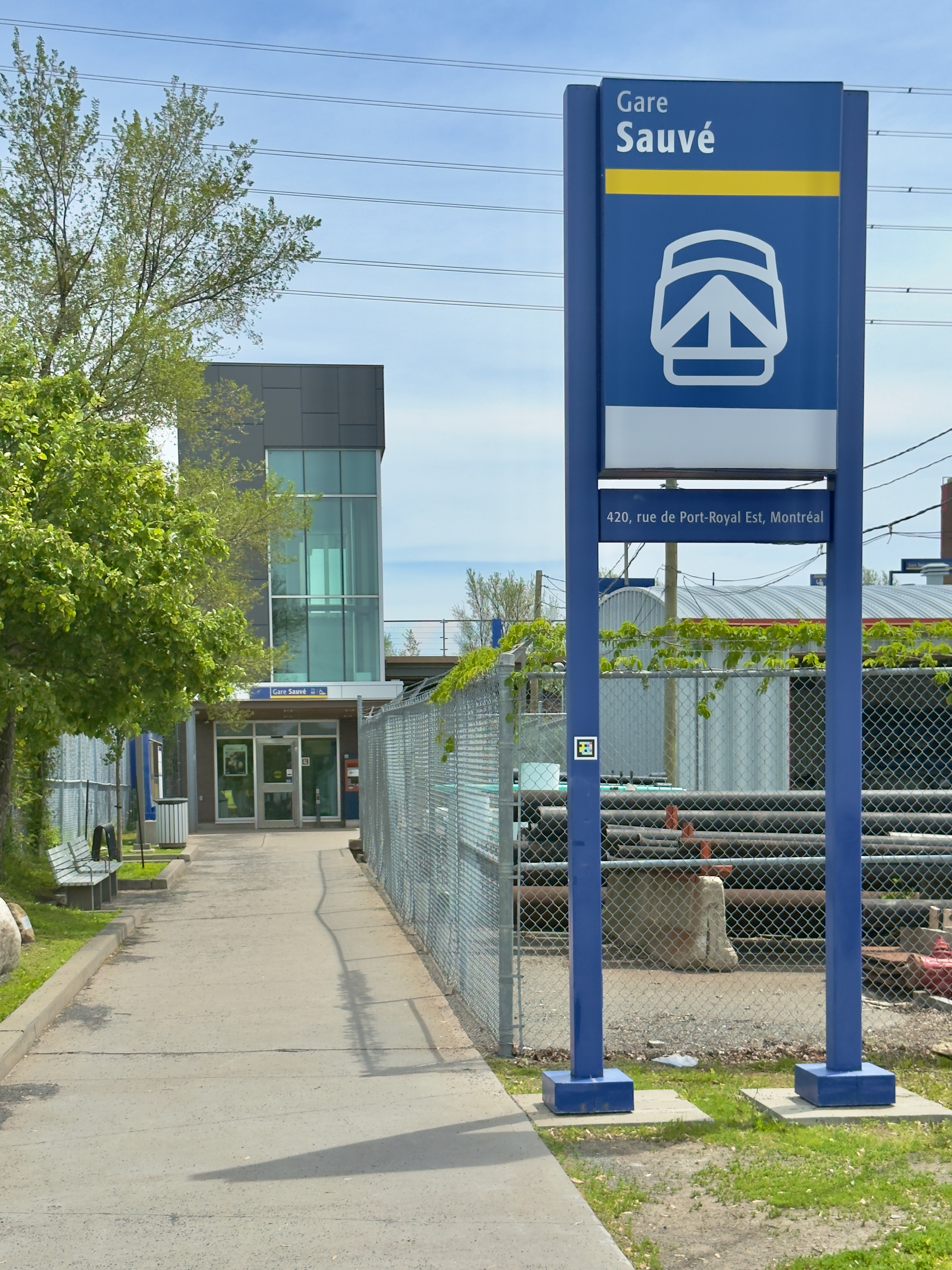
- Port-Royal Street entrance

General information
- Location: 420 Port-Royal Street East; Montreal, Quebec H3L 2B8
- Operator: Exo
- Platforms: 1 side platform
- Tracks: 1
- Connections: Orange Line; STM bus; Via Rail

Construction
- Parking: None
- Cycle facilities: 14 spaces
- Accessible: Yes

Other information
- Fare zone: ARTM: A
- Website: Sauvé station

History
- Opened: July 6, 2015

Passengers
- 2019: 221,800 (Exo)

Services
Preceding station	Via Rail	Following station
Anjou toward Jonquière	Montreal–Jonquière	Montreal Terminus
Anjou toward Senneterre	Montreal–Senneterre	Montreal Terminus
Preceding station	Exo	Following station
Saint-Michel–Montréal-Nord toward Mascouche	Line 15 – Mascouche	Ahuntsic toward Côte-de-Liesse
Former services
Preceding station	Exo	Following station
Before 2020
Saint-Michel–Montréal-Nord toward Mascouche	Line 15 – Mascouche	Ahuntsic toward Montreal
Before 2026
Saint-Michel–Montréal-Nord toward Mascouche	Line 15 – Mascouche	Ahuntsic Terminus
Saint-Michel–Montréal-Nord toward Mascouche	Line 15 – Mascouche Limited service	Ahuntsic toward Montreal
Location

Sauvé station is a commuter rail station operated by Exo.

It is served by the Mascouche line and by Via Rail's Montreal–Jonquière and Montreal–Senneterre trains. Via service was moved to Sauvé from the now-closed Ahuntsic station some 500 metres east of the station (not to be confused with the present-day Ahuntsic commuter train station, to the west).

It is one of five stations in the Exo system with a connection to the Montreal Metro, and is the only such intermodal station besides Gare Centrale/Bonaventure to be served by intercity rail.

== Connecting bus routes ==
Société de transport de Montréal
No.	Route	Connects to	Service times / notes
31	Saint-Denis	Henri-Bourassa; Crémazie; Jarry; Jean-Talon; Beaubien; Rosemont; Laurier; Mont-Royal; Sherbrooke	Daily
41	Saint-Michel / Ahuntsic	Pie-IX BRT; Saint-Michel-Montréal-Nord; Saint-Michel	Weekdays only
121	Sauvé / Côte-Vertu	Côte-Vertu; Montpellier; Ahuntsic	Daily
140	Fleury	Pie-IX BRT; Chabanel; Ahuntsic	Daily
180	De Salaberry	Ahuntsic	Daily
361 ☾	Saint-Denis	Replaces the Orange Line from Henri-Bourassa to Place-d'Armes	Night service
378 ☾	Sauvé / YUL Aéroport	Montpellier; Côte-Vertu; Du Collège; Dorval	Night service Connects to Montréal–Trudeau International Airport
440	Express Charleroi	Saint-Michel-Montréal-Nord; Pie-IX BRT; Saint-Léonard-Montréal-Nord	Weekdays, peak only

== Nearby points of interest ==
- Chevra Kadisha-B'nai Jacob Congregation Cemetery
- Shaare Zion congregation Cemetery
- Henri Julien Park
- Auteuil Park
