= Crémazie station =

Montreal Metro station

Crémazie
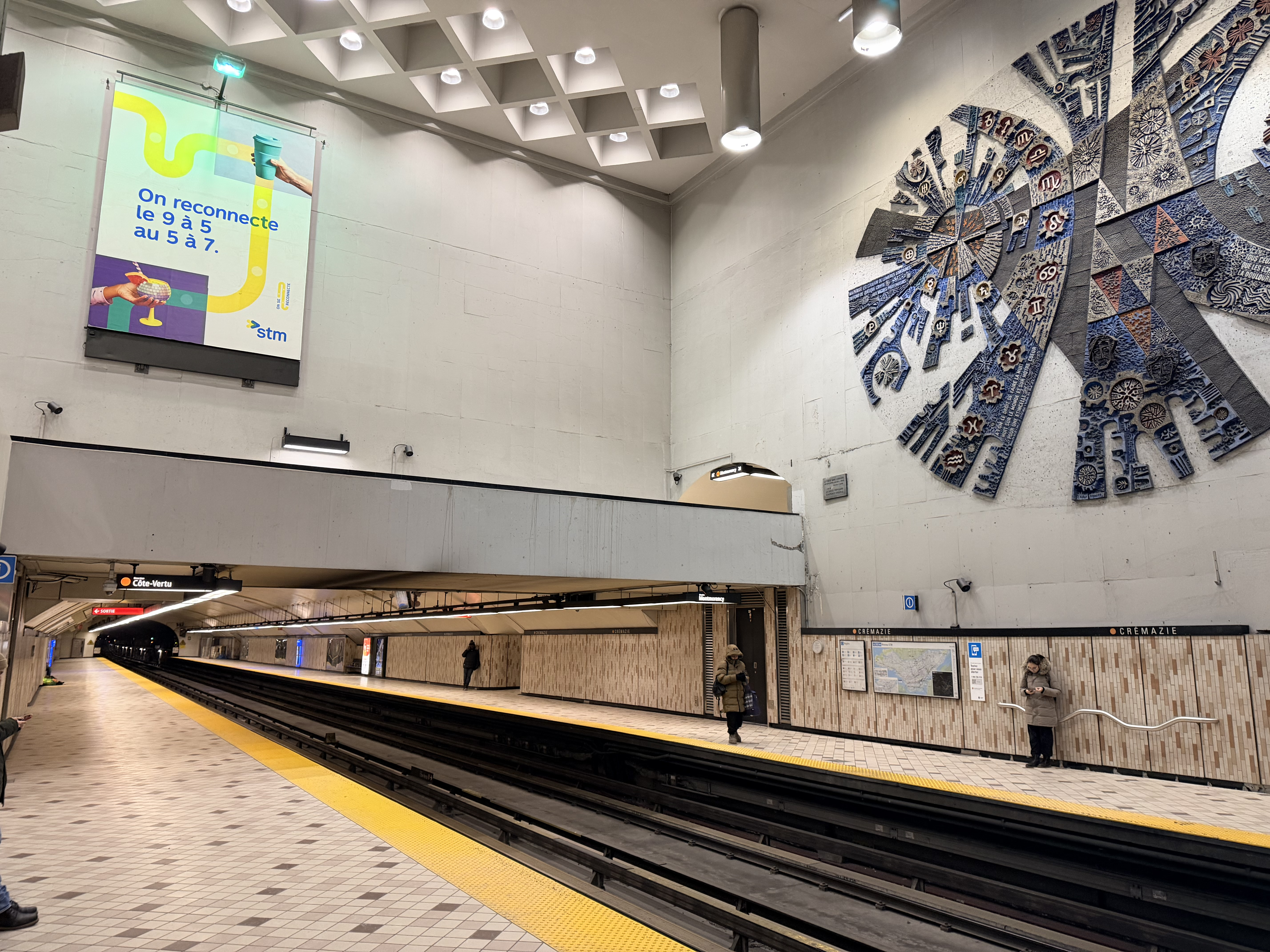

General information
- Location: 490 and 505, boul. Crémazie; Montreal, Quebec H2P 1E6; Canada
- Coordinates: 45°32′46″N 73°38′18″W
- Operator: Société de transport de Montréal
- Platforms: 2 side platforms
- Tracks: 2
- Connections: STM bus

Construction
- Depth: 16.8 metres (55 feet 1 inch), 27th deepest
- Accessible: No
- Architect: Adalbert Niklewicz

Other information
- Fare zone: ARTM: A

History
- Opened: 14 October 1966

Passengers
- 2024: 3,523,727 ▲6.15%
- Rank: 28 of 68

Services
Preceding station	Montreal Metro	Following station
Jarry toward Côte-Vertu	Orange Line	Sauvé toward Montmorency
Location

Crémazie station (French pronunciation: [kʁemazi]) is a Montreal Metro station in Montreal, Quebec, Canada. It is operated by the Société de transport de Montréal (STM) and serves the Orange Line. It is located on the border between the boroughs of Ahuntsic-Cartierville and Villeray–Saint-Michel–Parc-Extension The station opened October 14, 1966, as part of the original Metro network.

== Overview ==
The station, designed by Adalbert Niklewicz, is a normal side platform station, built in tunnel. A large volume serves as the transept, with three of the four platform stairways in enclosed tunnels. The mezzanine serves two entrances, one on each side of the Autoroute Métropolitaine, and both integrated into buildings; the northern access has doors both in front of and behind the building.

A large ceramic mural by Georges Lauda, Paul Pannier, and Gérard Cordeau, Le poète dans l'univers ("the poet in the universe"), is located on the wall of the large volume, over the Montmorency platform. It commemorates three famous Quebec poets, Octave Crémazie, Émile Nelligan, and Hector de Saint-Denys Garneau, represented by wrought iron masks on the mural.

== Origin of the name ==
This station is named for Crémazie Boulevard, in turn commemorating Octave Crémazie (1827–1879), one of Quebec's most important poets and the author of "Le Drapeau de Carillon." The street was so named in 1914.

== Connecting bus routes ==
Société de transport de Montréal
No.	Route	Connects to	Service times / notes
20	Crémazie / Marché Central	Chabanel; Ahuntsic	Daily
31	Saint-Denis	Henri-Bourassa; Sauvé; Jarry; Jean-Talon; Beaubien; Rosemont; Laurier; Mont-Royal; Sherbrooke	Daily
52	De Liège		Weekdays, peak only
54	Charland / Chabanel	Chabanel; Ahuntsic; Côte-de-Liesse	Daily
100	Crémazie	Du Collège (westbound only); De La Savane (eastbound only)	Daily
192	Robert	Pie-IX BRT	Daily
361 ☾	Saint-Denis	Replaces the Orange Line from Henri-Bourassa to Place-d'Armes	Night service
460	Express Métropolitaine	De La Savane (eastbound); Du Collège (westbound); Dorval	Weekdays only Certain trips start or end at Montréal-Trudeau International Airport

== Nearby points of interest ==
- Complexe FTQ
- Collège Ahuntsic
- Collège André-Grasset
- Complexe sportif Claude-Robillard
- Centre Rockland
