= Mont-Royal station (Montreal Metro) =

Montreal Metro station

Mont-Royal

General information
- Location: 470, av. du Mont-Royal Est; Montreal, Quebec H2J 1W4; Canada
- Coordinates: 45°31′28″N 73°34′54″W
- Operator: Société de transport de Montréal
- Platforms: 2 side platforms
- Tracks: 2
- Connections: STM bus

Construction
- Depth: 13.4 metres (44 feet), 39th deepest
- Accessible: Yes
- Architect: Victor Prus

Other information
- Fare zone: ARTM: A

History
- Opened: 14 October 1966
- Rebuilt: 2018–22

Passengers
- 2024: 4,965,189 ▲6.16%
- Rank: 13 of 68

Services
Preceding station	Montreal Metro	Following station
Sherbrooke toward Côte-Vertu	Orange Line	Laurier toward Montmorency
Location

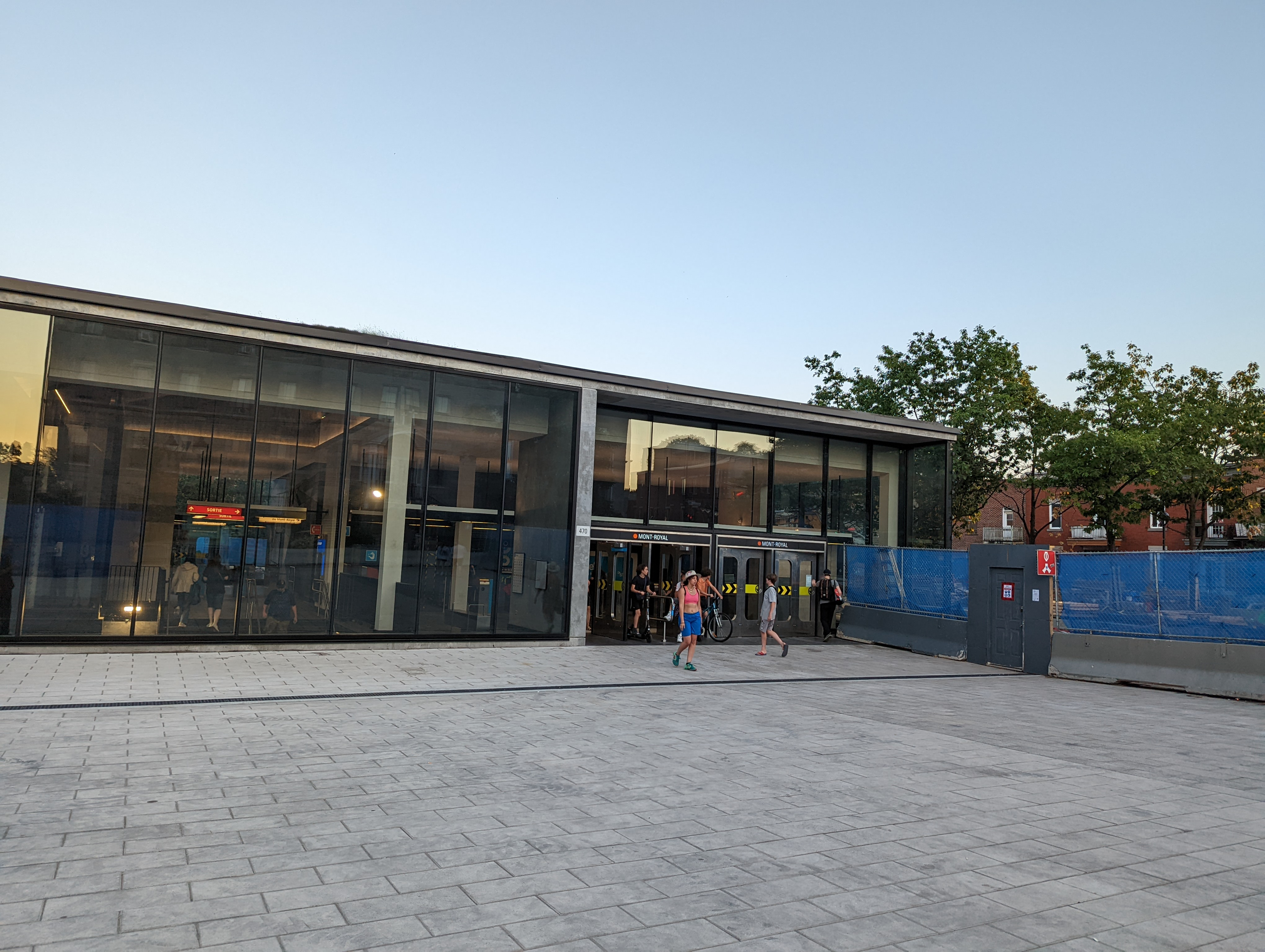
Exterior of the station

Mont-Royal (French pronunciation: [mɔ̃ ʁwajal]) is a station on the Orange Line of the Montreal Metro rapid transit system, operated by the Société de transport de Montréal (STM). It is located in the Plateau-Mont-Royal borough in Montreal, Quebec, Canada. The station opened on October 14, 1966, as part of the original network of the Metro.

== Overview ==
The station, designed by Victor Prus, is a normal side platform station, built in tunnel. It has a single mezzanine at transept level, giving access to one entrance.

== Artwork ==
The station has several pieces of artwork. Vertical bands by noted Quebec artist Charles Daudelin consists of 32 narrow vertical aluminum seams at platform level, with extruded square and rectangular forms in high relief. These were some of the first artworks installed in the Metro, present at the opening of the station in 1966. In 2000, the redevelopment of the place Gérald-Godin surrounding the station included the addition of a work of art, a poem by Gérald Godin bricked into the façade of a building, by the art collective Les Industries perdues. In 2022, Je reviens chez nous by artist Simon Bilodeau was installed in the newly rebuilt east entrance. This concrete work represents the limestone strata of the Plateau-Mont-Royal and the various streets & avenues.

== Origin of the name ==
This station is named for Mount Royal Avenue (av. Mont-Royal), so called because it leads to the foot of Mount Royal.

== Accessibility ==
In October 2018, work began to install two elevators, add two staircases connecting the platforms to the street and build a second walkway above the tracks linking the two platforms. The work also involved construction of a replacement entrance building, with a glass façade and new artwork. A walkway provides access between the two elevators, and the fare booth and ticket machines have been relocated to the street level.

In July 2022, the station became the 20th accessible station on the Metro. Escalators at the station reopened in fall 2022, completing the project.

== Connecting bus routes ==
Société de transport de Montréal
No.	Route	Connects to	Service times / notes
11	Parc du Mont-Royal	Côte-des-Neiges	Daily Occasional departures to Ridgewood throughout the day. All departures serve Ridgewood after 9:30 PM.
31	Saint-Denis	Henri-Bourassa; Sauvé; Crémazie; Jarry; Jean-Talon; Beaubien; Rosemont; Laurier; Sherbrooke	Daily
97	Avenue-du-Mont-Royal	Pie-IX BRT; Pie-IX	Daily
361 ☾	Saint-Denis	Replaces the Orange Line from Henri-Bourassa to Place-d'Armes	Night service
711	Parc du Mont-Royal / Oratoire	Snowdon	Runs 7 days a week during the summer and weekends only the rest of the year

== Nearby points of interest ==
- Mount Royal Park
- Saint Denis Street
- Maison de la culture et bibliothèque Mont-Royal
- Centre communautaire Projet Changement
