= Charlevoix station (Montreal Metro) =

Montreal Metro station

Charlevoix
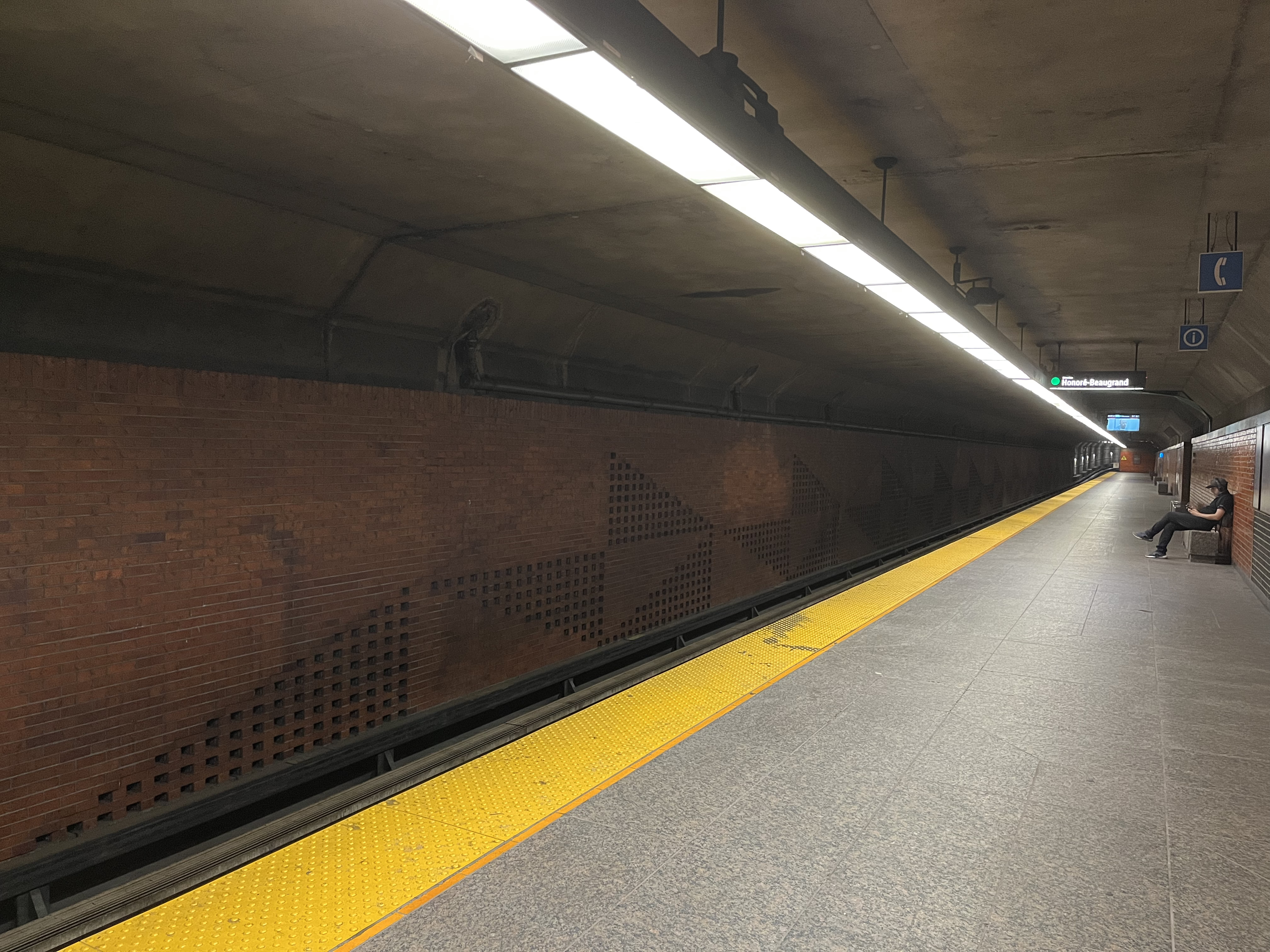
- The station in 2023

General information
- Location: 2600, Centre Street; Montreal, Quebec H3K 1K1; Canada
- Coordinates: 45°28′42″N 73°34′10″W
- Operator: Société de transport de Montréal
- Platforms: 2 split platforms
- Tracks: 2
- Connections: STM bus

Construction
- Depth: 24.4 metres (80 feet), towards Angrignon (upper platform); 29.6 metres (97 feet), towards Honoré-Beaugrand (lower platform; deepest platform on the Metro network)
- Accessible: No
- Architect: Ayotte et Bergeron

Other information
- Fare zone: ARTM: A

History
- Opened: 3 September 1978

Passengers
- 2024: 1,632,172 ▲7.03%
- Rank: 55 of 68

Services
Preceding station	Montreal Metro	Following station
LaSalle toward Angrignon	Green Line	Lionel-Groulx toward Honoré-Beaugrand
Location

Charlevoix station (French pronunciation: [ʃaʁləvwa]) is a Montreal Metro station in the borough of Le Sud-Ouest in Montreal, Quebec, Canada. It is operated by the Société de transport de Montréal (STM) and serves the Green Line. It is located in the district of Pointe-Saint-Charles. It opened on September 3, 1978, as part of the extension of the Green Line westward to Angrignon station.

== Architecture and art ==
Station Charlevoix artwork near escalator

Designed by Ayotte et Bergeron, it was built as a stacked platform station, in order to reduce the width of the station owing to the weak Utica Shale in which it was built. The lower (Honoré-Beaugrand) platform is 29.6 m (97 ft) below the surface, making this the deepest station in the network, as well as the lowest in altitude (the lower platform is below sea level).

The station has one ticket hall and one access. The long stairways to the platforms, built around a light shaft, are brightened by two stained-glass windows by Mario Merola and Pierre Osterrath.

== Origin of the name ==
This station is named for rue Charlevoix. Pierre François Xavier de Charlevoix (1682–1761) was a French Jesuit historian and explorer of New France.

== Connecting bus routes ==
The buses at Charlevoix use its bus loop which is under an OMHM apartment building.

Société de transport de Montréal
No.	Route	Connects to	Service times / notes
57	Charlevoix	Georges-Vanier; Atwater	Daily
61	Wellington	De L'Église; LaSalle; Bonaventure	Daily Some rush hour services start and end at this station

== Nearby points of interest ==
- Centre Saint-Charles
- St. Columba House
- Clinique communautaire de Pointe-Saint-Charles
- Carrefour d'éducation publique
- Parc du Canal-de-Lachine
- Maison Saint-Gabriel
