= Laurier station (Montreal Metro) =

Montreal Metro station

Laurier
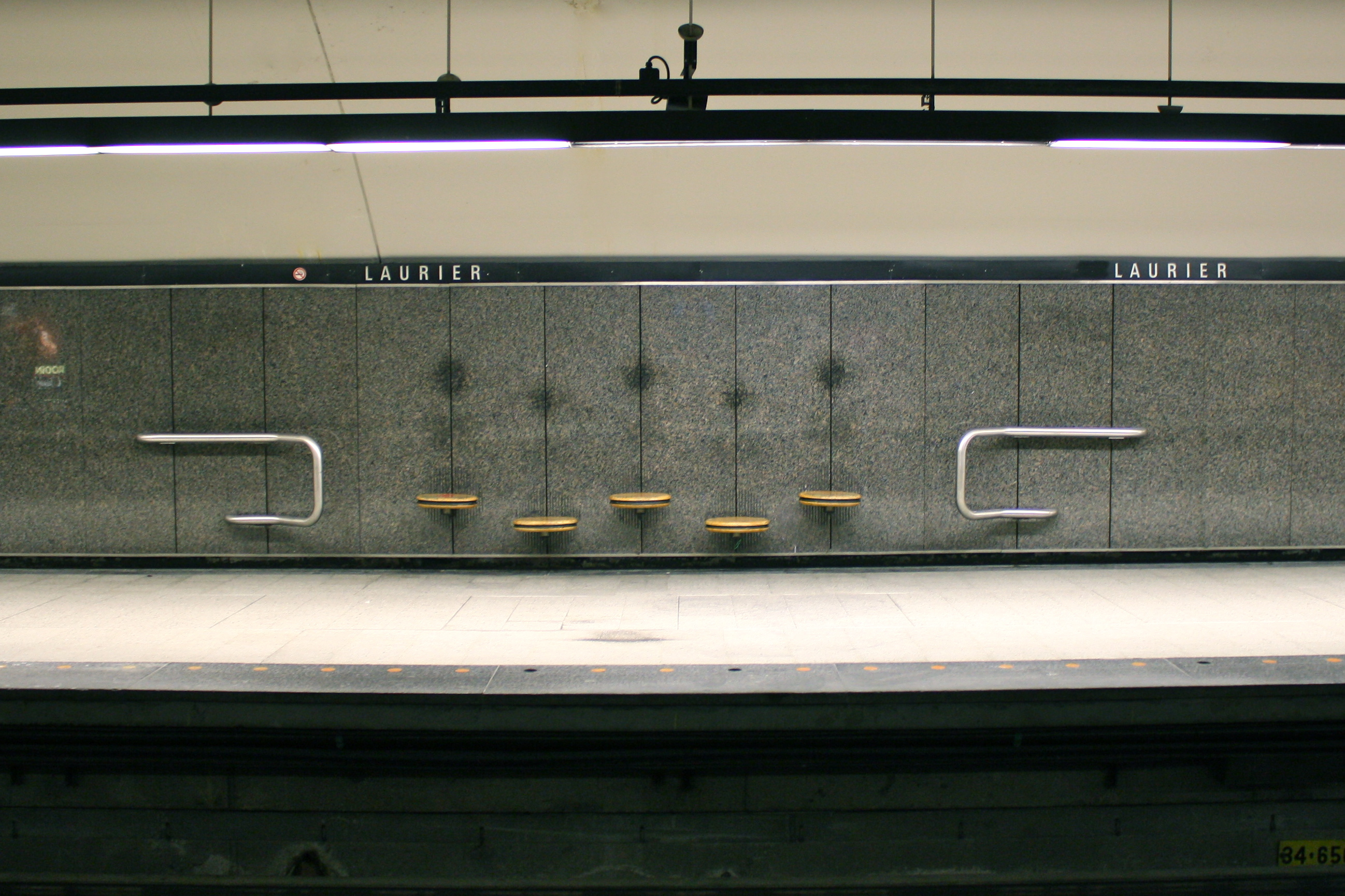

General information
- Location: 495, Gilford Street; Montreal, Quebec H2J 1N4; Canada
- Coordinates: 45°31′38″N 73°35′12″W
- Operator: Société de transport de Montréal
- Platforms: 2 side platforms
- Tracks: 2
- Connections: STM bus

Construction
- Depth: 10.7 metres (35 feet 1 inch), 48th deepest
- Accessible: No
- Architect: Jean P. Pothier

Other information
- Fare zone: ARTM: A

History
- Opened: 14 October 1966

Passengers
- 2024: 3,955,087 ▲6.2%
- Rank: 22 of 68

Services
Preceding station	Montreal Metro	Following station
Mont-Royal toward Côte-Vertu	Orange Line	Rosemont toward Montmorency
Location

Laurier station (French pronunciation: [loʁje]) is a Montreal Metro station in the borough of Le Plateau-Mont-Royal in Montreal, Quebec, Canada. It is operated by the Société de transport de Montréal (STM) and serves the Orange Line. It is located just to the east of the Mile End neighbourhood. The station opened on October 14, 1966, as part of the original network of the Metro.

== Overview ==
The station, designed by Jean P. Pothier, is a normal side platform station, built in tunnel. It has a mezzanine and an entrance at either end, the southern one incorporating an open sided bus shelter, and the northern one including an automatic ticket barrier.

The walls are decorated in grey granite, with orange and red tiles at both ends of the platform.

== Origin of the name ==
This station is named for Laurier Avenue, named for Sir Wilfrid Laurier (1841–1919), the first French-Canadian Prime Minister of Canada (1896–1911).

== Connecting bus routes ==
Société de transport de Montréal
No.	Route	Connects to	Service times / notes
14	Atateken	Beaudry; Champ-de-Mars	Daily
27	Saint-Joseph	Pie-IX BRT	Daily
31	Saint-Denis	Henri-Bourassa; Sauvé; Crémazie; Jarry; Jean-Talon; Beaubien; Rosemont; Mont-Royal; Sherbrooke	Daily
47	Masson	Pie-IX BRT	Daily
51	Édouard-Montpetit	Édouard-Montpetit; Université-de-Montréal; Snowdon; Montréal-Ouest	Daily Some rush hour services start and end at Snowdon metro
119	Rockland	Université-de-Montréal; Édouard-Montpetit; Ville-de-Mont-Royal	Daily
361 ☾	Saint-Denis	Replaces the Orange Line from Henri-Bourassa to Place-d'Armes	Night service

== Nearby points of interest ==
- École nationale de théâtre
- École supérieure de la danse du Québec
- Plaza Laurier
- Parc Sir-Wilfrid-Laurier
- CLSC Saint-Louis-du-Parc

== Film and television appearances ==
Laurier station appeared in the 2018 Denys Arcand movie The Fall of the American Empire (French: "La chute de l'empire américain").
