= Le Plateau-Mont-Royal =

- Borough of Montreal
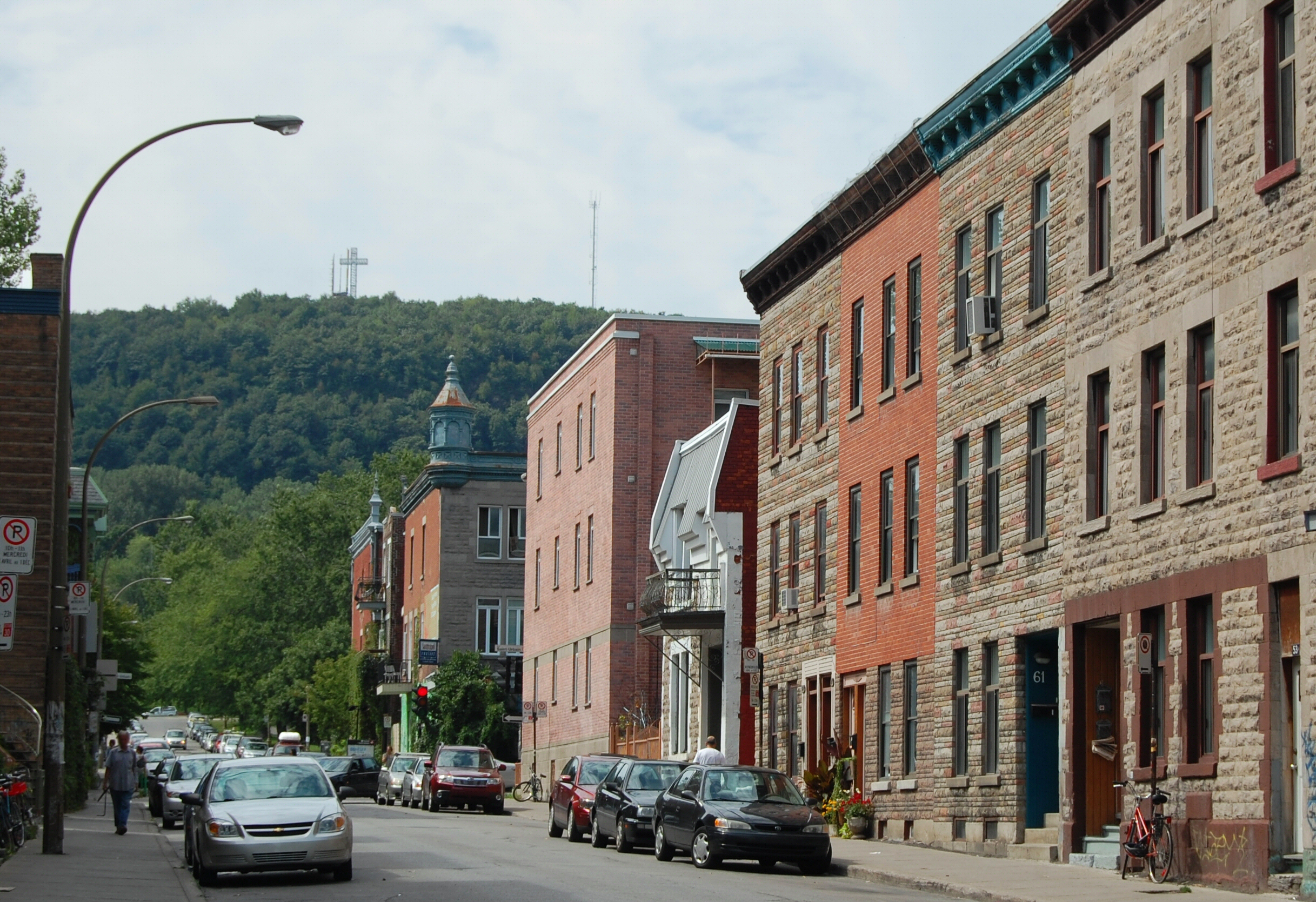
- Mount Royal seen from Duluth Street in the Plateau.

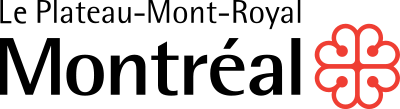

- Le Plateau-Mont-Royal's location in Montreal
- Coordinates: 45°31′18″N 73°34′32″W
- Country: Canada
- Province: Quebec
- City: Montreal
- Region: Montréal
- Borough established: January 1, 2002
- Electoral Districts Federal: Laurier—Sainte-Marie; Outremont; Ville-Marie—Le Sud-Ouest—Île-des-Sœurs
- Provincial: Mercier; Mont-Royal-Outremont; Sainte-Marie–Saint-Jacques; Westmount–Saint-Louis

Government
  - Type: Borough
  - Mayor: Cathy Wong (PM)
  - Federal MP(s): Steven Guilbeault (LIB); Marc Miller (LIB); Rachel Bendayan (LIB)
  - Quebec MNA(s): Ruba Ghazal (QS); Pierre Arcand (PLQ); Manon Massé (QS); Jennifer Maccarone (PLQ)

Area
  - Land: 8.1 km^{2} (3.1 sq mi)

Population (2021)
  - Total: 105,813
  - Density: 13,063.3/km^{2} (33,834/sq mi)
  - Dwellings: 56,730
- Time zone: UTC−5 (Eastern (EST))
  - Summer (DST): UTC−4 (EDT)
- Postal code(s): H2H, H2J, H2K, H2L, H2T, H2W, H2X
- Area codes: (514) and (438)
- Access Routes: R-335
- Website: https://montreal.ca/le-plateau-mont-royal

Le Plateau-Mont-Royal (French pronunciation: [lə plato mɔ̃ ʁwajal]) is a borough (arrondissement) of the city of Montreal, Quebec, Canada.

The borough takes its name from its location on a plateau, on the eastern side of Mount Royal and overlooking downtown Montreal, across its southern border. The borough is bordered to the south by Sherbrooke Street, to the north and north-east by the Canadian Pacific Railway tracks, and to the west by Hutchison (north of Mount Royal Avenue), Park Avenue (between Mount Royal and Pine Avenue) and University Street (south of Pine Avenue). It is one of the most densely populated boroughs in Canada, with 105,813 people living in an 8.1 square kilometre (3¼ sq. mi.) area.

There is a difference between the borough named Plateau-Mont-Royal (which is a political division of the City of Montreal) and the neighbourhood referred to as the Plateau. The borough includes not only the Plateau neighbourhood itself, but also the neighbourhoods of Mile End (bounded by Avenue du Mont-Royal to the south and the Avenue Henri-Julien to the east) and Milton Park (bounded by University, Sherbrooke, Saint-Laurent and Pine). The latter two neighbourhoods are generally considered to be distinct from the Plateau neighbourhood.

The Plateau is famous for being a major centre for the arts, with a large concentration of artists, musicians and creative organizations. Many artistic institutions are established in the Plateau, including the National Theatre School of Canada, the Quebec Conservatory of Music in Montreal, Les Grands Ballets Canadiens and many theatres (such as le Rideau vert, le Théâtre de Quat'Sous, La Licorne and le Théâtre d'Aujourd'hui). The Plateau has many parks, including Jeanne-Mance park, La Fontaine park, Sir-Wilfrid-Laurier park, Saint-Louis Square and Gérald-Godin plaza. Mount Royal Park is also accessible from the Plateau-Mont-Royal.

Due to its large concentration of French immigrants who arrived in the early twenty first century, the neighbourhood has been named the "French District", "Le Petit Paris", "La Petite-France", or ironically "La Nouvelle-France".

== History ==
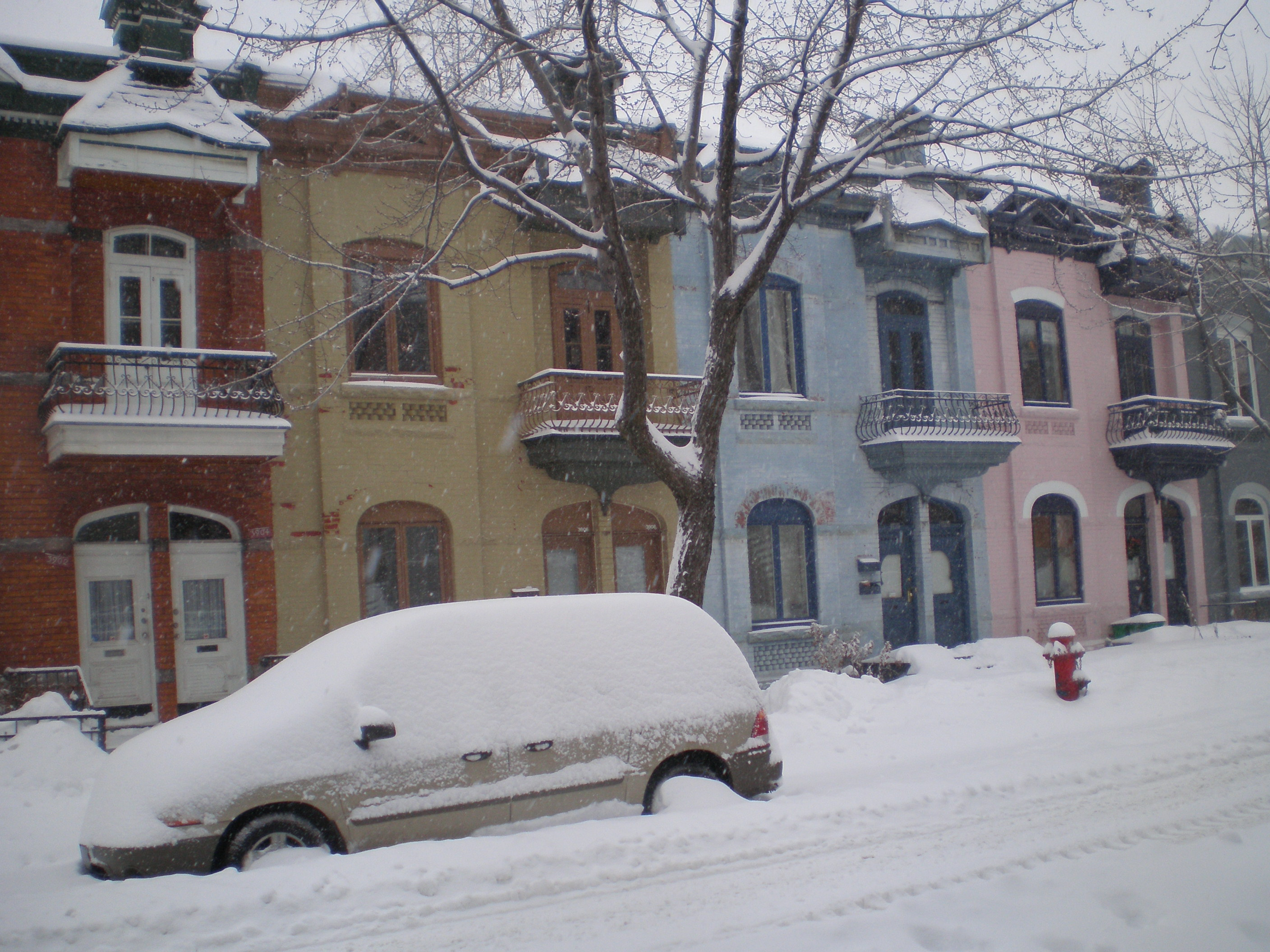
Typical residential street in the Plateau.

Starting in 1745, the urbanized area of Montreal began to extend beyond its fortifications. The Plateau-Mont-Royal was born when the Faubourg Saint-Laurent to the north became the main area of development. In 1792, Montreal expanded, with new official limits about two kilometres (1¼ miles) beyond the original fortifications. Mount Royal and Duluth Street formed its new boundaries. Farther from the centre, especially to the west, English-speaking families of the era owned large houses surrounded by gardens, and the Religious Hospitallers of St. Joseph owned a large field which would later become the site of the future Hôtel-Dieu. Even further from the city were large country estates whose farms were owned by the Montreal bourgeoisie.

In 1850, a reservoir was installed in what is today the location of Saint-Louis Square. Its function was to supply water to Côte-à-Baron residents, who lived on the downward slope below Sherbrooke Street. At that time, a farm on the site of the current La Fontaine Park was converted into grounds for military exercises. To the north, other cities were formed following new economic activity, giving rise to the village of Coteau-Saint-Louis in 1846. A chapel was built two years later, then replaced in 1857 by the Church of Saint-Enfant-Jésus du Mile-End. Nowadays, the Mile End is a neighbourhood adjacent to the Plateau-Mont-Royal borough, but it was only in 1878 that the village of Saint-Louis-du-Mile-End was born. By the end of the century, the mountain was purchased by the City of Montreal and developed into Mount Royal Park. La Fontaine Park took the place of the military field and the reservoir Côte-à-Baron became the Saint-Louis Square.

The village of Saint-Jean-Baptiste took shape circa 1861. Its central point was also the location of its market (the first market was built in 1870 and replaced by a more modern market in 1933, which was demolished in 1966). The civic centre was located at the intersection of Saint Lawrence Street (later Saint Laurent Boulevard) and Rachel Street. The villages of Coteau-Saint-Louis and Saint-Jean-Baptiste merged into Montreal in 1893 and 1886 respectively. As for Saint-Louis-du-Mile-End and DeLorimier, they would be annexed to Montreal in 1910 and 1909 respectively. At that time, the population of Montreal spilled over east of Papineau Road (today Papineau Avenue), where elegant houses and avenues were located.

In the early twentieth century, it was a working class neighbourhood. Over the years, spurred by economic growth, the working class population gradually deserted the area. By 1900, Coteau-Saint-Louis had become very cosmopolitan, and included several Protestant churches and synagogues. Several Protestant traders opened shop on St. Lawrence Street (renamed St. Lawrence Boulevard in 1905). St. Lawrence was the linguistic border between the French-speaking east, and English-speaking west. At that time, Saint Joseph Boulevard became the first tree-lined street in the city.

In the 1930s, the Great Depression slowed construction in the district, although some work resulted in the funding for the landscaping of Sir Wilfrid Laurier Park. The Université de Montréal moved to the northern slope of Mount Royal in 1943, resulting in the relocation of both the English and French bourgeoisie to this neighbourhood. Immigrants settled increasingly in the neighbourhood in the post-war period. Jews operated several boutiques on St. Lawrence Boulevard and moved into the adjacent neighbourhoods to the west. Schwartz's Montreal Hebrew Delicatessen, established in 1928, is still one of the most famous shops in Montreal, renowned for its Montreal-style smoked meat sandwiches. Greek Canadians set up many businesses in the decades that followed, particularly along Park Avenue and contributed to the local art of baking and pastry. More recently, Vietnamese and Portuguese settled in the area, as evidenced, for the latter, by Little Portugal.

Since the 1980s, the area's bohemian aura and proximity to McGill University attracted young professionals, artists, and students. As rents increased, many of its traditional residents and businesses were dispersed to other parts of the city. The neighbourhood continues to gentrify, and it is now home to many upscale restaurants and nightclubs, and several trendy clothing stores are located along Saint-Laurent Boulevard and Saint-Denis Street.

== Geography ==
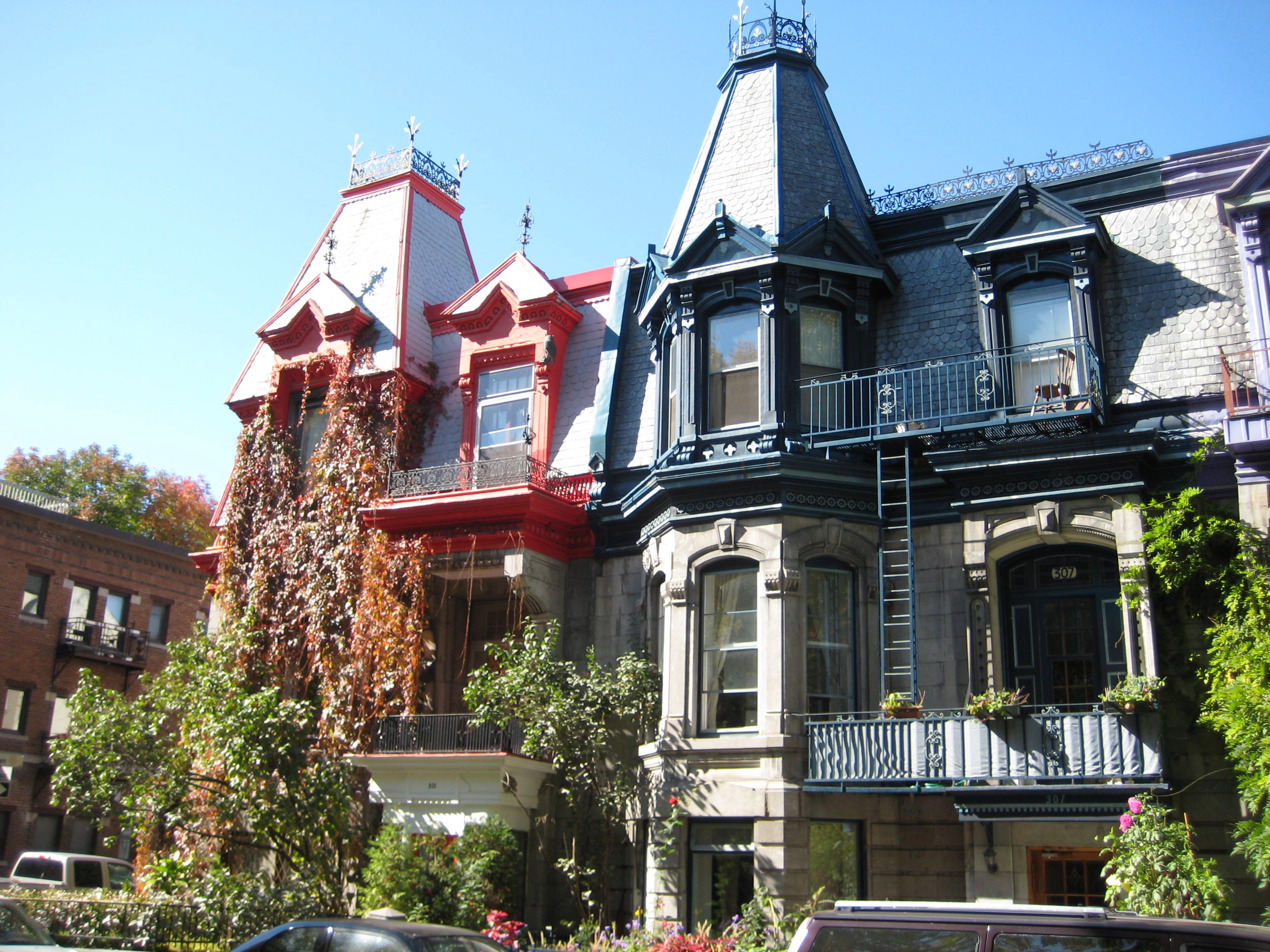
Victorian houses on Saint Louis Square.

The borough is located northeast of downtown, and was part of the City of Montreal prior to the 2002 municipal mergers.

It is bordered to the south by Ville-Marie, to the west by Outremont, and to the north and east by Rosemont–La Petite-Patrie. Clockwise from the south, it is bounded by Sherbrooke St., University St., Pine Ave. (av. des Pins), Park Ave. (Avenue du Parc), the southward projection of Hutchison St., Hutchison St., and the CP railway tracks.

== Arts and culture ==
The Plateau began as a bourgeois community with parts of its extensions as working-class developing around the beginning of the 20th century; the Eastern part being largely Québécois, and the Western part primarily European with a total visible minority estimated at 17%. The neighbourhood was the childhood home of Quebec writers Michel Tremblay and Mordecai Richler and both have set many stories in the Plateau of the 1950s and 60s. The Plateau is currently a creative family oriented upper-middle-class neighbourhood. While the Eastern part remains largely Québécois, the Plateau (now nicknamed "La Nouvelle-France") is also emerging as a French enclave of those fleeing Paris' transitioning cultural climate.

The Plateau is characterized by brightly coloured houses, cafés, book shops, and a laissez-faire attitude that embraces its bohemian nature over the commercialized hipster culture of its Mile-End counterpart. It's the location of some famous attractions on Saint Lawrence Boulevard, including Schwartz's Deli (famous for its Montreal smoked meat), and a weekend street fair during the summer that sees extremely crowded streets. In 1997, Utne Reader rated it one of the 15 "hippest" neighbourhoods in North America.

== Demographics ==
Source: ^{,}

Historical populations
Year	Pop.	±%
1966	176,090	—
1971	158,585	−9.9%
1976	135,490	−14.6%
1981	113,866	−16.0%
1986	106,569	−6.4%
1991	100,375	−5.8%
1996	99,575	−0.8%
2001	101,364	+1.8%
2006	101,054	−0.3%
2011	100,390	−0.7%
2016	104,000	+3.6%
2021	105,813	+1.7%

Home language (2016)
Language	Population	Percentage (%)
French	65,715	67%
English	22,230	23%
Other languages	9,670	10%

Mother Tongue (2016)
Language	Population	Percentage (%)
French	62,995	62%
English	15,775	16%
Other languages	20,545	21%

Visible Minorities (2016)
Ethnicity	Population	Percentage (%)
Not a visible minority	83,795	82.6%
Visible minorities	17,705	17.4%

Le Plateau has the highest concentration of youths in Montreal and overall average age range of 25–34 years old.

In the 21st century, the large number of French-born residents of the neighbourhood has earned it the nicknames of "le Petit-Paris" and "la Petite-France".

== Government ==
=== Borough council ===
Following the November 5, 2017 Montreal municipal election and an October 6, 2019 by-election for borough mayor, the current borough council consists of the following councillors:

District	Position	Name	Party
—	Borough mayor City councillor	Luc Rabouin	Projet Montréal
De Lorimier	City councillor	Marianne Giguère	Projet Montréal
De Lorimier	Borough councillor	Josefina Blanco	Projet Montréal
Jeanne-Mance	City councillor	Alex Norris	Projet Montréal
Jeanne-Mance	Borough councillor	Maeva Vilain	Projet Montréal
Mile-End	City councillor	Richard Ryan	Projet Montréal
Mile-End	Borough councillor	Marie Plourde	Projet Montréal

=== Federal and provincial ===
The borough is divided among the following federal ridings:

- Outremont
- Ville-Marie—Le Sud-Ouest—Île-des-Sœurs
- Laurier—Sainte-Marie

It is divided among the following provincial electoral districts:

- Hochelaga-Maisonneuve
- Mont-Royal–Outremont
- Mercier
- Sainte-Marie–Saint-Jacques
- Westmount–Saint-Louis

== Education ==
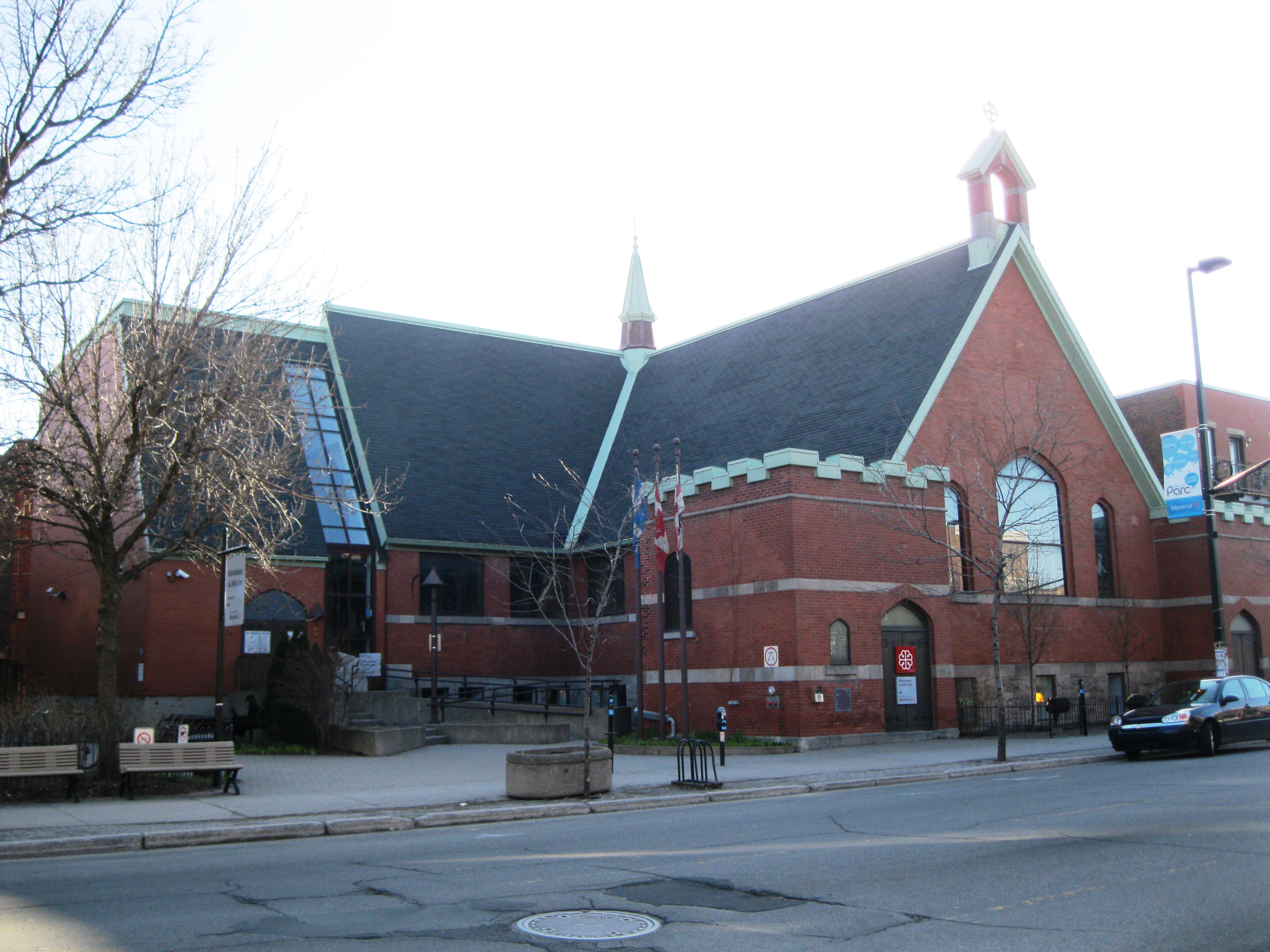
Mordecai Richler Library in Mile End

The Commission scolaire de Montréal (CSDM) operates Francophone public schools and the English Montreal School Board (EMSB) operates Anglophone public schools in the borough. The two school boards jointly operate F.A.C.E. School, a bilingual art-oriented school located in the Milton Park neighbourhood.

McGill University maintains a significant presence in the borough, including four residence halls, Presbyterian College and the Steinberg Centre for Simulation and Interactive Learning.

The borough has two libraries of the Montreal Public Libraries Network: Bibliothèque Mordecai-Richler (located in Mile End) and Bibliothèque du Plateau-Mont-Royal.

== Features ==
Overlooked by the eastern face of Mount Royal, the borough is served by part of the orange line of the Montreal metro, including Sherbrooke, Mont-Royal, and Laurier stations.

Important features of the borough include the hospital Hôtel-Dieu de Montréal, Lafontaine Park, and Jeanne Mance Park.

The borough is largely composed of the well-known Plateau neighbourhood, famous for its bohemian reputation and characteristic architecture. The neighbourhoods of Mile End, Côte Saint-Louis, and Milton-Parc are also located in the borough.

Montreal's Little Portugal neighbourhood is situated in the western portion of the borough.

Le Plateau-Mont-Royal borough council has undertaken various renaturalisation and traffic-calming projects in recent years under the leadership of borough Mayor Luc Ferrandez. The reconstruction of intersections now usually involves constructing road-diets (where vehicular traffic space has been reduced) in favour of wider sidewalks and large naturalised areas with grasses, flowers and other indigenous plant species. The renaturalisation of some alleyways has been realised through the removal of asphalt or concrete along the edge of property lines for soil; local residents can plant whatever they choose. Many streets underwent one-directional reassignments.

== See also ==
- Boroughs of Montreal
- Districts of Montreal
- Municipal reorganization in Quebec
