= Jarry station =

Montreal Metro station

Jarry
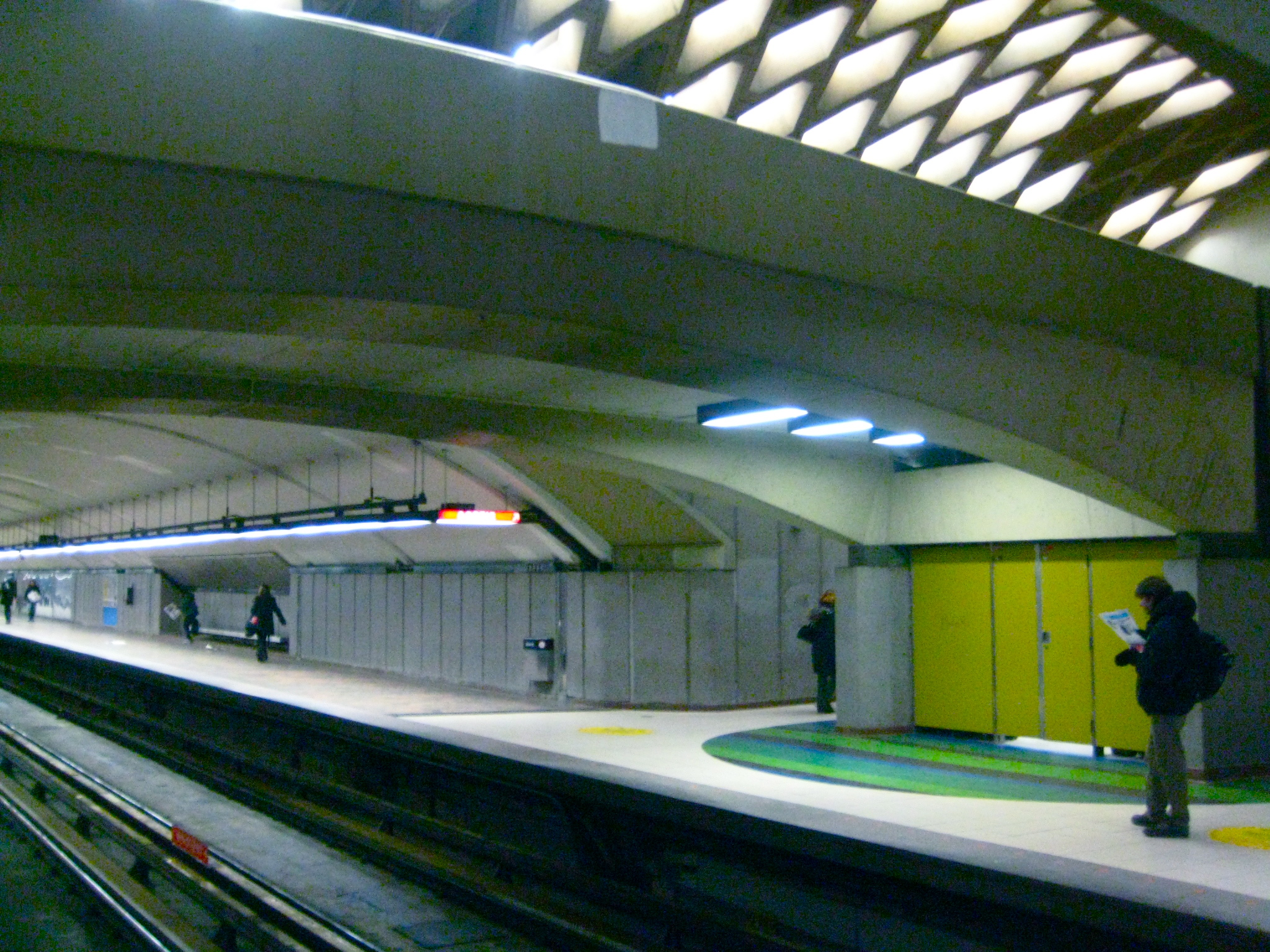

General information
- Location: 504, rue Jarry Est; Montreal, Quebec H2R 2H2; Canada
- Coordinates: 45°32′36″N 73°37′43″W
- Operator: Société de transport de Montréal
- Platforms: 2 side platforms
- Tracks: 2
- Connections: STM bus

Construction
- Depth: 12.2 metres (40 feet), 42nd deepest
- Accessible: No
- Architect: Lemoyne, Bland, Edwards, & Shine

Other information
- Fare zone: ARTM: A

History
- Opened: 14 October 1966

Passengers
- 2024: 2,941,093 ▲7.46%
- Rank: 32 of 68

Services
Preceding station	Montreal Metro	Following station
Jean-Talon toward Côte-Vertu	Orange Line	Crémazie toward Montmorency
Location

Jarry station is a Montreal Metro station in the borough of Villeray–Saint-Michel–Parc-Extension in Montreal, Quebec, Canada. It is operated by the Société de transport de Montréal (STM) and serves the Orange Line. The station opened on October 14, 1966, as part of the original network of the Metro.

== Overview ==
The station, designed by Lemoyne, Bland, Edwards, & Shine, is a normal side platform station, built in tunnel. The mezzanine near the north end is connected to an entrance integrated into the ground floor of an apartment building. The station is known for the diamond-shaped caissons in the ceiling of the transept.

== Origin of the name ==
This station is named for rue Jarry, which in turn commemorates Bernard Bleignier dit Jarry, who received a concession in 1700 that later became the village of Saint-Laurent. The street was built on land that had belonged to Stanislas Bleignier Jarry Sr. a descendant of Bernard Jarry; at the time the street was named in 1907, his son Stanislas Jr. was mayor of the parish municipality of Saint-Laurent, in which the street was located. Nearby Jarry Park, however, is named for Raoul Jarry, a Montreal city councillor, son of Stanislas Sr. and brother of Stanislas Jr., who played a role in developing the park.

== Connecting bus routes ==
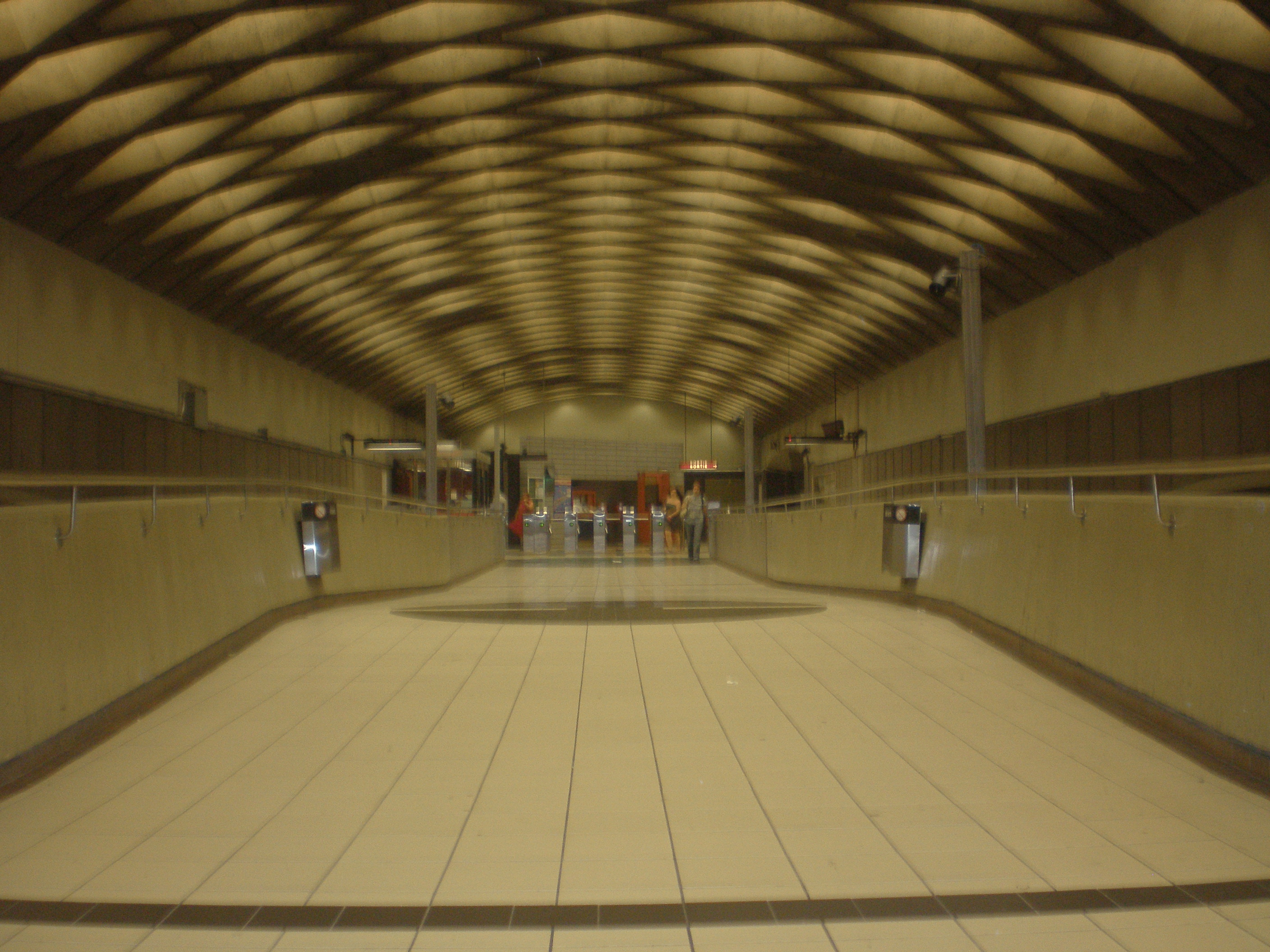
Inside Jarry station

Société de transport de Montréal
No.	Route	Connects to	Service times / notes
31	Saint-Denis	Henri-Bourassa; Sauvé; Crémazie; Jean-Talon; Beaubien; Rosemont; Laurier; Mont-Royal; Sherbrooke	Daily
193	Jarry	Pie-IX BRT	Daily
361 ☾	Saint-Denis	Replaces the Orange Line from Henri-Bourassa to Place-d'Armes	Night service

video of the outside and inside of Jarry station

== Nearby points of interest ==
- Parc Jarry (Jarry Park)
- Centre d'emploi du Canada (Canada Employment Centre)
- Stade IGA (Via 193 West)
