= Georges-Vanier station =

Montreal Metro station

Georges-Vanier

General information
- Location: 2040, rue Saint-Antoine Ouest; Montreal, Quebec H3J 1A6; Canada
- Coordinates: 45°29′20″N 73°34′36″W
- Operator: Société de transport de Montréal
- Platforms: 2 side platforms
- Tracks: 2
- Connections: STM bus

Construction
- Depth: 17.7 metres (58 feet 1 inch), 20th deepest
- Accessible: No
- Architect: Pierre-W. Major

Other information
- Fare zone: ARTM: A

History
- Opened: 28 April 1980

Passengers
- 2024: 960,905 ▲10.33%
- Rank: 68 of 68

Services
Preceding station	Montreal Metro	Following station
Lionel-Groulx toward Côte-Vertu	Orange Line	Lucien-L'Allier toward Montmorency
Location

Georges-Vanier station (French pronunciation: [ʒɔʁʒ vanje]) is a Montreal Metro station in the borough of Le Sud-Ouest in Montreal, Quebec, Canada. It is operated by the Société de transport de Montréal (STM) and serves the Orange Line. It is located in the Little Burgundy area.

== Overview ==
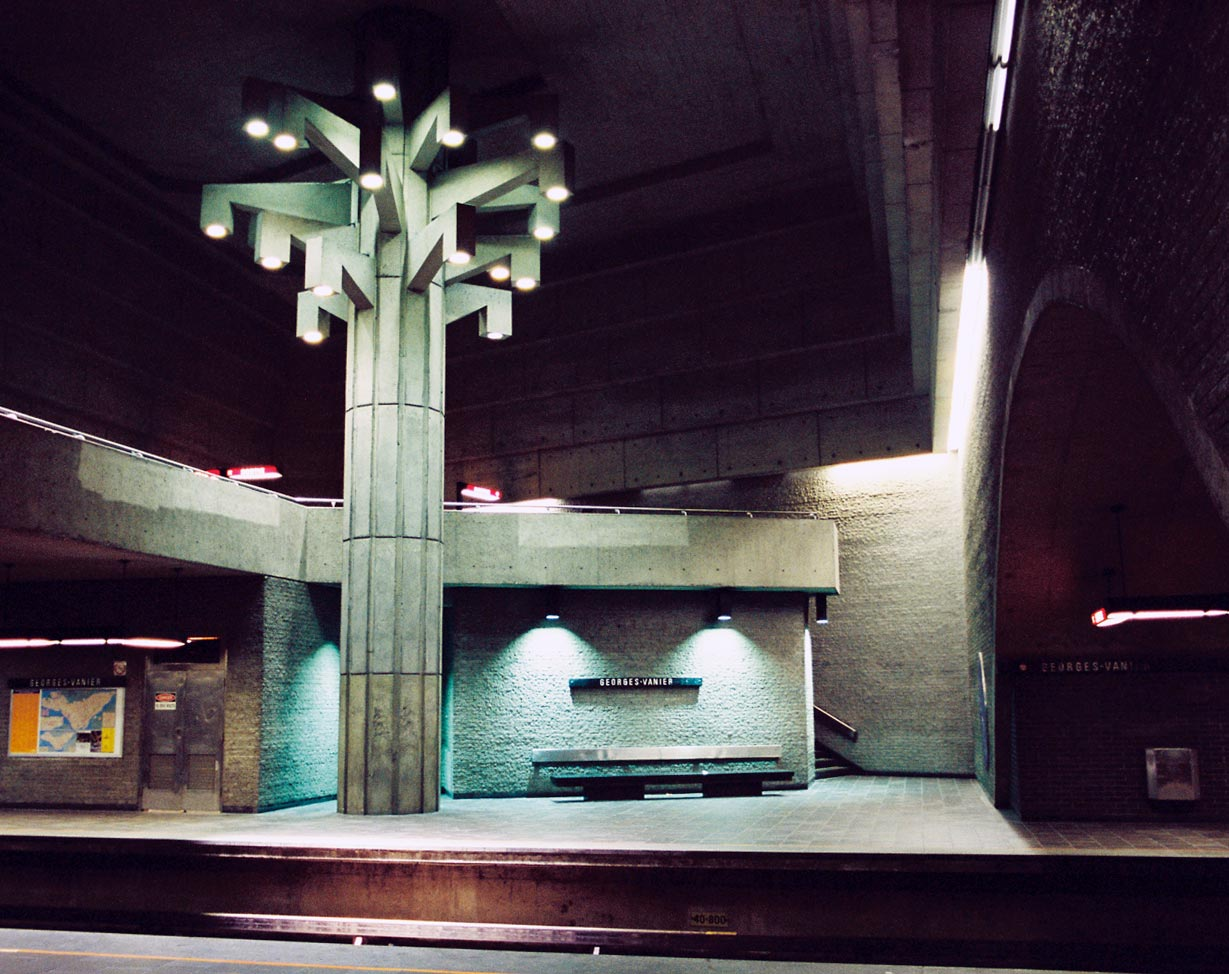
Concrete sculpture entitled Un Arbre dans le Parc (A tree in the park).

The station, designed by architect Pierre-W. Major, is a normal side platform station, and has one access. The huge underground volume of the station mezzanine is lighted by a single, round skylight, and is decorated with a sculpture, Un arbre dans le parc, by Michel Dernuet, is situated on the Côte-Vertu platform; it is a large concrete pillar with illuminated branches, representing a tree. The wall facing the easternmost stairs for the Montmorency platform is faced with blue ceramic symbolizing a fresh spring in the woods.

In most years, the station is the least used in the network since it was long the only one with no connecting bus route. It was 68th of 68 in traffic in 2011 with 773,078 passengers embarking here.

== Origin of the name ==
This station is named for the boul. Georges-Vanier, named for the Rt. Hon. Georges-Philias Vanier. Born a few steps from the street that now bears his name, Major-General Vanier was a distinguished soldier in World War I and Canada's ambassador to all Allied governments in World War II. He served as the 19th Governor General of Canada, the first French-Canadian to occupy that position, from 1959 until his death.

== Connecting bus routes ==
Société de transport de Montréal
No.	Route	Connects to	Service times / notes
57	Charlevoix	Charlevoix; Atwater	Daily

== Nearby points of interest ==
- Centre communautaire Bon-Pasteur
- Black Community Centre
- Canadian Centre for Architecture
- Église St. Anthony of Padua

== 2008 station closure ==
On May 26, 2008 the STM announced the temporary closure of the Georges-Vanier station from June 2, 2008 to September 5, 2008 due to major repairs needed at the station.
