= Lucien L'Allier =

Canadian electrical engineer

Lucien L'Allier (1909–1978) was a Canadian engineer who is best known for having led the construction of the Montreal Metro, the city's subway system.

== Early life ==
Born in the suburb of Saint-Laurent, Quebec he studied with the Frères des écoles chrétiennes, Collège Sainte-Marie de Montréal and McGill University, from which he graduated with a degree in electrical engineering.

== Career ==
In 1935, he took part in a three-year project working on the telephone networks of Bell Canada, and later worked for the Canadian Broadcasting Corporation as regional engineer until 1946. In 1946, he joined the staff of the city of Montreal, and became the city's engineering director in 1954. In 1961 the construction of the Montreal Metro began, during which he oversaw the massive construction project of 5,000 workers. In 1964, he was appointed Chairman of the Montreal Transit Commission, a position he held until his retirement in 1974. McGill University awarded him an honorary doctorate in 1966.

== Legacy ==
After his death in 1978, a Metro station was renamed in his honour. Rue de l'Aqueduc, north of rue Saint-Jacques, became rue Lucien-L'Allier in 1979. In 2001, the commuter rail station adjacent to the Metro station was also renamed.
