= MR-63 =

Retired metro train used in Montreal

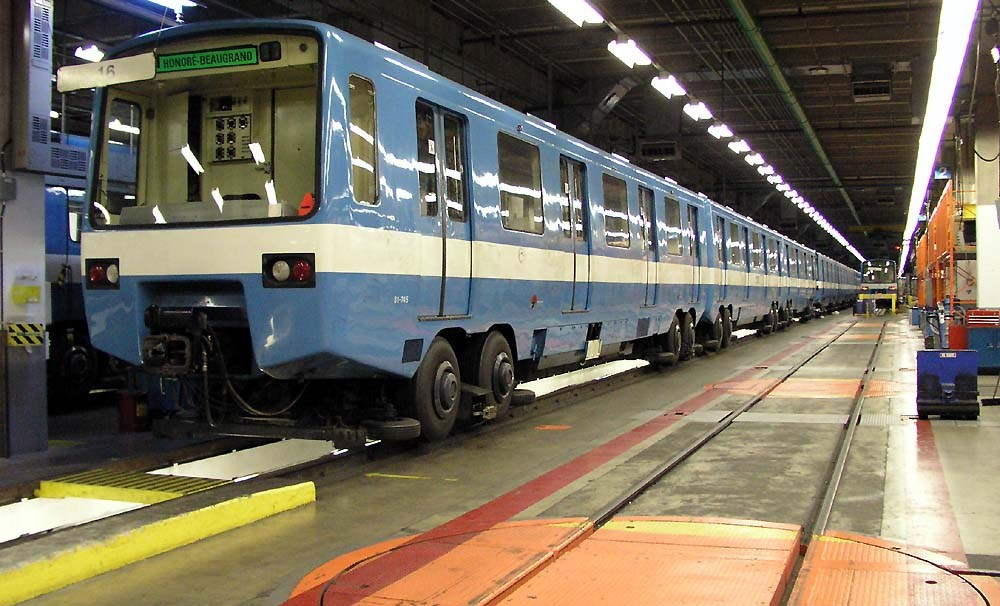
- An MR-63 train on the Green Line

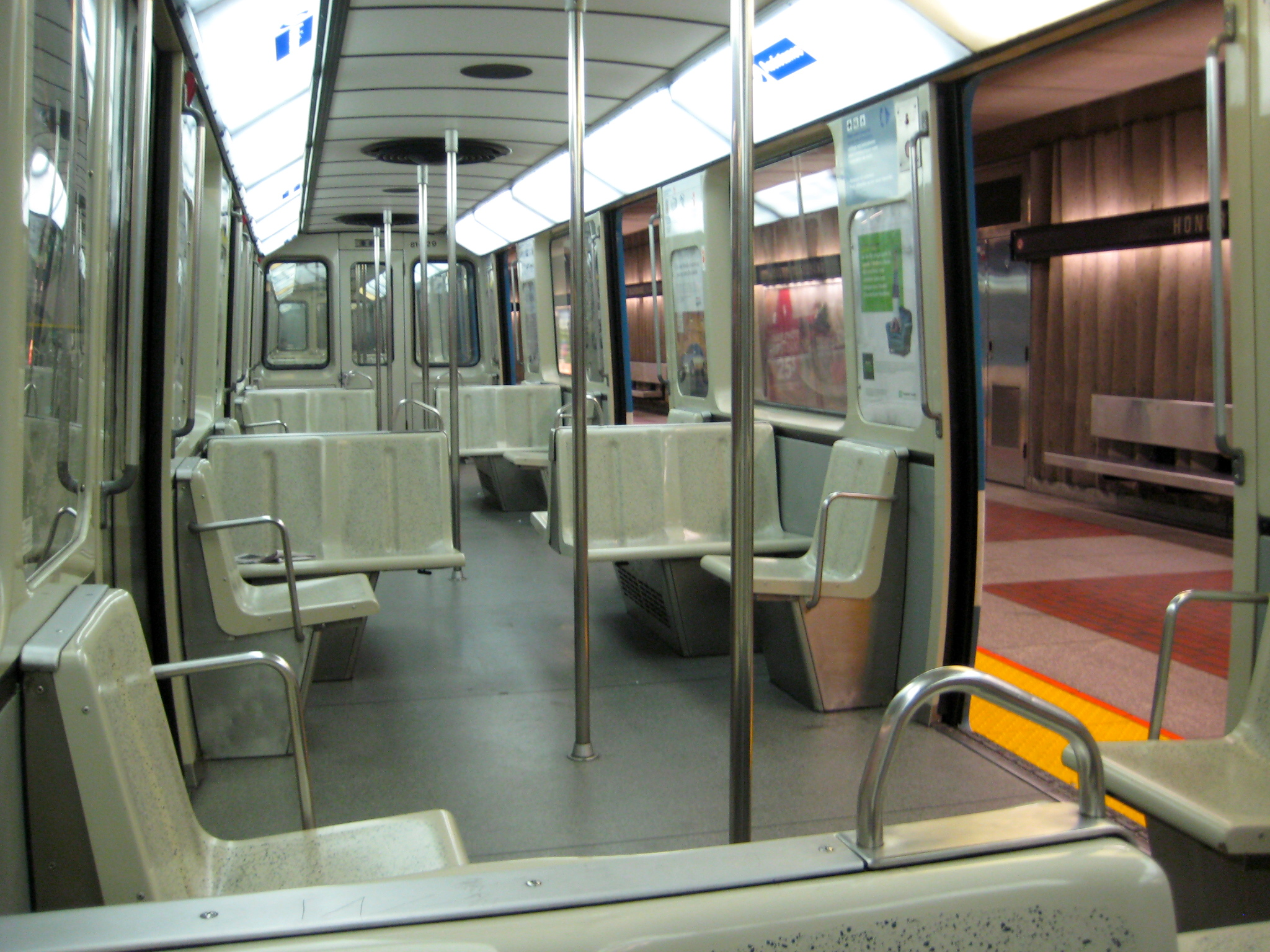
- Refurbished interior of an MR-63 train
- In service: October 14, 1966 – June 21, 2018
- Manufacturers: Canadian Vickers, CIMT-Lorraine
- Built at: Viauville, Mercier–Hochelaga-Maisonneuve, Montreal
- Constructed: 1963 (motor); 1965–1967 (trailer)
- Entered service: 14 October 1966
- Refurbished: AMF Technotransport (1991–1993)
- Scrapped: 2016–2018, and 2021 for element 3 (81-505, 80,003, 81-506)
- Number built: 369 vehicles (123 sets in 3-car formation, 41 sets in complete 9-car formation)
- Number scrapped: 33 vehicles (destroyed in 1971 and 1974 fires); 313 vehicles (replaced like-for-like by MPM-10 between 2016 and September 15, 2018)
- Successor: MPM-10 "Azur"
- Formation: 9 cars per trainset (6 cars on the Yellow Line)
- Fleet numbers: 81-501 to 81–746 (motor); 80-001 to 80–123 (trailer)
- Capacity: 160 passengers per car, 39–40 passengers seated (1,440 passengers in complete 9-car set)
- Operator: Société de transport de Montréal

Specifications
- Car body construction: Lightweight steel alloy
- Width: 2.5 m (8 ft 2 7/16 in)
- Floor height: 46 in (1,200 mm)
- Platform height: 46 in (1,200 mm)
- Doors: 4 pairs per side
- Maximum speed: 80 km/h (49.7 mph) (design); 72 km/h (44.7 mph) (service)
- Weight: 26,080 kg (57,500 lb) per car (unladen)
- Steep gradient: 6.5%
- Traction motors: 360 V series rheostatic traction motors, Hitachi prototype chopper (elements 10, 11 and 12), Canron–Jeumont prototype chopper (elements 40, 41 and 42)
- Power output: 113 kW (152 hp)
- Acceleration: 4.8 km/(h⋅s) (3.0 mph/s)
- HVAC: Forced-air ventilation, in-train heater
- Electric system: 750 V DC (nominal) from "third rail" on guide bars at either track side
- Current collection: Side-running contact shoe
- Bogies: 2 sets per car
- Braking system: Electromagnetic brakes using wooden brake shoes
- Safety system: ATC (ATO)
- Track gauge: 1,435 mm (4 ft 8 1/2 in) between 2 roll ways

Notes/references
- "MR-63 Specifications" (PDF). Société de transport de Montréal.

The MR-63 (Matériel roulant 1963) was the first generation of rubber-tyred rolling stock of the Montreal Metro in the city of Montreal, Quebec, Canada. Based on the MP 59 of the Paris Métro in France, the trains were in use on three of Montreal's four Metro lines from 1966 until 2018. By the time of their withdrawal, the trains were among the oldest still in use on any metro system in North America, at 52 years old.

== History ==
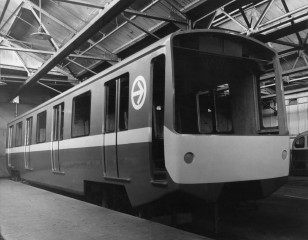
Initial concept design of the trains

As part of the development of the Montreal Metro in the early 1960s, the City of Montreal was assisted in the detailed design and engineering of the Metro by French consultant SOFRETU, owned by the operator of the Paris Métro. It was decided that the new Metro would use a similar rubber-tired train design as used on the Paris Métro – instead of steel ones as used on the Toronto subway.

A large number of rolling stock manufacturers were expected to bid for the rolling stock contract, with French firms expected to have an advantage due to the Paris Métro design. However high tariffs on manufacturers from France (22.5%) and Britain (7%) meant that only two bids were received in June 1963, both from Canadian firms. The cheapest bid was from Montreal Locomotive Works (MLW), who had built the M series trains for the Toronto subway. However, aircraft and shipbuilder Canadian Vickers had the support of the French company CIMT-Lorraine which helped to design the rubber-tired system used in Paris. Both bids were thought to be too expensive, and therefore specifications of the trains were amended to reduce the cost. The number of cars to be ordered increased from 252 to 369 cars due to extensions to be built.

After negotiations with both MLW and Canadian Vickers, the Commission de transport de Montréal (CTM) awarded the MR-63 contract to Canadian Vickers in August 1963, at a cost of $45 million.

=== Production and entry into service ===
The cars were built at the Canadian Vickers shipyards in the Viauville neighbourhood of the Mercier–Hochelaga-Maisonneuve borough of Montreal, designed by Morley L. Smith for Guillon Designers Inc., founded by Jacques Guillon. Around 82 percent of the train was manufactured in Canada, with the French traction and control equipment built under licence in Canada.

The first of the 369 cars was delivered on August 24, 1965. The first trains were introduced into service on October 14, 1966, on the opening of the Montreal Metro. During their time in service, the fleet underwent numerous technological and reliability upgrades. In 1976, automatic train operation was introduced. Between 1991 and 1993, all in-service MR-63 cars underwent major refurbishment by AMF Technotransport at the Canadian National Pointe-Saint-Charles workshops. This refurbishment also included repainting to match the livery of the MR-73 trains. Further upgrades and improvements included solid-state door interlocks in 2003, modern ergonomic driver cabs with new digital dashboards, and automatic station announcements in 2005 (voiced by Michèle Deslauriers).

In the early 1980s, MR-73 cars replaced the older MR-63 cars on the Orange line.

=== Retirement ===
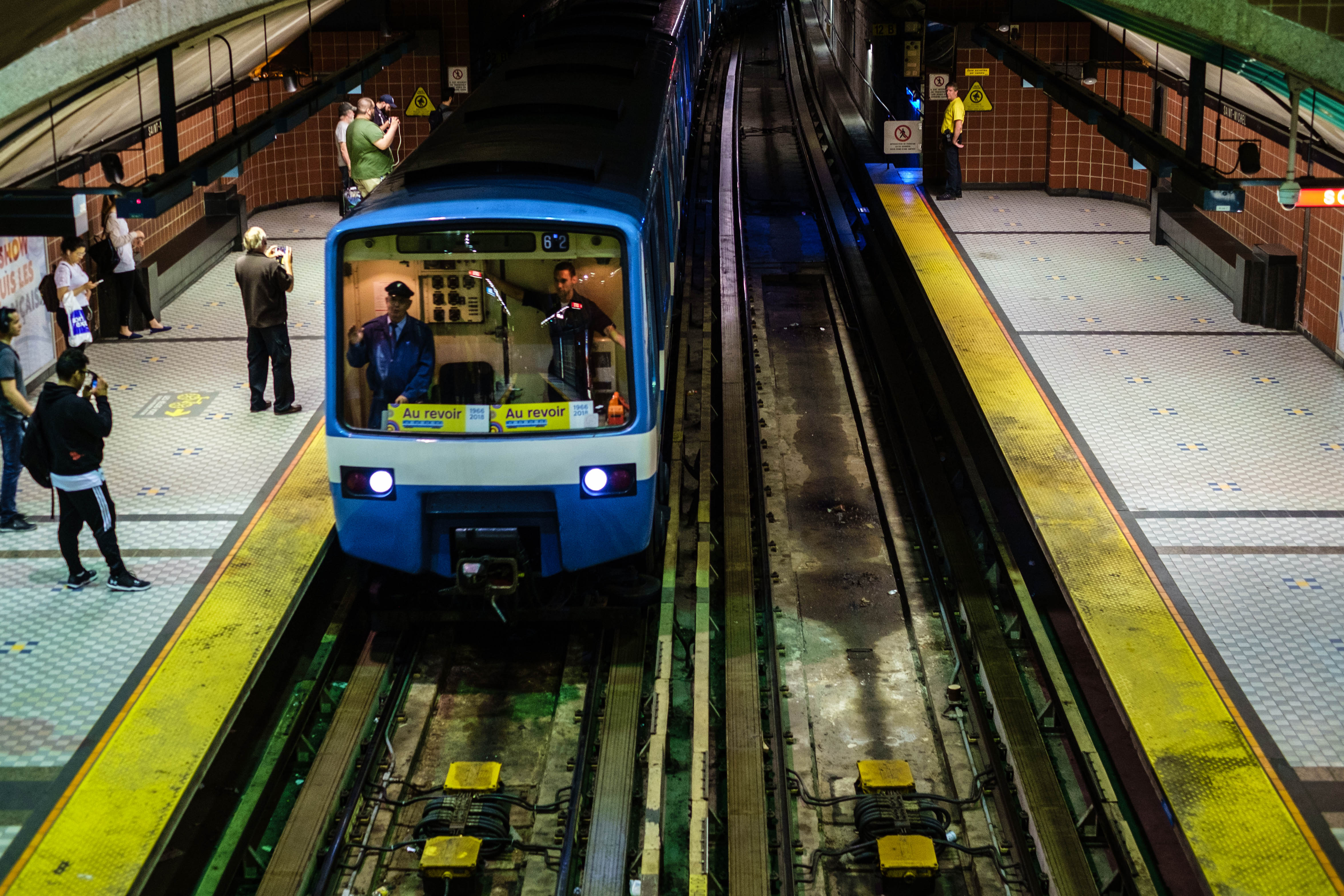
One of the final trips of the MR-63s on June 21, 2018

By 2005, the original MR-63 Montreal Metro trains were around 40 years old, and maintenance costs were rising. Société de transport de Montréal (STM) indicated that these trains would be replaced by modern rolling stock in the coming decade. New MPM-10 Azur trains were ordered from a Bombardier Transportation and Alstom consortium, and these trains entered service in 2016. As Azur trains entered service, MR-63 trains were retired one by one. The last MR-63 trains were retired between the last few months of 2017 and June 2018.

On May 30, 2018, STM announced that after June 21, 2018, with 52 years of loyal service, all of its remaining MR-63 métro cars were being withdrawn from service. The milestone was underlined by a communication campaign and a "farewell tour" on all four Montreal Metro lines. The last original train was decorated with information about the cars and featured copies of posters from 1966 from its early operation. It was operated as part of normal morning and afternoon rush hour service between June 18 and 21, 2018.

In July 2021, MR-63 Element 3 (81-505, 80-003, and 81-506) was scrapped at AIM Recyclage. Prior to this, after its final run on the Blue Line, it was stored behind the Saint-Michel tail tracks with plans to be repurposed for films and special occasions. However, these plans were ultimately abandoned due to space limitations and associated costs.

==== Preservation ====
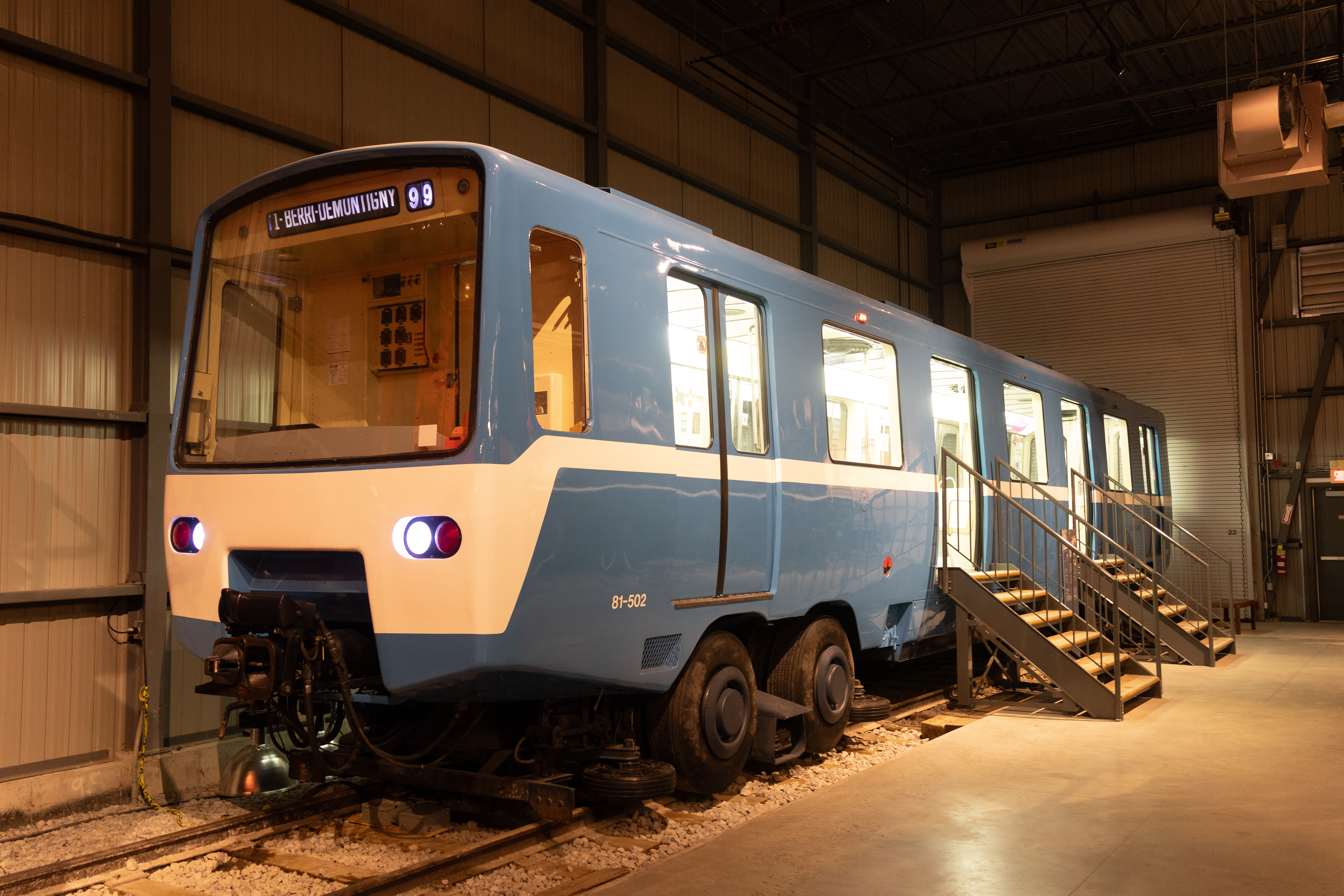
The inaugural MR-63 car preserved at the Canadian Railway Museum

Car 81-502, the first MR-63 car delivered, is preserved and on display at Exporail, the Canadian Railway Museum, in Saint-Constant, Quebec, since October 12, 2018. Car 81-526 is on display at the entrance of Jardins de Métis. Car 81-628 is on display at École polytechnique de Montréal, where it is used as a centre for student health. Car 80-064 has been repurposed for use at the Taz Skatepark.

The following cars are currently stored for future use at the MR-63 pavilion in Griffintown: 81-616, 81-623, 81-624, 81-658, 81-724, 81-746, 80-058, and 80–112. Additionally, an MR-63 car, now identified as 79-784, is in use at the STM fire training facility. This particular car was a victim of the 1971 fire but has since been refurbished.

== Design ==
The cars were made of a lightweight steel alloy, 2.5 meters (8 ft 2 in) wide by 16 meters (52 ft 6 in) long and with four double sliding doors on each side. Each car had 40 seats, with a maximum load of 160 passengers per car. The trains run in three car sets, formed of two motor cars with a trailer in-between them. The 369 cars could be formed as a combination of 3, 6 or 9-car trainsets. The MR-63 was identified with grey interiors, four ventilation hoods protruding over the roof of each car, two 113 kW (152 hp) 360-V series traction motors that make a whining noise, and round cab headlights.

The industrial design of the train was undertaken by Jacques Guillon in 1963. The colour of the train was a contentious decision, with Mayor of Montreal Jean Drapeau preferring the traditional white and red of the City of Montréal, with Guillon arguing for light blue with a white stripe, the traditional colours of Quebec. Eventually, a baby blue colour was chosen, which "matched Lucien L'Allier's wife’s sweater”.

=== Motor design ===
The MR-63 model uses a series-to-parallel servo camshaft rheostat to control and regulate power to its traction motors; this control system can be heard tapping under the floor of a motor car as the train undergoes rapid acceleration at an initial rate of 1.33 m/s^{2} (4.4 ft/s^{2}) (4.8 km/(h⋅s) or 3.0 mph/s). This control system also features a dynamic rheostatic braking mode that uses the motors to slow the train, turning the motors into generators and dissipating the resulting energy as heat in the rheostat grid.

=== Hitachi and Jeumont prototype trains ===
In the early 1970s, two separate three-car trainsets had their original traction systems replaced with two chopper prototype traction systems, one manufactured by Hitachi (fitted onto elements 10, 11 and 12), and another manufactured by the Canron company based on a Jeumont original design (fitted onto elements 40, 41 and 42). The Hitachi chopper system fitted onto elements 10, 11 and 12 were subsequently changed back into their original traction systems a few years later. Jeumont elements 41 and 42 were however stored out of service until 2005 when they returned as trailer cars attached to other motor cars, where they remained in service until 2017, when they were retired alongside other MR-63s being replaced by MPM-10 trains. Jeumont element 40 was retired from service earlier than elements 41 and 42 because it needed to be cannibalised for spare parts for elements 41 and 42 that were no longer being manufactured. Jeumont element 40 has since then been used as part of the Just for Laughs festival.

== Reliability ==
Maintenance of Montreal's subway cars is rigorous, as reliability levels (Mean Distance Between Failures/MDBF ratings) are more than double that of typical North American subway cars by North American standards (at 200,000 km or 124,300 mi in 2004). Furthermore, the entire metro is underground, with trains stored under cover at all times.

In later years, obsolete components and parts availability meant the trains gradually became less reliable, and ride quality deteriorated as suspension systems and rubber spring packs hardened with age. Poor ride quality was not attributed to the tires or tracks. By the time of their withdrawal in 2018, Montreal's rolling stock were among the oldest still in use on any metro system in North America, at 52 years old.

== Lines serviced ==
Green Line (1966–2018)

Orange Line (1966–2008, June 20, 2018)

Yellow Line (1967–2018)

Blue Line (only on June 21, 2018)

Formation (as of June 21, 2018)

Line #	Colour	Number of trains	Composition	Comments
1		13 (117 cars)	(81-xxx + 80-xxx + 81-xxx + 81-xxx + 80-xxx + 81-xxx + 81-xxx + 80-xxx + 81-xxx)	Replaced by MR-73 and MPM-10 Azur cars.
2		4 (36 cars)	(81-xxx + 80-xxx + 81-xxx + 81-xxx + 80-xxx + 81-xxx + 81-xxx + 80-xxx + 81-xxx)	Destroyed in 1971 to 1974 from train collisions at Henri-Bourassa station
4		5 (30 cars)	(81-xxx + 80-xxx + 81-xxx + 81-xxx + 80-xxx + 81-xxx + 81-xxx + 80-xxx + 81-xxx)	Replaced by MR-73 cars in 2017.
5		1 (6 cars)	(81-501 + 80-001 + 81-502 + 81-505 + 80-003 + 81-506)	Only on June 21, 2018

== Accidents and incidents ==
- In July 1967, a train operator fainted at the controls of an MR-63 train, causing it to collide with the end wall of the Yellow Line terminus. The incident was attributed to excessive heat buildup in the cab, caused by the train's heaters combined with inadequate airflow from the forced-air ventilation system mounted on the roof. In response, air conditioning was installed in all MR-63 operator cabs, and the passenger cabin ventilation systems were modified to improve airflow.
- On December 8, 1971, a speeding MR-63 train crashed into a parked MR-63 train near Henri-Bourassa station on the Orange Line, causing a 17-hour inferno that destroyed 24 MR-63 coaches parked at the Henri-Bourassa tail tracks. 40-year-old train operator Gerard Maccarone was the sole fatality in this accident, which was later revealed to be caused by a jammed throttle that prevented the train from braking in time. This was at that time the deadliest subway accident ever to have occurred in Canada until the Russell Hill subway accident on the Toronto subway in 1995.
- On January 9, 1974, a series of tire blowouts on a 9-car MR-63 train led to a fire which occurred between Laurier and Rosemont stations on the Orange Line. No deaths resulted from the fire, although the train was completely destroyed.

== See also ==
- List of driverless trains
