= MR-73 =

Metro train model used in Montreal

- An MR-73 train approaching Atwater

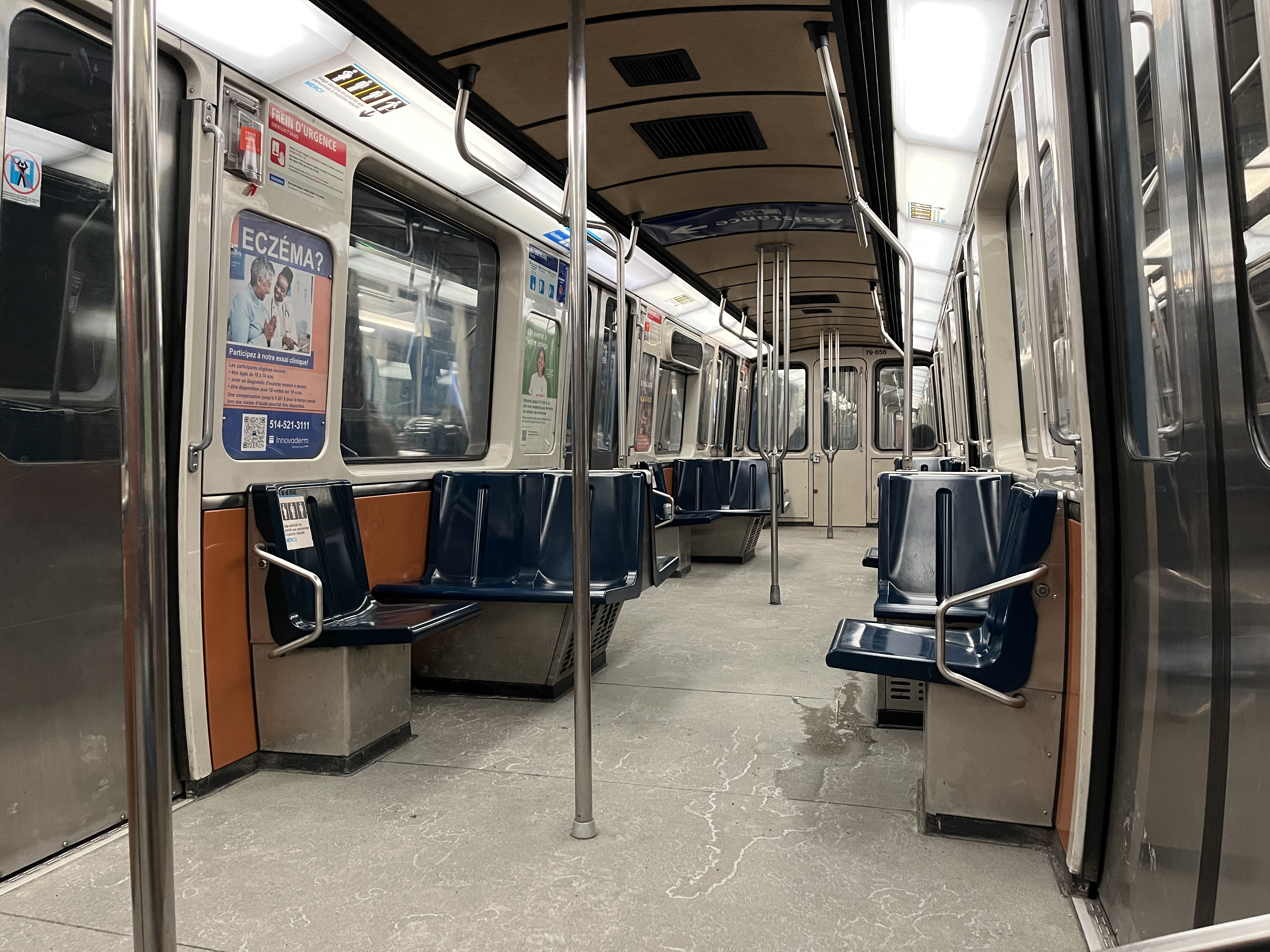
- Refurbished interior of an MR-73 train
- In service: 1976–present
- Manufacturer: Bombardier Transportation
- Built at: La Pocatière, Quebec
- Replaced: MR-63 (rescue)
- Constructed: 1974–1980
- Entered service: 11 November 1976; 50 years ago
- Refurbished: 2005–2008
- Number built: 423 (Note: 105 sets in 3-car formation and 35 sets in complete 9-car formation, except in the Blue Line, which has 36 sets in 2-car formation and 18 sets in complete 6-car formation)
- Number in service: 360
- Number preserved: 1
- Number scrapped: 62
- Formation: 3 cars per trainset, operating as 6- or 9-car trains
- Fleet numbers: 79-501 to 79-782 (motor); & 78-001 to 78-141 (trailer)
- Capacity: 160 total per car; 39–40 seated per car; 1,440 total per train (Note: 700 total per train (Blue Line))
- Operator: Société de transport de Montréal
- Depots: Plateau d'Youville, Saint-Charles, Montmorency, Angrignon, Beaugrand, Côte-Vertu
- Lines served: Green Line; Yellow Line; Blue Line

Specifications
- Car body construction: Lightweight steel alloy
- Width: 2.5 m (8 ft 2 3/8 in)
- Doors: 4 pairs per side
- Maximum speed: 80 km/h (50 mph) (design); 72 km/h (45 mph) (service)
- Weight: 26,990 kg (59,500 lb) per car (unladen)
- Traction system: Chopper control (Jeumont)
- Power output: 174 kW (233 hp)
- Acceleration: 5.2 km/(h⋅s) (3.2 mph/s)
- HVAC: Forced-air ventilation, in-train heater
- Electric system: 750 V DC (nominal) from third rail on guide bars at either track side
- Current collection: Side-running contact shoe
- Bogies: 2 sets per car
- Braking system: Dynamic brakes with STM wooden brake shoes
- Safety system: ATC/ATO
- Multiple working: Yes (2 or 3 trainsets coupled during service)
- Track gauge: 1,435 mm (4 ft 8 1/2 in) between 2 roll ways

The MR-73 (Matériel roulant conçu en 1973) is the second generation of rubber-tired rolling stock used on the Montreal Metro. Manufactured by Bombardier Transportation, they entered service in November 1976.

Since the retirement of the first generation MR-63s, the MR-73 trains are in use on three of Montreal's four Metro lines. Replacement of the trains is planned for 2036, when they will be 60 years old.

== History ==
In the early 1970s, the Commission de transport de la Communauté urbaine de Montréal (CTCUM), the predecessor of the STM, identified a need for more rolling stock to serve the crowds expected for the 1976 Summer Olympics and for future network expansions.

=== Contract award ===
Mayor of Montreal Jean Drapeau suggested to snowmobile manufacturer Bombardier that they should bid on the contract. Although the design of what was to later become the MR-73 was completed in 1973, it was only in 1974 that the CTCUM formally awarded the MR-73 contract to the fledgling Bombardier Transportation. A cheaper bid by Canadian Vickers, manufacturer of the MR-63 trains, was disqualified by a technicality.

=== Construction and entry into service ===
Bombardier had never manufactured a Metro train in Canada, and assistance was sought from SOFRETU, the French consultants who helped design the Metro, as well as from an Austrian subsidiary of Bombardier that previously manufactured trams.

The 423 MR-73 cars were manufactured at Bombardier's La Pocatière plant between 1974 and 1980 and the first units entered service in 1976. The MR-73's original interior featured orange-and-white seats arranged so that in each third of the train, there were two double sets of transverse seating and four single seats near the doors in longitudinal formation.

=== Automated announcements and visual information ===
A visualisation of an Alstom Télécité Modular Display Unit displaying the next station cue for Lionel-Groulx

In the early 1990s, Alstom Télécité LED visual information screens were added on top of alternating side windows in all MR-73 cars.

Advertisements were displayed, along with information on the weather and upcoming stations. Around the same time, automated next-station announcements were introduced on the MR-73 and voiced by Judith Ouimet, which she would be then replaced by Michèle Deslauriers in 2014.

The custom content was phased out as the newer MPM-10 trains were put in service. Télécité displays are still in use on the MR-73 trains, however they are currently kept at their minimum: showing the date and time, announcing stations and their connections as well as any service announcements.

=== Interior refurbishment ===
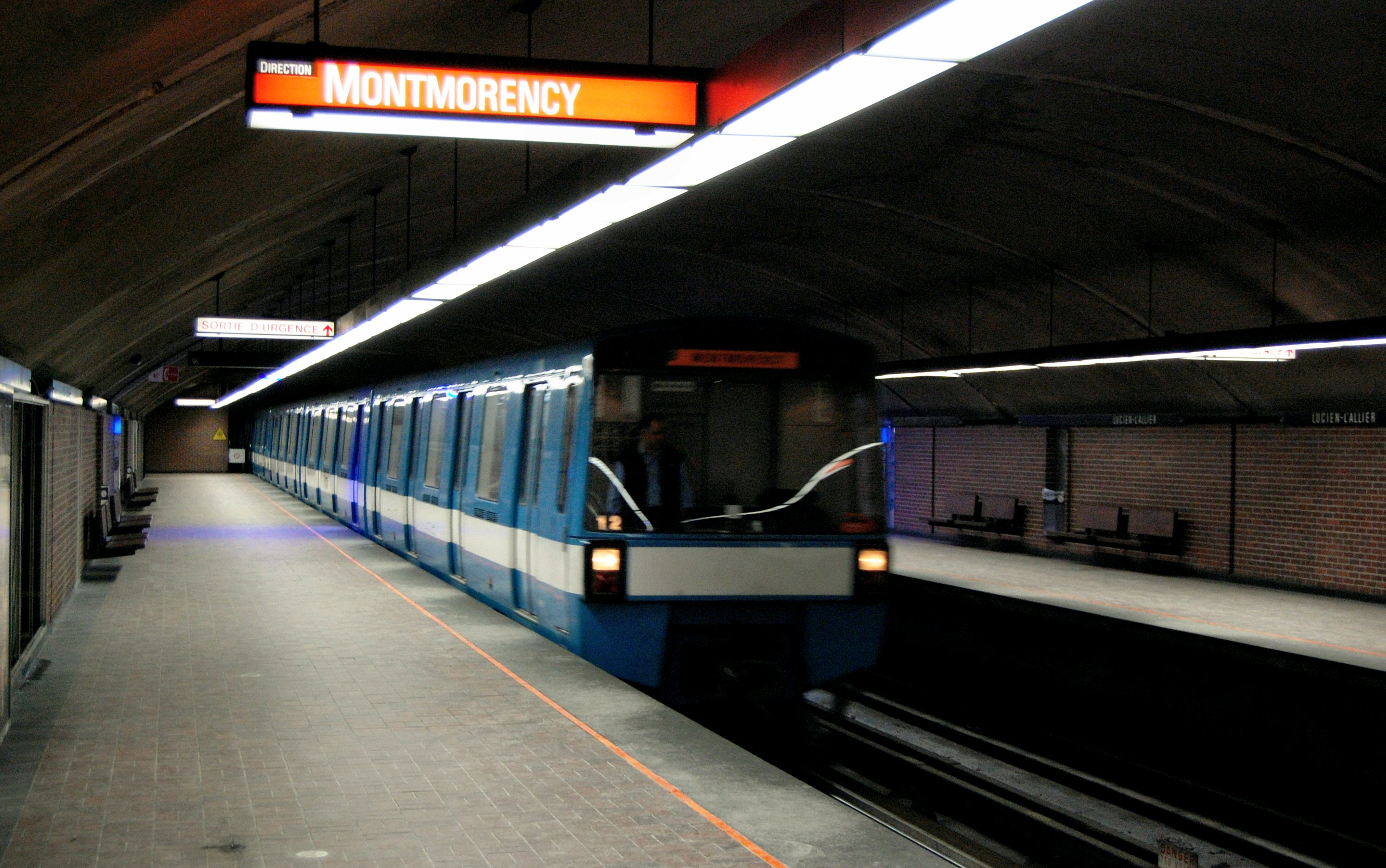
MR-73 approaching Lucien-L’Allier station after refurbishment in 2009

In December 2005, work began to refurbish the now 30 year old trains. The trains were still very reliable, with a Mean Distance Between Failures (MDBF) exceeding 322,000 km (200,000 mi) in 2004.

The MR-73 fleet underwent a $40 million refurbishment to reconfigure interior seating to increase total car capacity and install new poles and new panels with a new ergonomic colour scheme that discouraged vandalism, decreased motion sickness, and promoted aesthetic harmony. Seating capacity was reduced by six per carriage, increasing standing room. The refurbishment also include an ergonomic full-spectrum lighting system that provides therapeutic anti-depression effects for its passengers. Like the older MR-63 fleet, the MR-73 driver cabs was modernized and equipped with ergonomic features and digital dashboards. Work was completed in 2008.

=== Closing doors chime ===
In 2006, an MR-73 train was tested with a four-beep door chime, and in 2008, another high-pitched chime was tested. However, the new chimes were unpopular and so in 2010, a three-note sequence that is essentially replicating the last three audible notes from the electric chopper control traction system was tested, along with a voiceover by Michèle Deslauriers saying Attention, nous fermons les portes (Attention, we are closing the doors) after the three-note sound was played. The voiceover portion was soon removed, however, and since 2012, the MR-73s play the three-note sequence whenever the doors are about to close.

=== Retirement and replacement ===
The STM noted in 2014 that they planned for the fleet to remain in service until at least 2036.

The less reliable cars have been retired, with 63 cars scrapped from June 2021 to make room for the MPM-10 Azur. In June 2021, the first car of the series, 79-501, was returned to the La Pocatière plant, now owned by Bombardier's successor Alstom.

In 2022, STM announced they planned to replace the trains in the 2030s, with work underway to purchase new trains. This was estimated to cost around $2.9bn. The STM also noted that to increase the capacity of the Green Line by 37%, works to upgrade garages and signalling systems would be required as well as new rolling stock.

== Description ==
Departure of an MR-73 from Berri-UQAM. At 0:04 the door closing chime can be heard. At 0:14 the five tones of the chopper (the first two barely audible) can be heard, as well as at 0:44, when the metro accelerates again.

The MR-73 cars can be identified by rectangular cab vertically stacked headlights housing with circular LED headlights, side vents, beige and dark orange interiors, dark-blue seats, and 174 kW (233 hp) traction motors that growl while accelerating, producing a unique three-note sound signature when the train pulls out of a station. The three-note sound is produced by chopper traction motor control equipment, which controls and powers the motors on the train in stages without incurring a power surge. It does so by modulating the current in five consecutive stages (90, 120, 180, 240 and 360 Hz), of which the first two are barely audible over the other noise (fans, wheels) of the metro, but the last three clearly audible. These choppers give the MR-73 an initial rate of acceleration of 1.43 m/s^{2} (4.7 ft/s^{2}) (5.2 km/(h⋅s) or 3.2 mph/s).

The notes of the propulsion are the same as the first three notes of Aaron Copland's "Fanfare for the Common Man", one of the musical themes for Expo 67, but that is apparently just a coincidence. The notes were so remarkable, that in 2010 these notes were chosen as the door closing sound for the Montréal Metro and as brand sound for the entire STM.

A prototype for the current chopper was built by the Canron company using a Jeumont original design in the early 1970s on an MR-63 train. Until the retirement of the MR–63s in 2018, one of the three elements of the "Jeumont Train" were operated on the Green Line among rheostatic-started MR-63s; one of these was much louder than the other. They are the only two to exhibit the whole five-note audible signature in normal operation even though it is possible to hear them during longer-than-usual starts on regular MR-73s.

Some MR-73s originally sported murals of Montreal at the end of the cars; however, they were damaged by vandalism and removed long ago.

The MR-73 has a different electrical braking system from the MR-63 to assist friction braking. The MR-73's current chopper recuperates energy when in braking mode, turning traction motors into generators and sending a regulated current back into the traction power supply for other trains to use. Electrical braking is most effective when one train draws power while it is starting, and another train at a different location sends power while it is braking.

The Mean Distance Between Failures (MDBF) for the MR-73 exceeded 200,000 mi (322,000 km) in 2004.

== Lines serviced ==
Green Line (1976–1985, 2016–present)

Orange Line (1976–2018)

Yellow Line (1976–2008, 2017–present)

Blue Line (1986–present)

Formation (since December 2021)

| Line # | Colour | Number of trains | Composition | Comments |
|---|---|---|---|---|
| 1 | | 13 (117 cars) | {79-xxx} + 78-xxx + {79-xxx} + {79-xxx} + 78-xxx + {79-xxx} + {79-xxx} + 78-xxx + {79-xxx} | The MR-73 and MPM-10 Azur trains replaced the aging MR-63s. |
| 4 | | 5 (45 cars) | {79-xxx} + 78-xxx + {79-xxx} + {79-xxx} + 78-xxx + {79-xxx} + {79-xxx} + 78-xxx + {79-xxx} | |
| 5 | | 18 (108 cars) | {79-xxx} + 78-xxx + {79-xxx} + {79-xxx} + 78-xxx + {79-xxx} | 3-car between 1986 and 2002 and off-peak until 2006 |
