= MPM-10 =

Metro train model used in Montreal

MPM-10 (Azur)
- A MPM-10 train at Peel

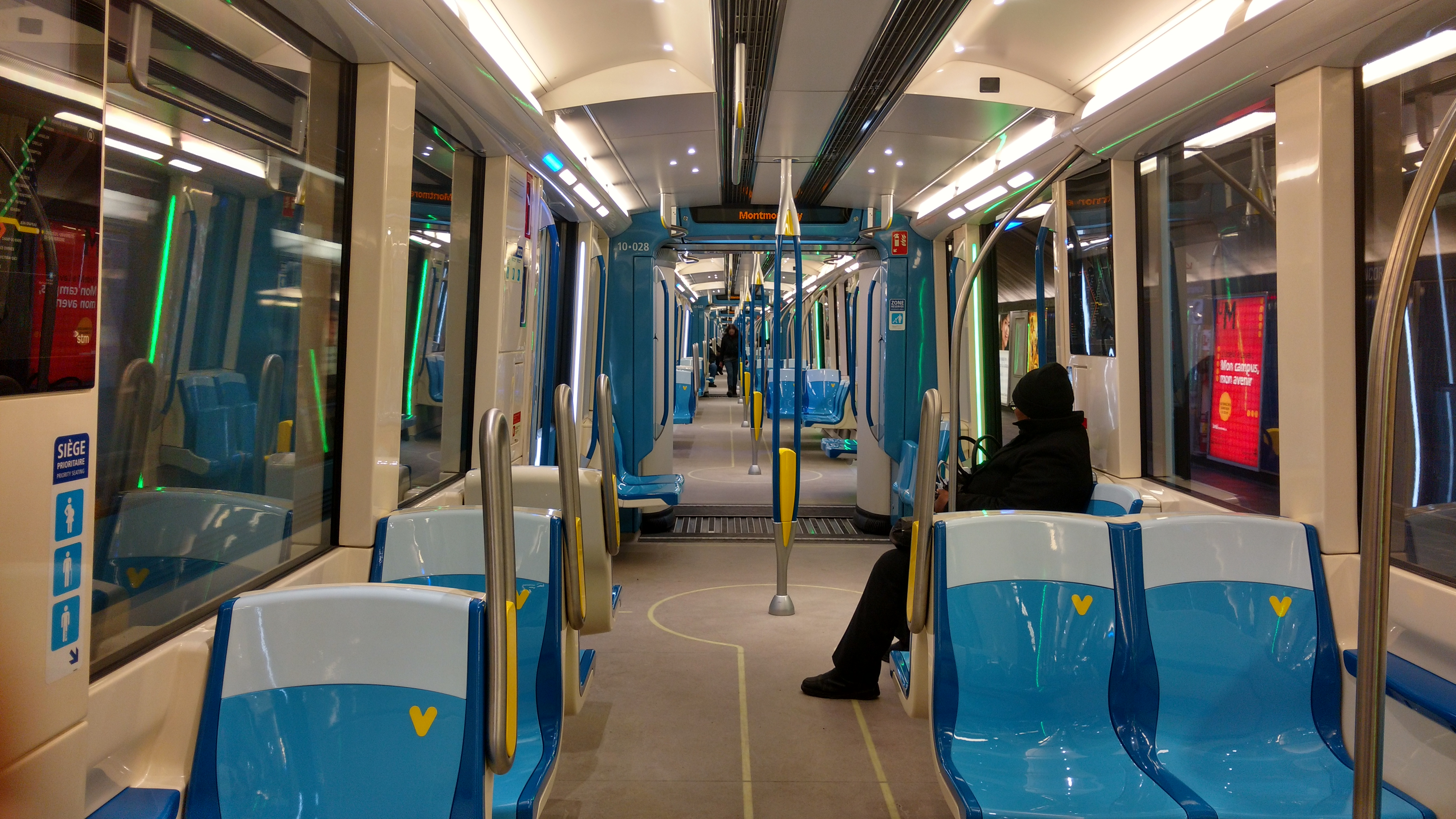
- Interior view of Azur train
- Stock type: Rubber-tyred metro (EMU)
- In service: 2016–present
- Manufacturers: Bombardier Transportation, Alstom
- Designer: Labbé Designers et associés
- Built at: La Pocatière (Bombardier) and Sorel-Tracy (Alstom)
- Replaced: All MR-63s, Some MR-73s
- Constructed: 2011–2021
- Entered service: February 7, 2016
- Number built: 639 cars (71 sets)
- Number in service: 639 cars (71 sets) (as of December 2021)
- Formation: 9-car sets
- Fleet numbers: (10-011 to 10-019) – (10-711 to 10-719)
- Capacity: 262 seats; 1,555 maximum capacity
- Operator: Société de transport de Montréal
- Depots: Plateau d'Youville, Saint-Charles, Montmorency, Angrignon, Beaugrand, Côte-Vertu
- Lines served: Green Line; Orange Line

Specifications
- Car body construction: Stainless steel and aluminium
- Train length: 152,437 mm (500 ft 1 7/16 in)
- Car length: 16,809 mm (55 ft 1 3/4 in); 17,387 mm (57 ft 1/2 in) (end cars)
- Width: 2,514 mm (8 ft 3 in)
- Height: 3,714 mm (12 ft 2 1/4 in)
- Doors: 3 pairs per car
- Wheel diameter: 1,005 mm (39.6 in)
- Wheelbase: 2 m (6 ft 7 in)
- Maximum speed: 100 km/h (62 mph) (design); 72.4 km/h (45.0 mph) (service)
- Weight: 238,209 kg (525,161 lb) (9-car train; empty); 25,345 kg (55,876 lb) (end cars; empty); 26,788 kg (59,057 lb) (intermediate cars; empty)
- Steep gradient: 6.5%
- Traction system: Alstom OPTONIX IGBT–VVVF
- Traction motors: 14 × Alstom 4ELA 2848C 300 kW (400 hp) asynchronous 3-phase AC
- Power output: 4,200 kW (5,600 hp)
- Acceleration: 1.207 m/s^{2} (3.96 ft/s^{2})
- Deceleration: 1.23 m/s^{2} (4.0 ft/s^{2}) (service); 1.79 m/s^{2} (5.9 ft/s^{2}) (emergency)
- HVAC: Faiveley forced-air ventilation, in-train heater
- Electric systems: 750 V DC (nominal) from "third rail" on guide bars at either track side
- Current collection: PCS side-running contact shoe
- UIC classification: 2′2′+B′B′+B′B′+B′B′+B′B′+B′B′+B′B′+B′B′+2′2′
- AAR wheel arrangement: 2-2+B-B+B-B+B-B+B-B+B-B+B-B+B-B+2-2
- Wheels driven: 56 out of 72
- Bogies: Alstom CL 449
- Minimum turning radius: 52 m (170 ft 7 in)
- Braking system: Regenerative braking with STM wooden brake shoes
- Safety system: ATC/ATO
- Multiple working: Bombardier TCMS
- Track gauge: 1,435 mm (4 ft 8 1/2 in) between 2 roll ways

The MPM-10 (Montréal Pneumatic Material 2010), commonly known as the Azur, is the third and newest generation of rubber-tired rolling stock used on the Montreal Metro in Canada, built by a consortium of Bombardier Transportation and Alstom. The first MPM-10 train entered into service on the Orange Line in February 2016, replacing the entire first-generation MR-63 fleet. 71 nine-car trains have been built, and are currently in service on the Orange and Green Lines.

== History ==
By the mid-2000s, the original MR-63 Montreal Metro trains were around 40 years old, and maintenance costs were increasing. Société de transport de Montréal (STM) indicated that these trains would be replaced by modern rolling stock in the coming decade.

In May 2006, the Government of Quebec announced the negotiation of a $1.2 billion contract with Bombardier Transportation to replace the MR-63 fleet of 336 cars, then designated as MR-08. Trains were planned to enter service in the early 2010s. Alstom voiced its dismay over directly awarding the contract (to Bombardier) without a bidding process, noting that (like Bombardier) they would build new trains in Quebec. Negotiations between the STM and Bombardier were ongoing until 2007. The negotiations focused on the project's cost controls, terms of contract, train specifications and warranty. If negotiations had failed, the Quebec government and the STM would have reverted to a bidding process.

On 10 January 2008, Quebec Superior Court Judge Joel Silcoff rendered his decision regarding Alstom's filing of legal action against the Quebec government's Ministry of Transportation. The latter sought to bypass the bidding process, citing that Bombardier was the only domestic candidate capable of fulfilling the eventual contract. Silcoff ruled in favour of Alstom, enabling the company to bid on the contract.

As a consequence, the Government of Quebec decided to open the bidding process in February 2008, however this would delay delivery of the first trains by 9 to 12 months. In November 2008, Bombardier Transportation and Alstom announced that they would be submitting a joint bid to build the trains as a consortium.

In December 2009, CSR Zhuzhou Electric Locomotive expressed interest in bidding for the MR-08 contract citing a cheaper price than its competitors, and proposed an entirely steel-wheeled fleet of vehicles as opposed to the specified rubber-tired vehicles, citing advances in technology that gave steel wheels an advantage. CSR also proposed the construction of a factory in Quebec, creating up to 1,000 jobs and meeting the 60% Canadian content requirement. Spanish company CAF also expressed interest in the project, citing their experience in building rubber-tyred trains – as well as concern about protectionism. However, the STM subsequently rejected both proposals.

=== Contract award ===
In October 2010, the Quebec government awarded the contract to the Bombardier–Alstom consortium, valued at CA$1.2 billion. Bombardier expected the first of the 468 cars to begin entering revenue service by February 2014, with deliveries continuing through 2018. Quebec would contribute 75% of the cost of the new trains, with Montréal providing the remainder.

In May 2012, STM announced that the name of the train would be Azur, following a public vote of shortlisted names. They stated that the name was "evocative of the intense shade of clear blue" throughout the system. In June 2012, the final design of the train was shown. In May 2013, the STM finished preparing the tunnels for the reception of the first test train. This work included grinding concrete on some 200 metres (656 ft) of tunnel, where laser measurements indicated that scraping might occur due to the new trains' softer suspension.

=== Construction ===
The train has a Canadian content of 60%, with production of the bogies taking place at Alstom's Sorel-Tracy plant based on a design used on the MP 89 and MP 05 trains of the Paris Métro (but modified to accommodate wooden brake shoes used by the STM) and final car assembly at Bombardier's La Pocatière plant. The first prototype train was unveiled in November 2013, and was delivered to Montreal in April 2014.

Tests of the prototype revealed several incompatibilities with Montréal's infrastructure, including insufficient electrical power. In January 2015, Bombardier suspended production for six months because of delays with the completion of the automated train control software. In January 2015, production of new Azurs was temporarily halted due to software installation and financing issues. In April 2015, only 4 fully functional MPM-10 trains had been delivered to the STM, while 28 more cars had been assembled before production was halted. Bombardier blamed one of the subcontractors responsible for the automatic driving controls on the new trains for the delay. At the end of 2015, the issues were resolved and the trains remained “on track” to be completed by the 2018 deadline date.

=== Introduction into service ===
After six months of vigorous testing, the first of the new cars entered revenue service at 10 am on February 7, 2016, departing from Henri-Bourassa station towards Côte-Vertu. The new trains were initially well received by the public.

On January 14, 2017, the STM removed all trainsets from circulation after finding unusual damage to the negative collector shoe due to unusual lateral forces being applied to the shoe and shoe mount. The trains were being brought back into service, starting January 28, 2017. On August 14, 2017, the first Azur deployed on the Green Line, for testing. This test phase aimed to "analyze the behavior of the train on this line, with the load that the customers on board the train". In October 2017, two Azur trains ran in service on the Green Line.

In February 2018, the Montreal Gazette confirmed that the Bombardier–Alstom consortium would deliver two free trainsets, as the first six trains were delivered late. By May 2018, 43 sets of Azur had been delivered. This effectively replaced the entire MR-63 fleet, which were retired in June 2018.

==== Additional order ====
In May 2018, the STM announced that the Quebec government had allocated funds for an increase of the MPM-10 base order, to include an additional 17 nine-car trains (153 cars). This additional order would replace a portion of the MR-73 fleet, starting with the older and less reliable cars of that series. This would allow 90% of Green Line service to be provided by Azur trains. The contract option was agreed in November 2018, at a cost of $448 million. In December 2021, the final Azur train entered service, making a total of 71 nine-car sets delivered.

=== In service ===
In September 2019, STM announced that straps for standing passengers would be installed in Azur trains, following feedback from passengers that the grab bars were too high. In 2020, STM announced that they would start displaying the occupancy and crowding levels of Azur cars on Metrovision platform screens. This would allow passengers to find quieter/less crowded parts of the train, allowing social distancing during the COVID-19 pandemic.

In August 2026, STM announced that as soon as the Blue Line extension opens in 2031, the Azur trainsets running on the Green Line will be moved to the Blue Line, due to the new signals being incompatible with the MR-73. This will therefore result in the Green Line running only the older MR-73 trainsets, until their retirement.

== Specifications ==
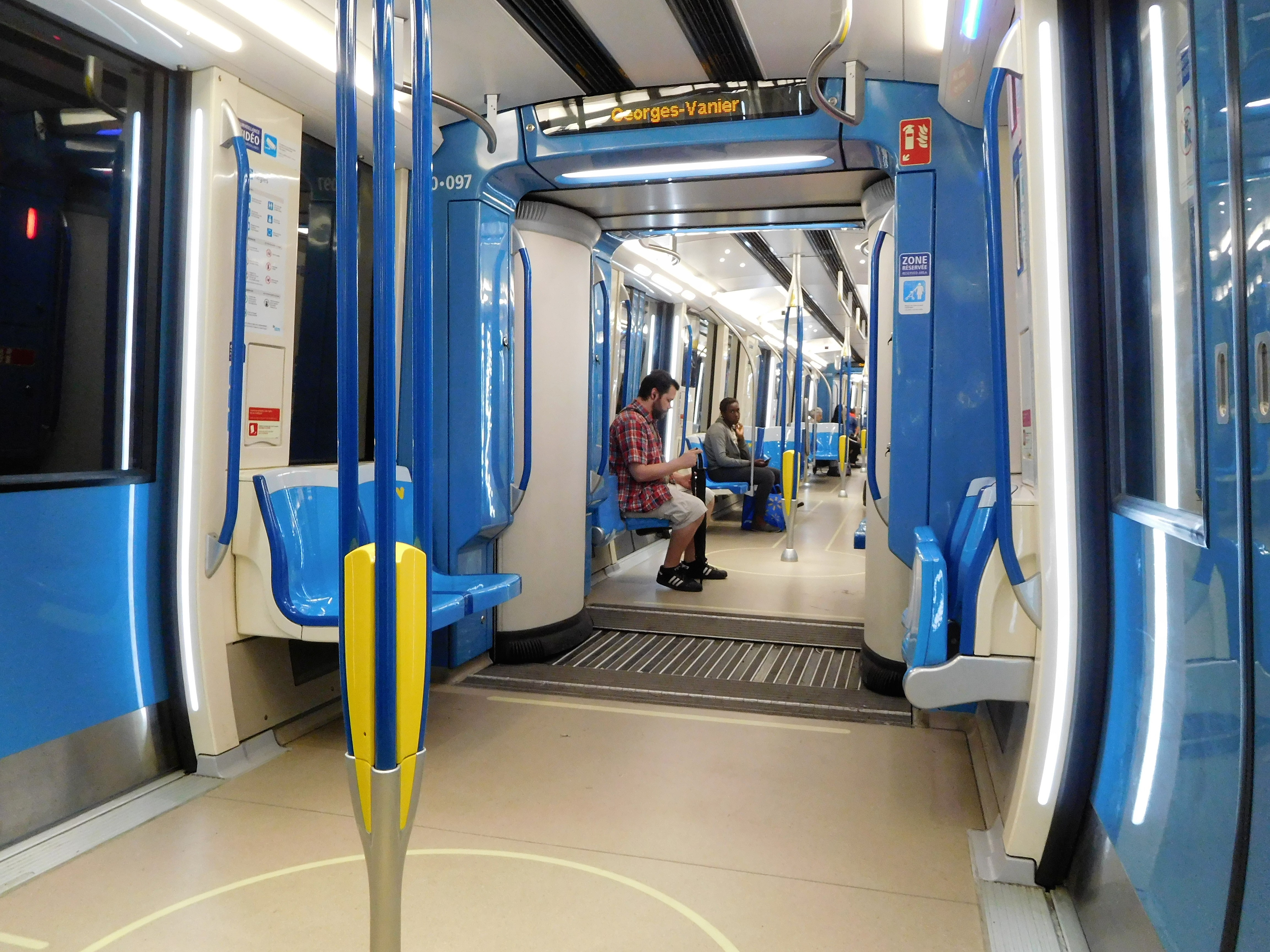
Open gangway of Azur

The MPM-10 Azur features full-width open-gangways between the cars which can be occupied by passengers, resulting in 8% more train capacity than previous trains.

The trains are equipped with an air suspension system, larger windows and wider doors. Wheelchair spaces are also provided, although the majority of Metro stations are not yet wheelchair-accessible. In the cabin, the trains also feature more natural lighting, high definition televisions, a new PA system and surveillance cameras. Improved ventilation is also featured; however, as with Montreal's previous generation rolling stock, cars are not air conditioned. Instead they are equipped with adjustable passenger force ventilation systems which deploy outside air into the train fast to create a cooler environment.

The MPM-10 uses Alstom OPTONIX IGBT–VVVF traction control assembled in the United States. The MPM-10 Azur can run faster than the maximum speed of the former MR-63, and the current MR-73 trains, they can run as fast as 100 kilometres per hour (62 mph) due to its enhanced motors. Given the higher capacity of the MPM-10, the trains are heavier than the outgoing MR-63s at 238 t (26.4 t per car).

== Lines serviced ==
Green Line (since 2017)

Orange Line (since 2016)

=== Formation ===
Currently (As of December 2021)

Lines #	Colour	Number of trains	Composition	Comments
1		26 sets (234 cars)	{10-xx1} + 10-xx2 + 10-xx3 + 10-xx4 + 10-xx5 + 10-xx6 + 10-xx7 + 10-xx8 + {10-xx9}	The MR-73 and MPM-10 Azur trains replaced the historic MR-63s.
2		45 sets (405 cars)	{10-xx1} + 10-xx2 + 10-xx3 + 10-xx4 + 10-xx5 + 10-xx6 + 10-xx7 + 10-xx8 + {10-xx9}	Only MPM-10 Azur trains
