= Gangway connection =

Flexible passageway between train cars

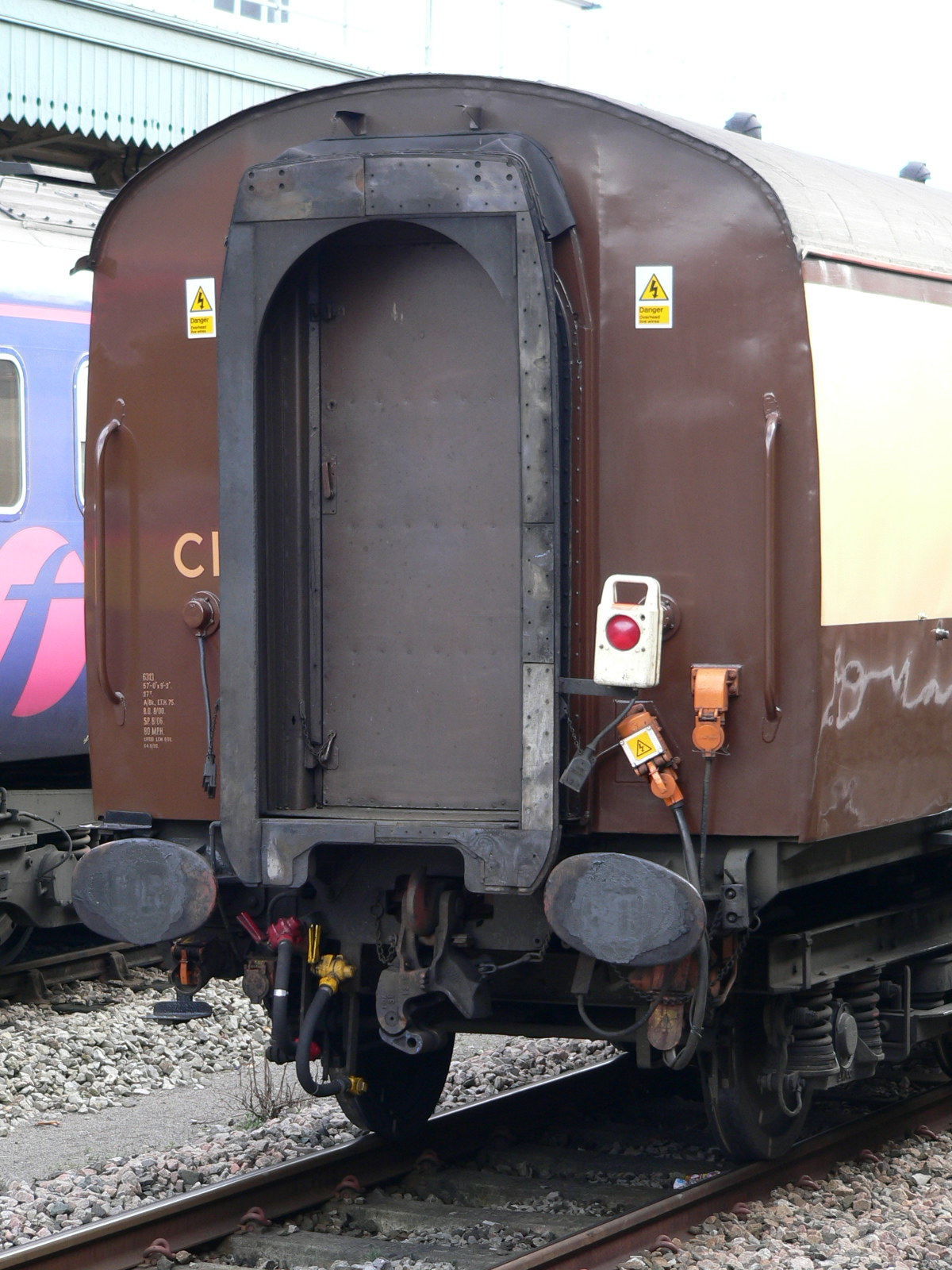
A British Railways Mark 1 coach fitted with a gangway connection of the Pullman type

Cab end gangway arrangements

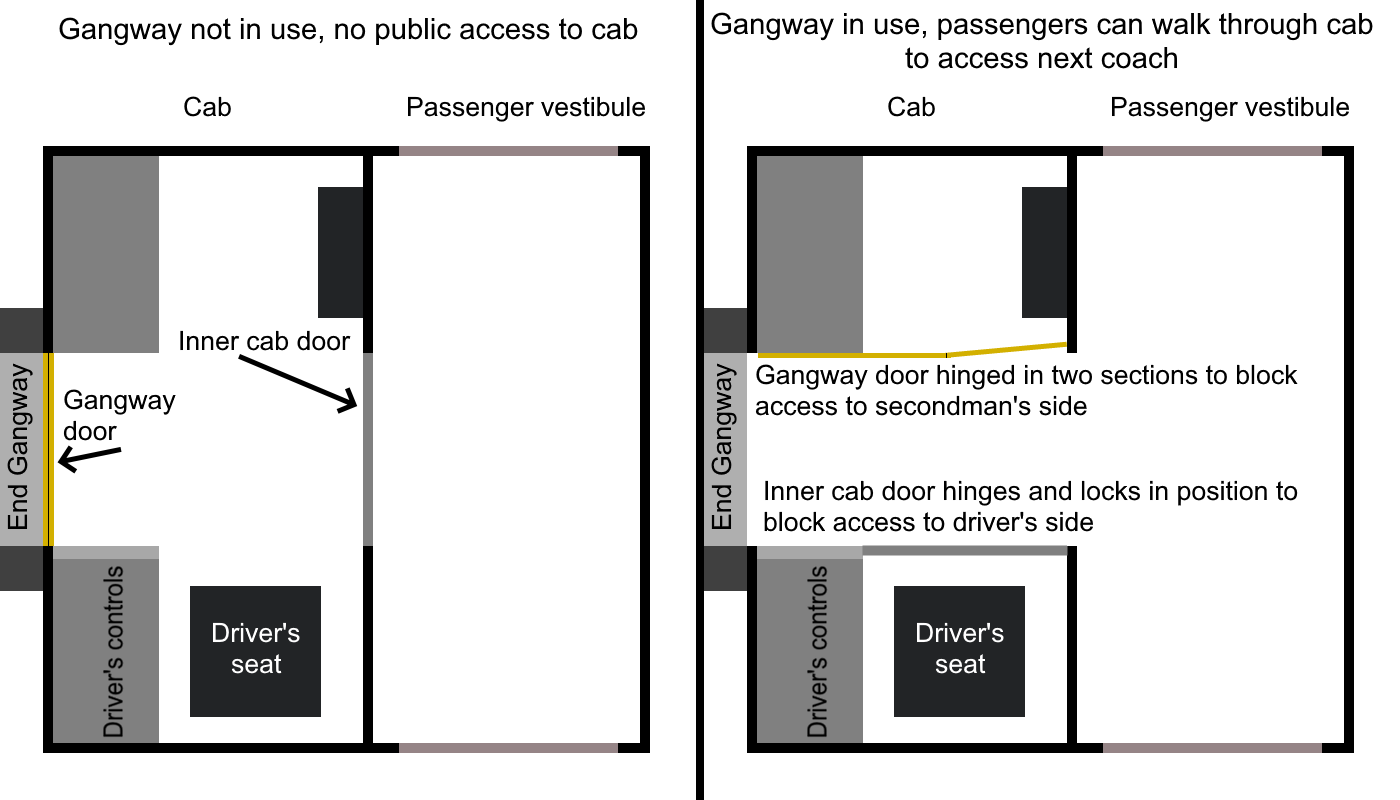
Diagram demonstrating the typical cab layout for a British Rail Sprinter DMU where the cab ends are fitted with end gangways and how the doors are arranged so that the centre of the cab can be accessed by passengers while the gangway is in use.

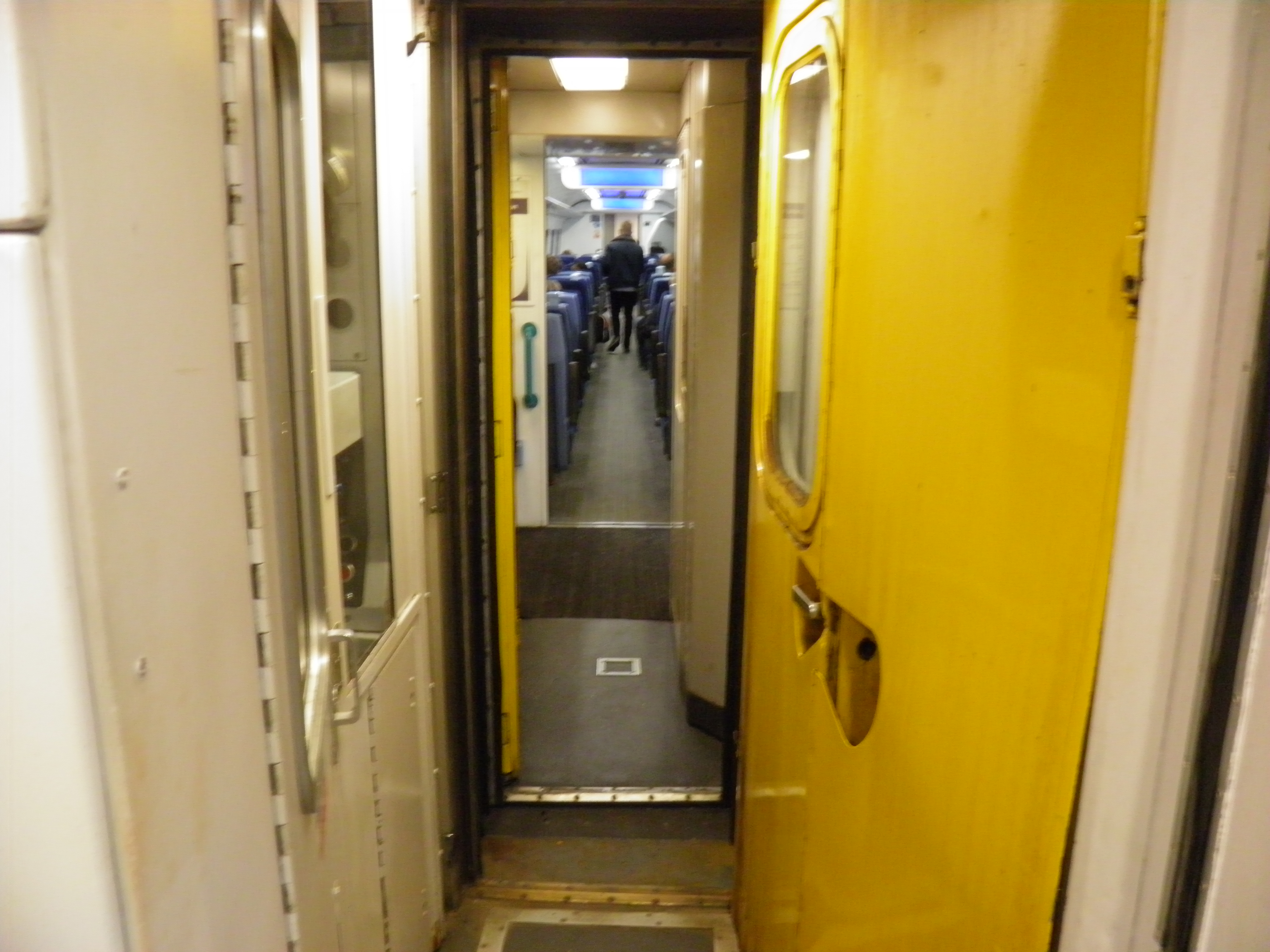
A photograph showing the demonstrated gangway door arrangement in use between a British Rail Class 153 (foreground) coupled to the cab end of a British Rail Class 158 (background). Other trains may have similar arrangements to restrict public access to the driver's controls whilst still permitting access to the end door in order to access other coaches while the vehicle is coupled.

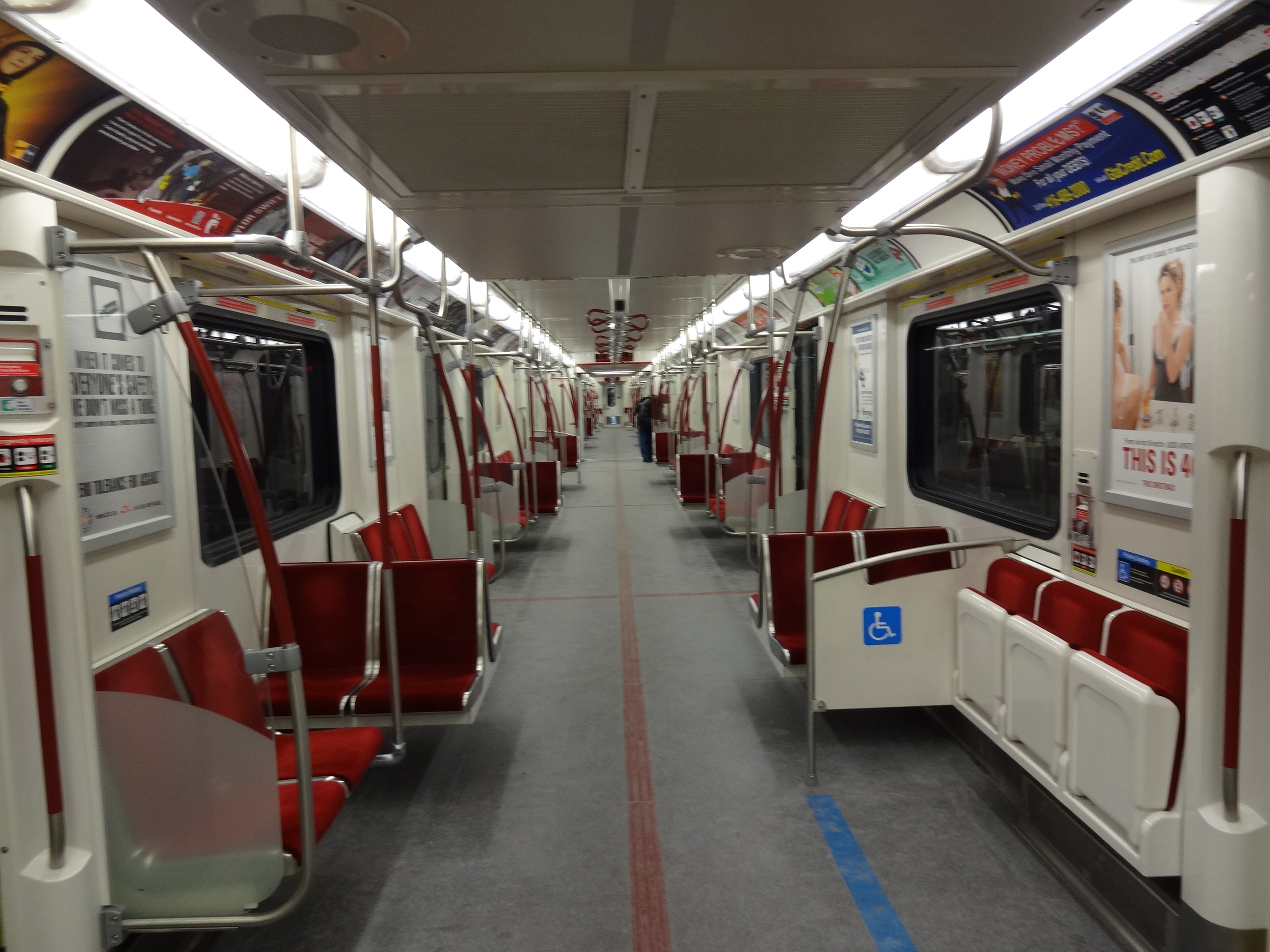
View along full length of a Toronto Rocket, folding seats at the right

A gangway connection or corridor connection is a flexible connector fitted to the end of a railway coach, enabling passengers to move between coaches without danger of falling from the train.

== Origins: Coaches in British and American railways ==
The London and North Western Railway (LNWR) was the first British railway to provide passengers with the means to move from one coach to another while the train was in motion. In 1869 the LNWR built a pair of saloons for the use of Queen Victoria; these had six-wheel underframes (the bogie coach did not appear in Britain until 1872), and the gangway was fitted to only one end of each coach. The Queen preferred to wait until the train had stopped before using the gangway.

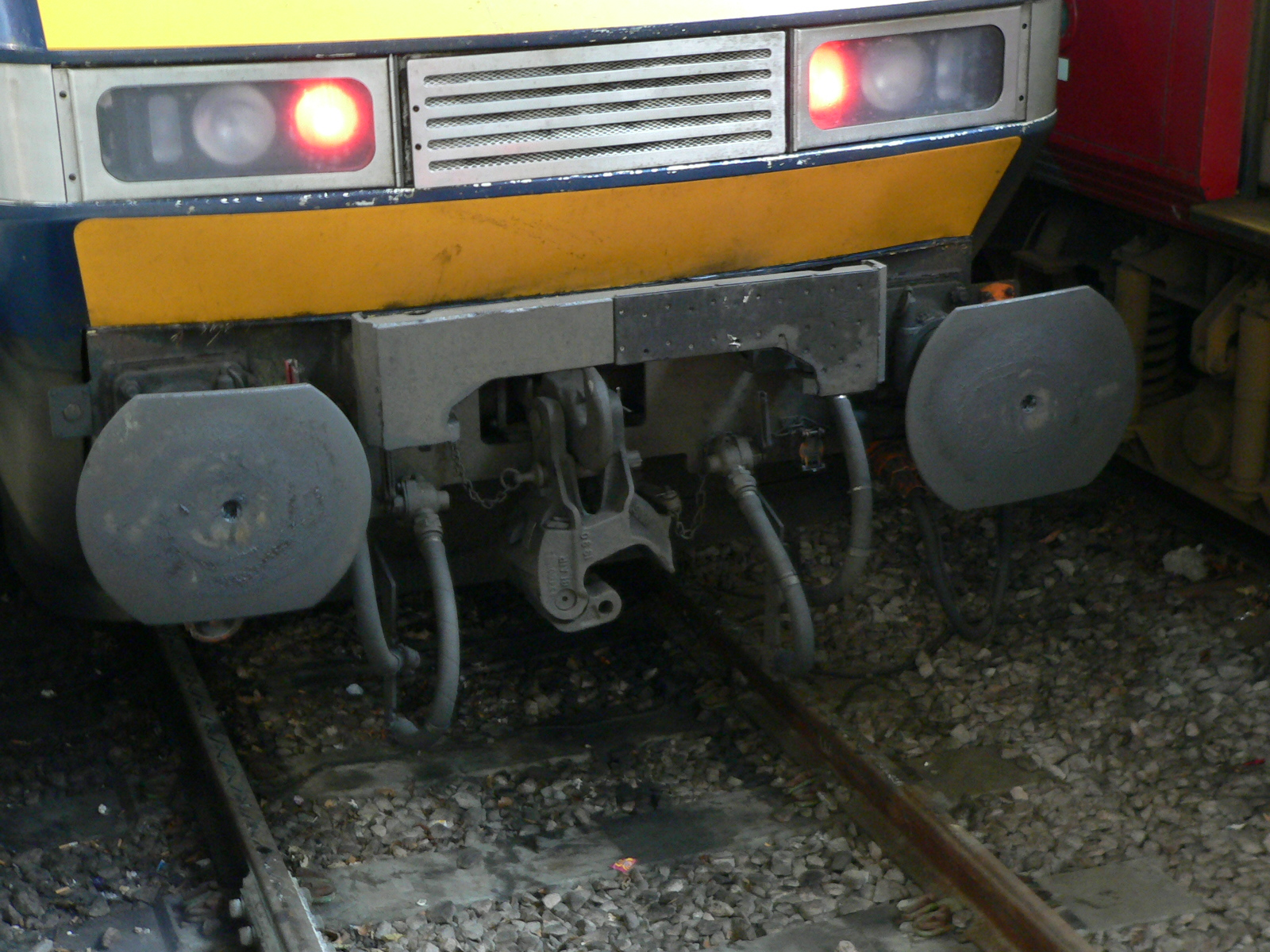
This British locomotive has a centre buffing plate similar to that fitted to the lower portion of a Pullman-type gangway connection.

In 1887, George M. Pullman introduced his patented vestibule cars. Older railroad cars had open platforms at their ends, which were used both for joining and leaving the train, but could also be used to step from one car to the next. This practice was dangerous, and so Pullman decided to enclose the platform to produce the vestibule. For passing between cars, there was a passageway in the form of a steel-framed rectangular diaphragm mounted on a buffing plate above the centre coupler. The vestibule prevented passengers from falling out, and protected passengers from the weather when passing between cars. In the event of an accident, the design also helped prevent cars from overriding each other, reducing the risk of telescoping. Pullman's vestibule cars were first used in 1887. Among the first to use them was the Pennsylvania Railroad on the Pennsylvania Limited service to Chicago.

The Great Northern Railway introduced the Gould-design gangway connection to Great Britain in 1889, when E.F. Howlden was Carriage and Wagon Superintendent.

In March 1892, the Great Western Railway (GWR) introduced a set of gangwayed coaches on their Paddington to Birkenhead service. Built to the design of William Dean, it was the first British side-corridor train to have gangway connections between all the coaches, although they were provided not to enable passengers to move around the train, but rather to allow the guard to reach any compartment quickly. Electric bells were provided so that he could be summoned. When the guard was not so required, he kept the communicating doors locked. Passengers could still use the side-corridor within the coach to reach the toilet.

The gangway connections of the early GWR corridor coaches were offset to one side. Some coaches intended for use at the ends of trains had the gangway connection fitted at one end only. The GWR introduced restaurant cars in 1896; gangway connections were fitted, but passengers wishing to use the restaurant car were expected to board it at the start of their journey, and remain there: the connections were still not for public use.

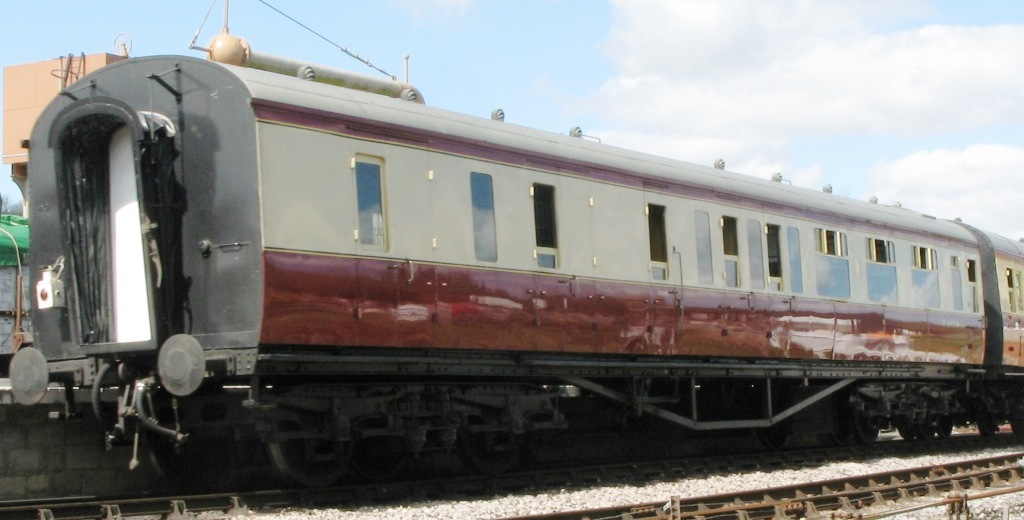
A GWR coach fitted with a British Standard gangway connection of the "suspended" type

In May 1923, the GWR introduced some new coaches on their South Wales services; some of these coaches had British Standard gangway connections and screw couplers as used on many other GWR coaches; some had Pullman-type gangway connections and Laycock "buckeye" couplers; and there were some with one type at one end, and the other end having the other type. In 1925 the GWR started to use the "suspended" form of gangway connection instead of the "scissors" pattern. From 1938, GWR coaches which were expected to need coupling to LNER or SR coaches were fitted with gangway adaptors, to allow the dissimilar types to be connected.

From the beginning, the London, Midland and Scottish Railway used the British Standard type of gangway connector, with its "scissors" pattern as used by the GWR. Some coaches needed for LNER or SR lines were given gangway adaptors, so that they could safely couple to coaches fitted with the Pullman-type gangway.

On the formation of British Railways on 1 January 1948, operators decided to produce a new range of standard coaches, instead of perpetuating existing designs—but the new types had to be compatible with the old. Two of the pre-BR companies (the GWR and the London, Midland and Scottish Railway) favoured the British Standard gangway, whereas the other two (the London and North Eastern Railway and the Southern Railway) used the Pullman type. In the design of their new Mark 1 coaches, British Railways decided to standardise on the Pullman type in view of its resistance to telescoping.

These gangways consisted of a flat steel plate, having a large aperture for the passageway. At the bottom it was riveted to the buffing plate, whilst the top was supported on the coach end by two telescopic spring units. On the coach end was a wooden doorframe; this was connected to the faceplate by a flexible diaphragm made from plasticised asbestos. When two coaches were coupled, a curtain was used to cover the inside surfaces of the diaphragms and faceplates. The doorframe was fitted with a lockable door, of either sliding or hinged type, depending on the interior layout of that end of the coach.

=== Travelling post offices ===
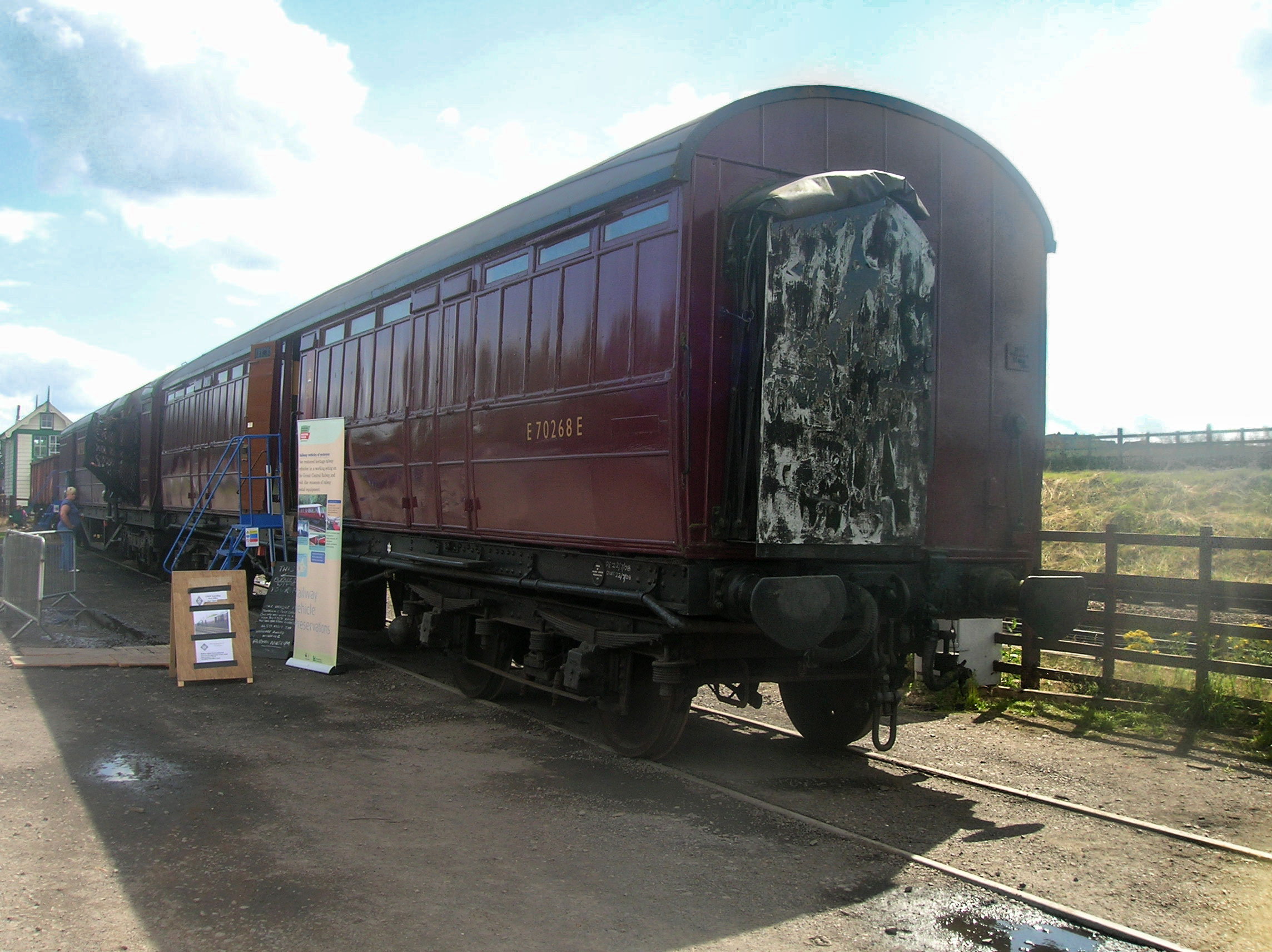
A preserved LNER post office stowage tender with offset gangway connection

Coaches built for travelling post office (TPO) services normally had their gangway connections offset to one side. There were two main reasons: there was a perceived security risk should these coaches be coupled to ordinary passenger-carrying coaches, the differing gangway positions minimising the risk of intrusion; and more space was available for sorting tables, the postal workers being able to walk in a straight line between vans without disturbing the sorters.

A disadvantage was that when a van was added to a TPO train, it might need to be turned around before it could be used. After the formation of British Railways, most new Mark 1 TPO vans were provided with centre gangways, though a batch intended to work with older vans were given offset gangways. These were altered to the standard arrangement in 1973. Until then, they had been the only BR Mark 1 gangwayed coaches not to have the Pullman gangway.

== Locomotives (corridor tenders) ==
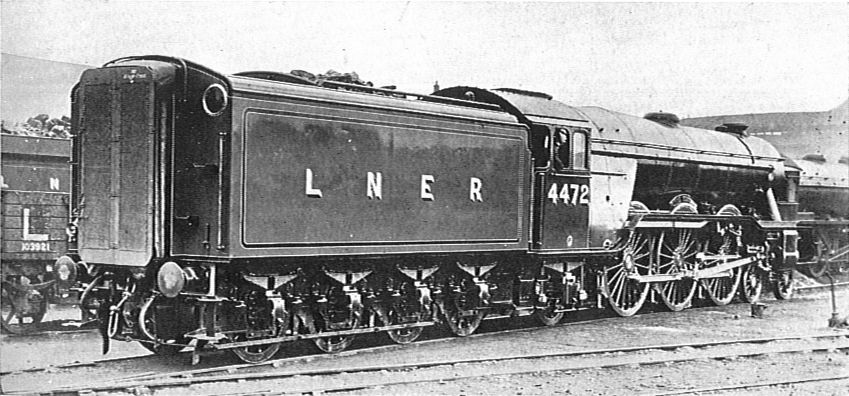
LNER Class A1 4-6-2 with corridor tender. Circular window of passageway at upper right of tender rear.

A corridor tender is special type of locomotive tender with a passageway along one side to allow crew to pass between the locomotive cab and the front coach of the train. It was introduced to enable crew changes while the train is in service.

The London and North Eastern Railway (LNER) decided that from the start of their summer timetable on 1 May 1928, the Flying Scotsman service would run non-stop over the 392.7 miles (632.0 km) between London King's Cross and Edinburgh Waverley. The locomotives to be used were of that railway's class A1, and the schedule was for the journey to be completed in 8 1/4 hours. This was too long to allow a single crew to handle the train without a rest; means were therefore sought by which the crew could be changed at approximately the half-way point.

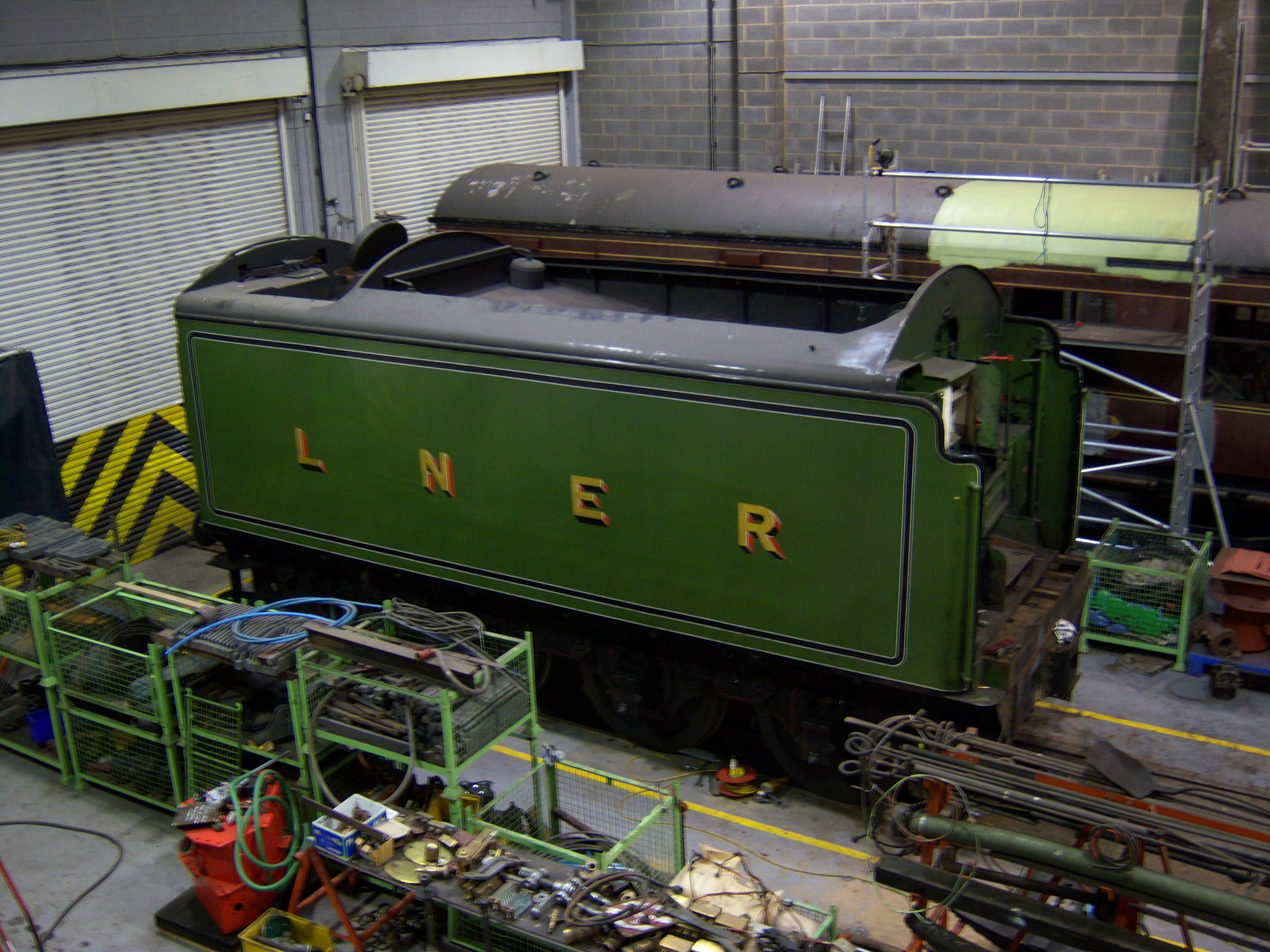
A preserved corridor tender. The passageway runs along the side closest to the camera; the top of the passageway may be seen at the rear (left)

The LNER's locomotive design team, headed by Nigel Gresley, produced a new design of tender that was slightly longer than the old, but built as high and wide as possible without compromising the loading gauge. A passageway was incorporated along the right-hand side, and at the rear end a Pullman type gangway connection was fitted, together with a buckeye coupler, both of which were compatible with LNER coaches. The gangway was of concertina pattern, and was pressed against the corresponding gangway on the leading coach by means of sprung pistons.

Although a normal gangway connection was used, the passageway through the tender was only 5 feet (1.52 m) high and 18 inches (0.46 m) wide, and the floor of the passage was 2 feet (0.61 m) above the bottom of the water tank, requiring two steps at both ends. The passageway was illuminated by a single circular window in the tender rear panel, placed high up and to the right of the corridor connection. Ten of these tenders were placed in service between April and September 1928, of which three were attached to new locomotives of Class A3; two were attached to existing Class A3 locomotives, and five attached to Class A1 locomotives. The design was patented by Gresley in August 1928.

In service, the relief crew travelled in the front coach of the train, and as the train approached the half-way point, they left their seats and made their way forward through the corridor tender to the locomotive cab. On their arrival, the previous crew then handed over the controls and went back to the seats in the train vacated by the relief crew.

Another corridor tender (Number 5484) was built in 1929 for use with the new Class W1 4-6-4 no. 10000; four more were built in 1935 with the first four locomotives of the new Class A4, and a final seven were built with the 1937 batch of Class A4 locomotives, making a total of 22. The original ten were reconditioned in 1936–1937 and attached to other Class A4 locomotives. In May 1948, the 1929-built corridor tender was transferred to a locomotive of Class A4, after which all 22 remained with this class until withdrawal.

== Open gangways in urban transit ==
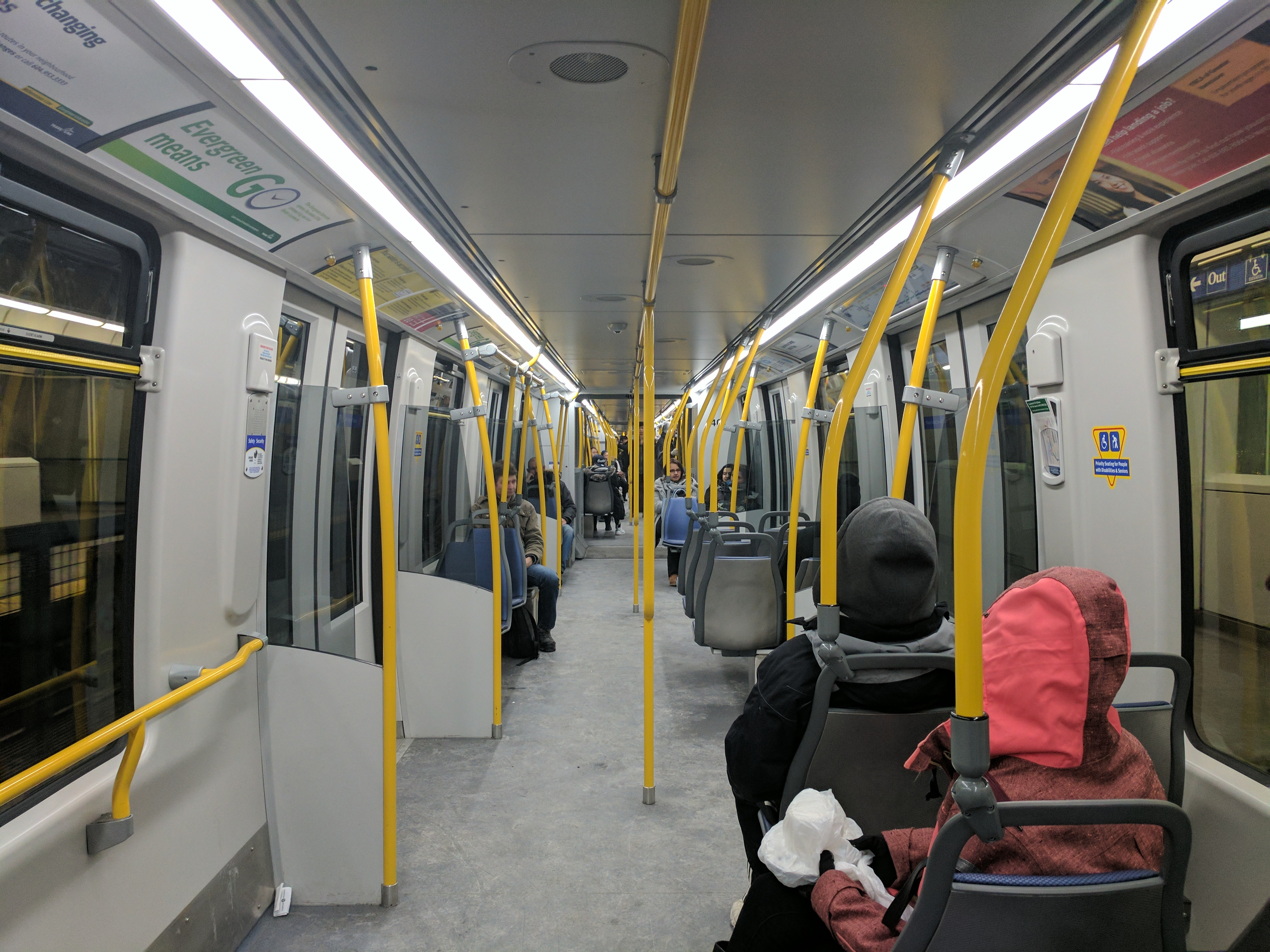
Interior view of the Vancouver SkyTrain Bombardier Innovia Metro 300 (Mark III)

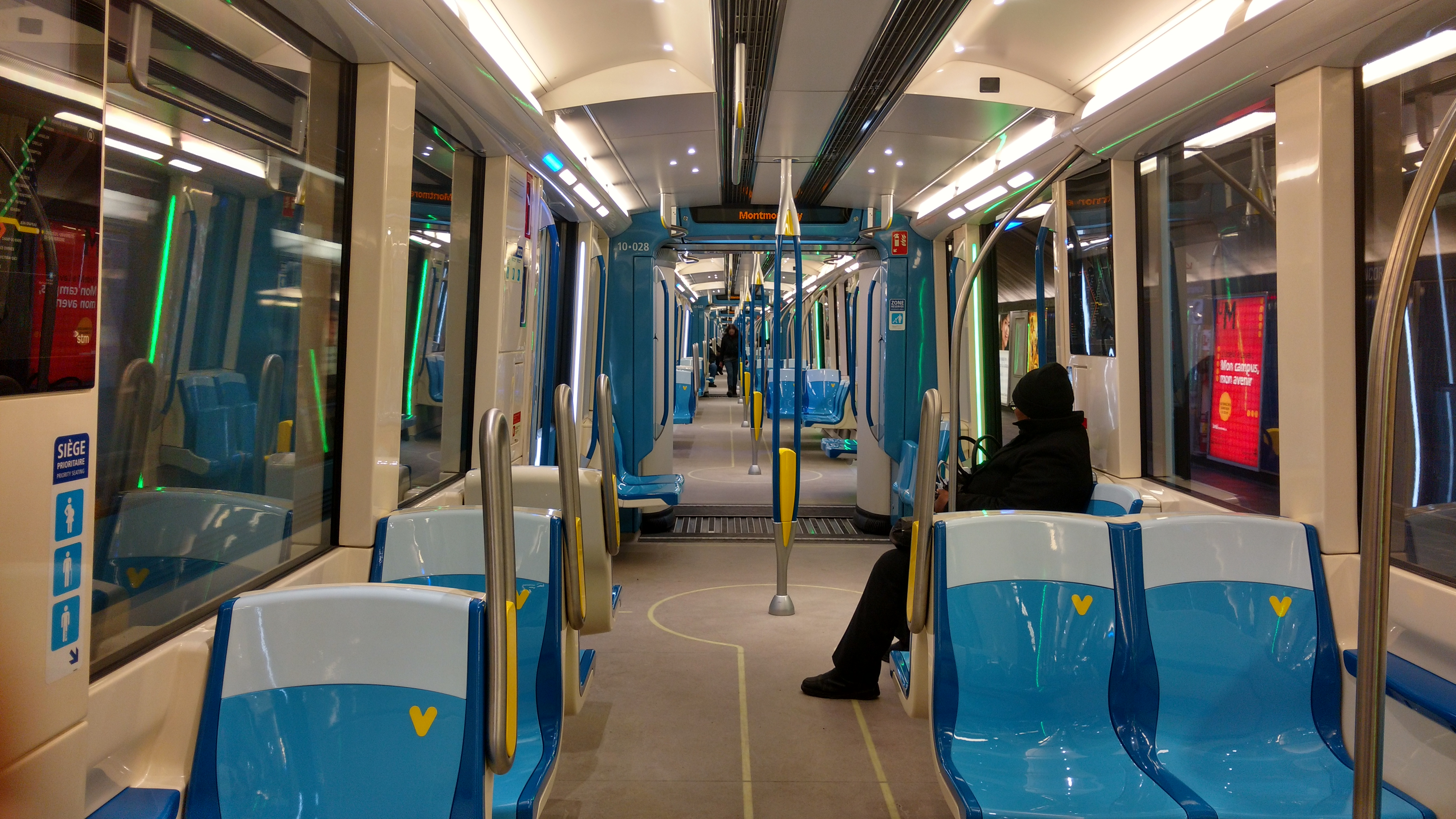
Interior view of the MPM-10 Azur train

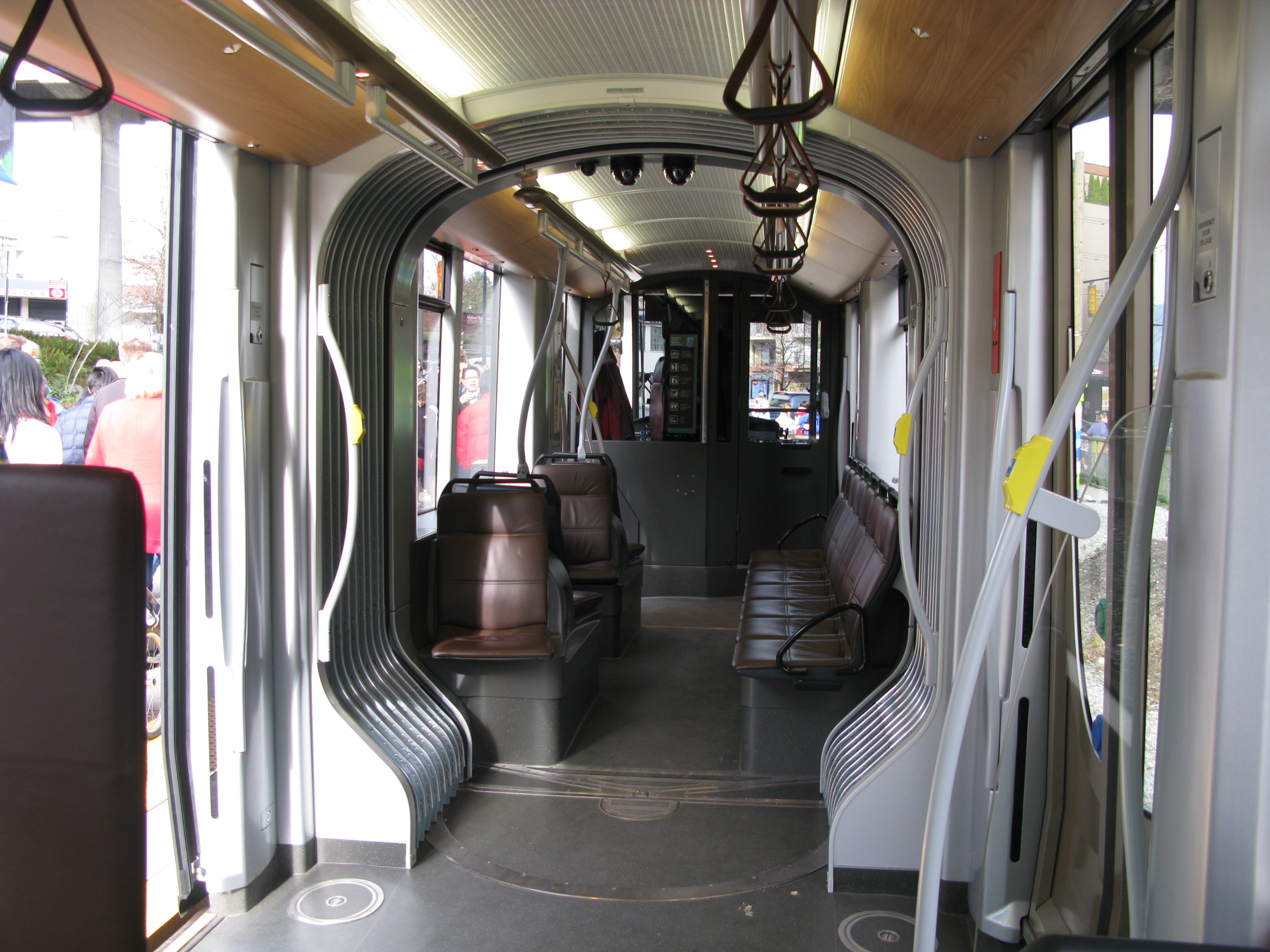
Open gangway on a Bombardier Flexity Outlook tram

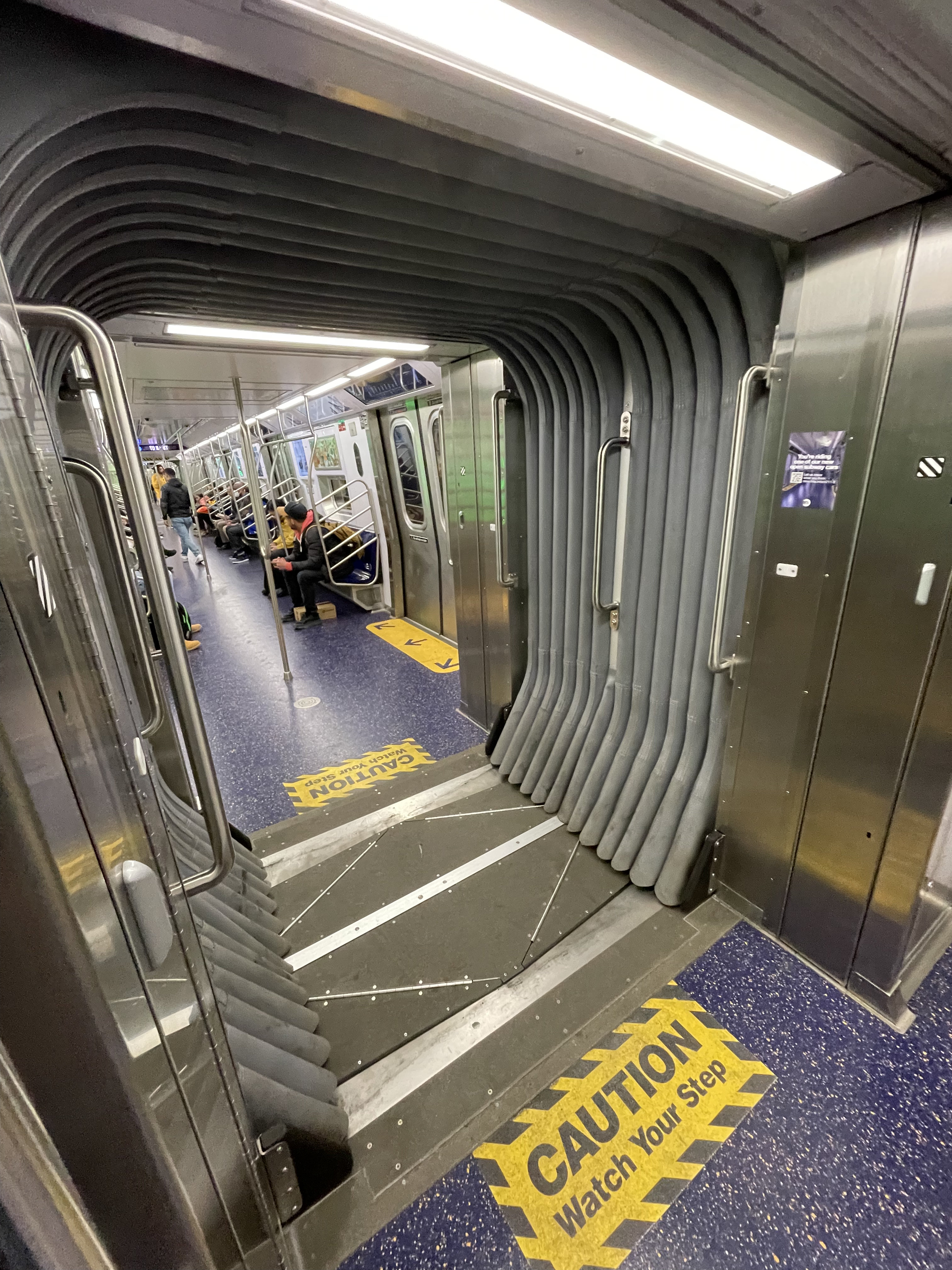
Open gangway on an R211T

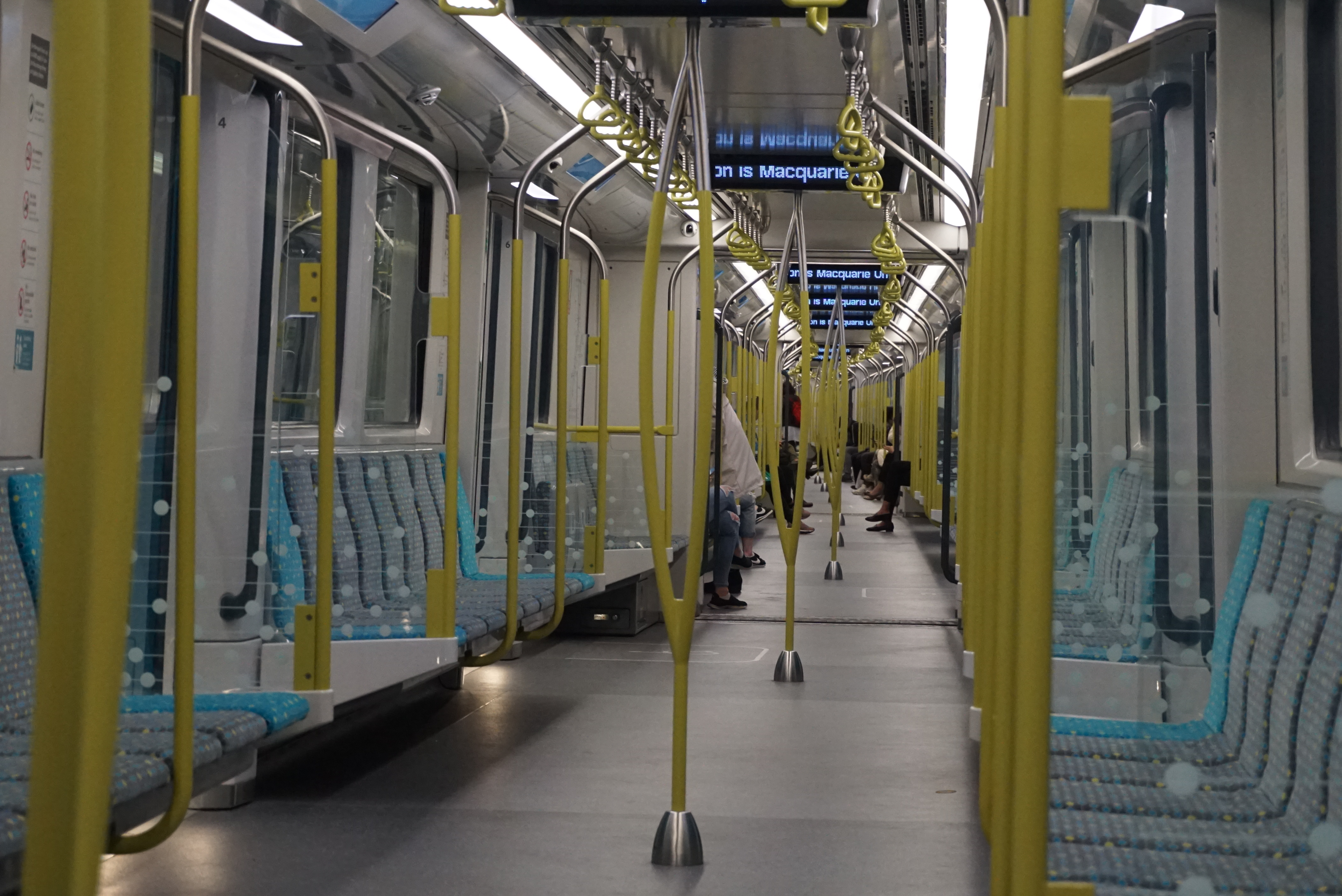
Interior of a Sydney Metro Alstom Metropolis TS set

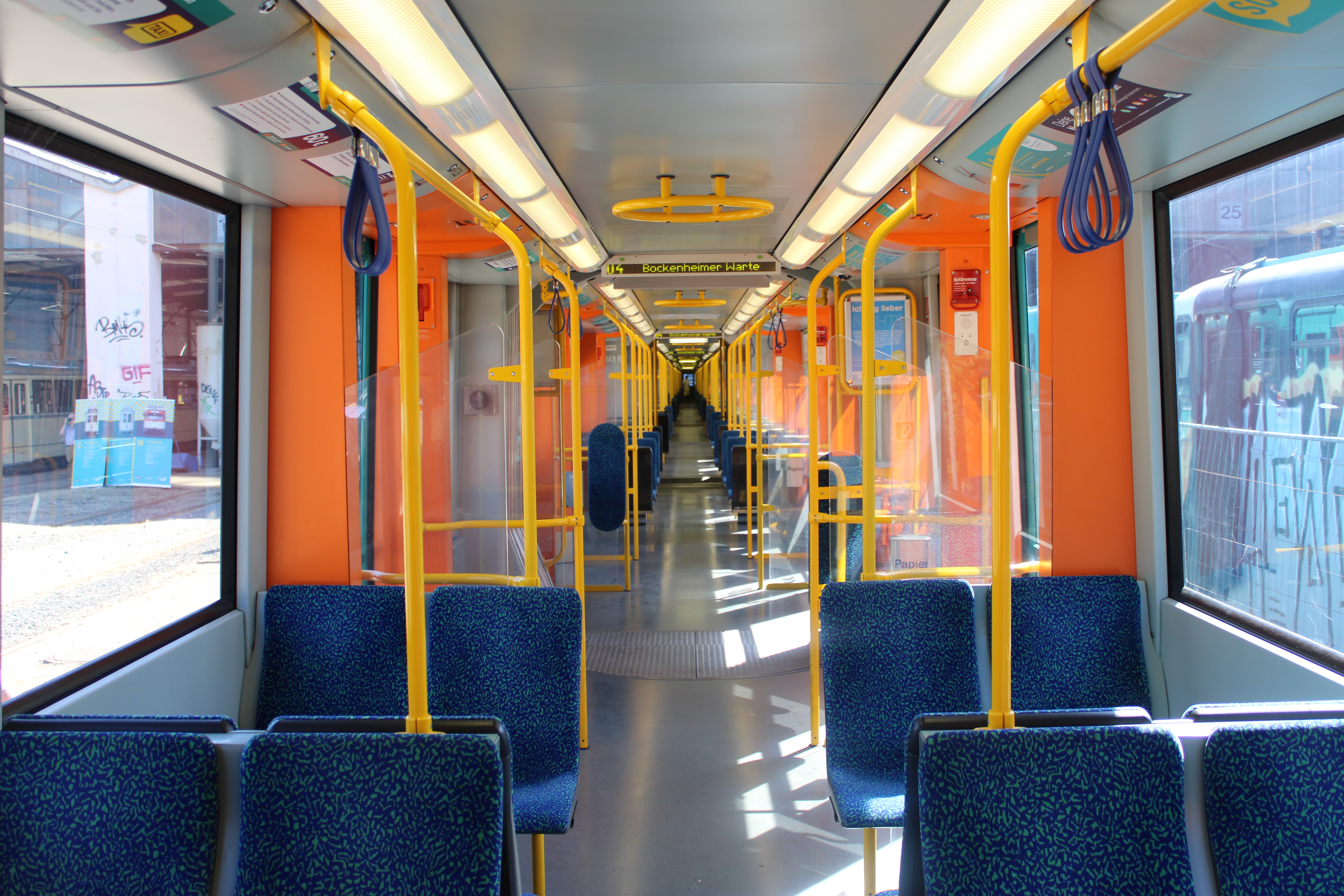
View through a 4-car train of type U5 of Frankfurt U-Bahn

In urban transit, open gangways are most commonly used in light rail and trams, where the railcars are divided into two or more sections linked by gangways. Articulated buses similarly have extensions connected with a gangway. Open gangways have also become increasingly used for heavy rail rapid transit rolling stock. It provides a way to seamlessly move between cars at any time, without passing through doors and a dangerous open area that is often against the rules. It also raises the capacity of metro cars by about 10%, a significant improvement for systems such as the New York City Subway where infrastructure and timetables are at capacity.

The NYC Subway was the first transit authority in the world to have a subway / metro system with open gangways, with the Multi-Section Articulated Cars (1925 - 1965), then operated by the Brooklyn–Manhattan Transit Corporation. Until the late 2010s, cars like these were not purchased again, as they needed constant repair, and crime was increasing in NYC at the time, resulting in locked doors between subway cars. RATP was the first European authority to order open gangway cars for Paris Metro, with Bombardier MF 88 and GEC Alsthom MP 89 (as NS 93 for Santiago Metro); it was followed by Metrovalencia FGV 3900, Madrid Metro AnsaldoBreda 7000 and CAF 8000, and Rome Metro MA-300 (CAF S/300).

In North America, the Toronto Transit Commission (TTC) was the second transit authority to use open gangway rolling stock, with its Toronto Rocket railcars (a variant of the Bombardier Movia line of open-gangway cars) delivered to the Toronto subway system from 2010 to 2015. The Société de Transport de Montréal (STM) upgraded its fleet of subway cars with Azur (MPM-10) trains that included open gangways. Montreal Metro took delivery of the Bombardier/Alstom MPM-10 Azur trains in 2016.

The Metropolitan Transportation Authority (MTA) has ordered 20 experimental open gangway cars as part of the NYC Subway's R211 order. These began running on the C line on February 1, 2024. The order initially consists of 545 cars, of which 20 are the open gangway prototype sets. There are two designs, the first ten cars utilizing interior panels in the gangway connection, and the other ten cars using interior bellows in the gangway connection. The latter design also contains a wider walkway and handles between cars. In December 2024, the MTA ordered 80 more "hard shell" R211T cars as part of the second option order.

While not technically an open gangway because of the use of doors, BART permits passengers to walk between cars via a more traditional gangway connection. This has been a feature since its opening in 1972.

The open gangway design has been incorporated into Alstom Metropolis, Bombardier Movia and Innovia Metro, Siemens Inspiro, 81-760 Oka, and 81-765 Moskva trains which operate on a variety of subway systems around the world, such as Riyadh Metro (Inspiro, Innnovia, Metropolis); Singapore MRT (Metropolis, Movia); Delhi Metro (Movia), Barcelona Metro, Amsterdam Metro, Budapest Metro, Buenos Aires Underground, Sydney Metro (Metropolis); Vancouver SkyTrain (Innovia); London Underground (Inspiro New Tube for London, S Stock); Baku Metro (Oka, Moskva); and Tashkent Metro (Moskva).

Some trains, like U-Bahn BVG Class HK, S-Bahn DBAG Class 481, 81-740 Rusich etc. use open gangways only between car pairs or 3-car sets; recent versions of these trains, Class IK, Class 483 and 81-760 Oka/81-765 Moskva, employ full walkthrough gangway along entire train.

== Multiple units and TurboTrain (walk-through heads) ==
A walk-through head is a type of gangway connection that is installed in a train set that is intended to enable the passage from one train to the next when they are interconnected.

With most matched multiple-units, it is possible, as with locomotive-towed carriages, to walk from one unit to another, but a passage between adjacent cabbed ends of coupled trains is less common.

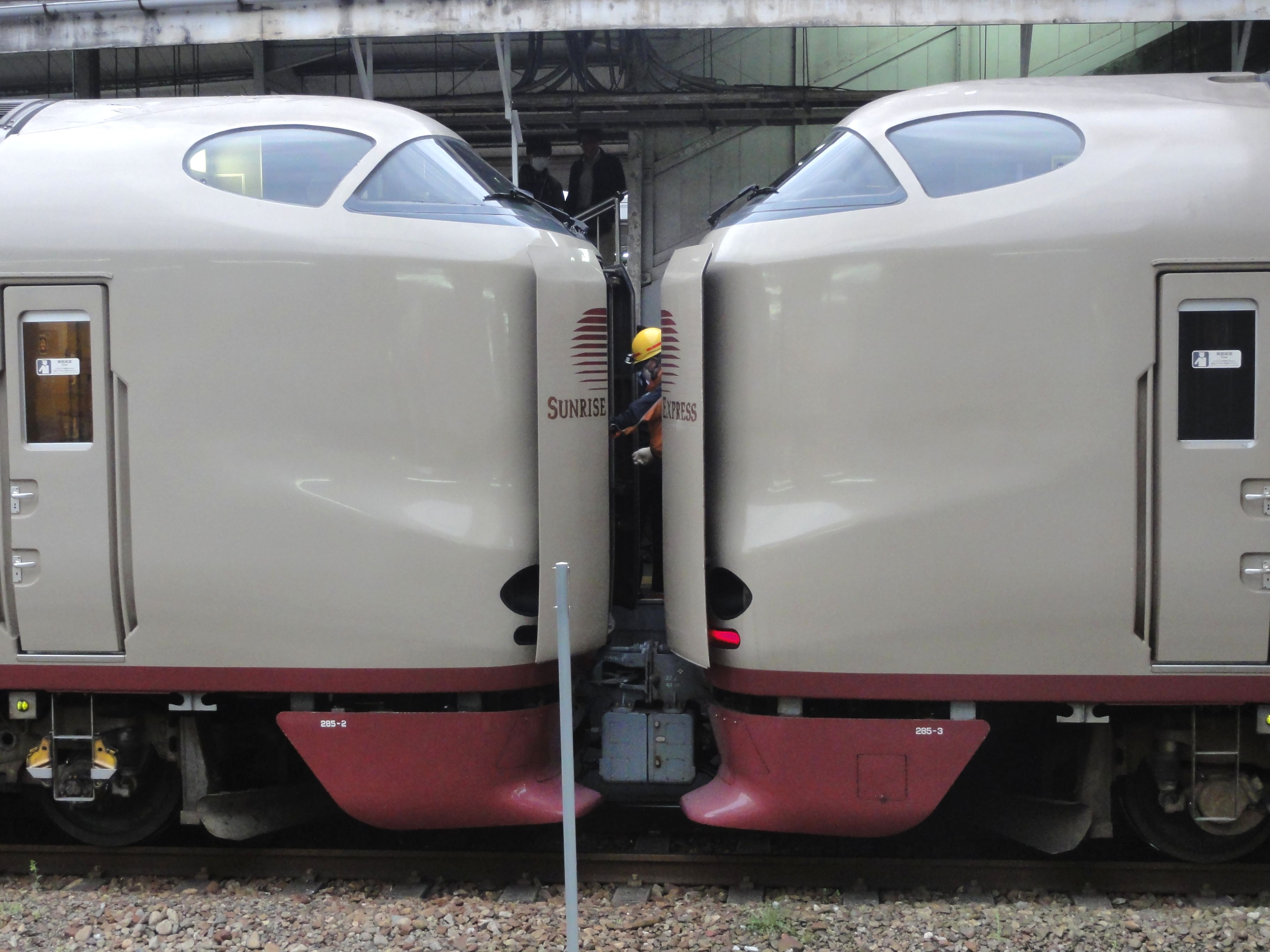
JR 285 series

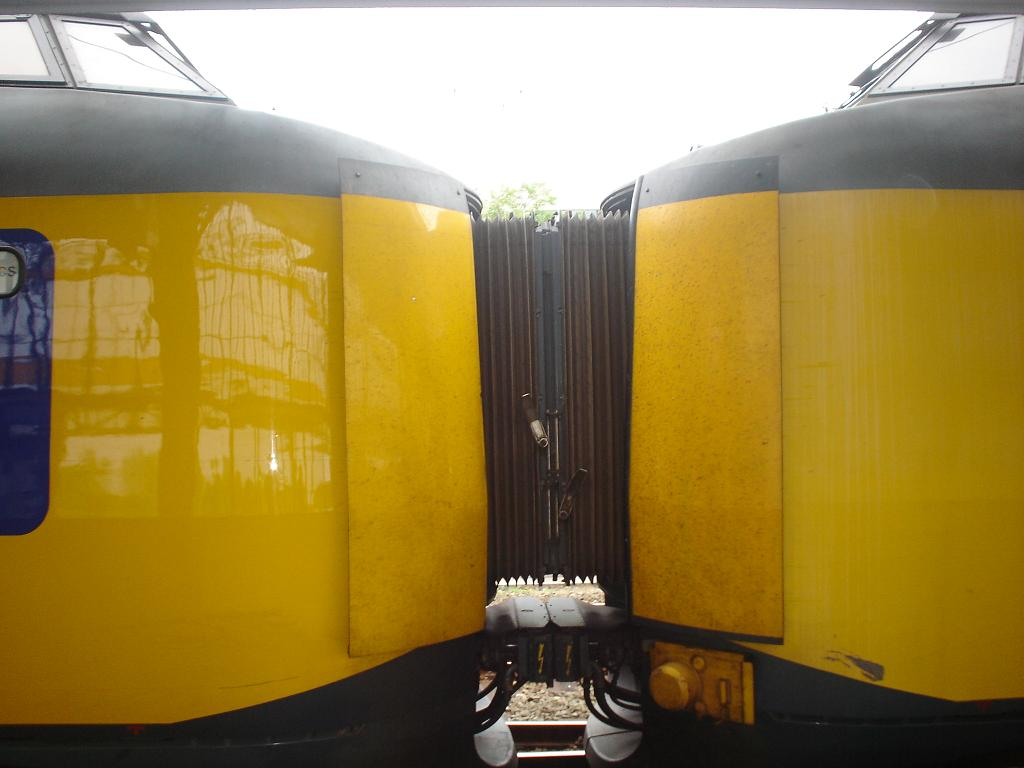
Dutch ICM (Removed during refurbishment)

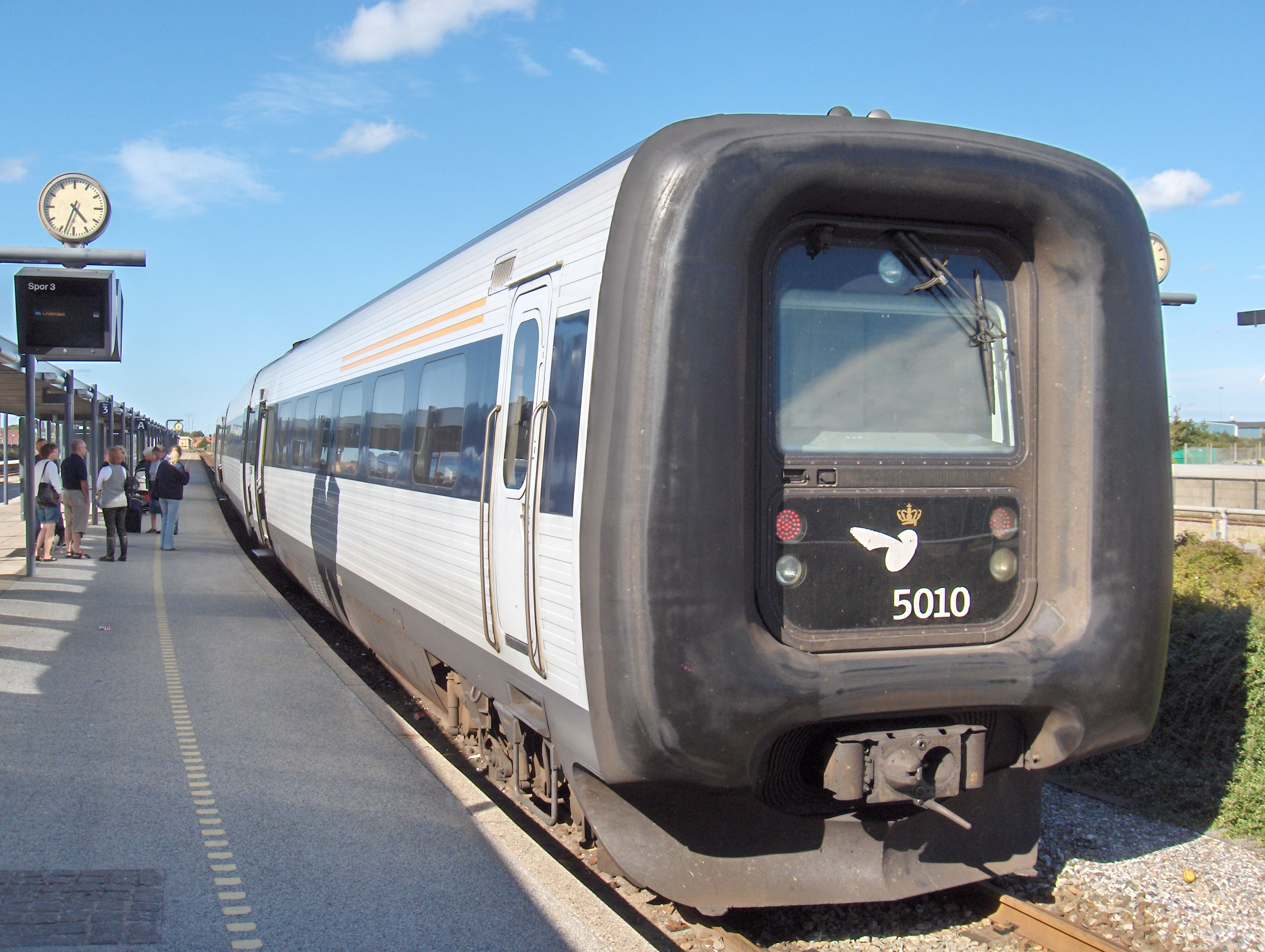
Danish DSB IC3

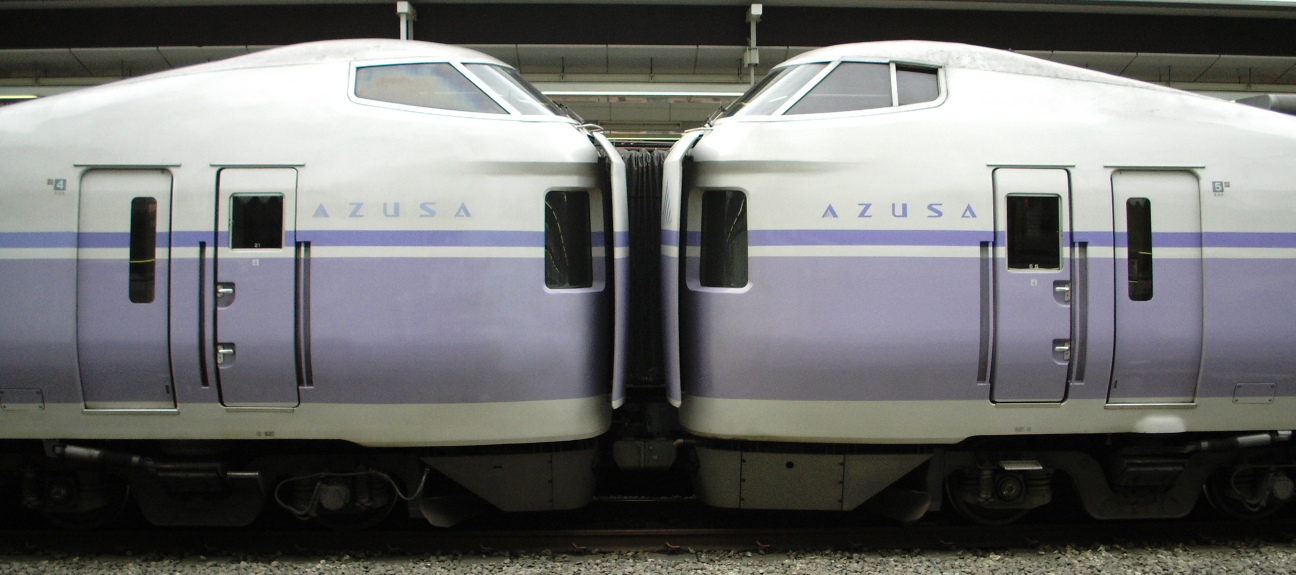
JR E351 series

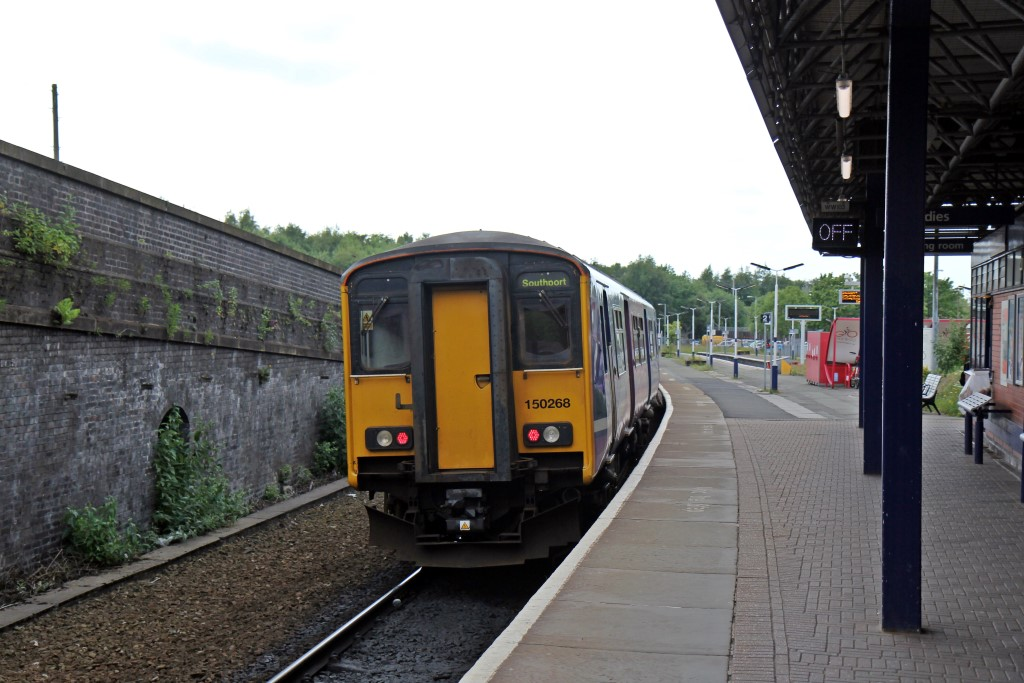
British Rail Class 150

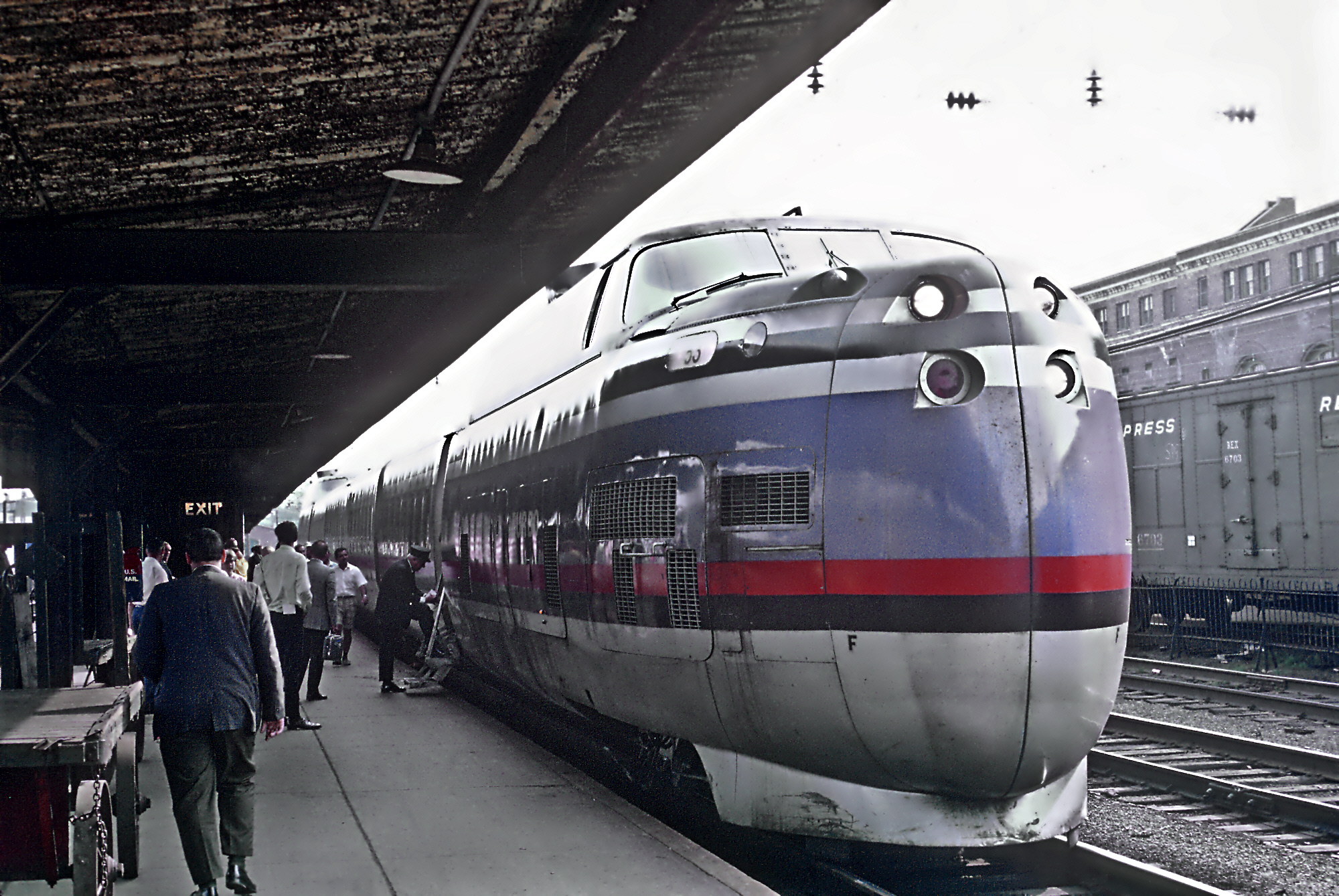
UAC TurboTrain power car

== See also ==
- Anticlimber
- Buffers and chain coupler
- Janney coupler
- Railway coupling
- SA3 coupler
- Tightlock coupler
- Vestibule
- Vestibuled train
