= AMF Technotransport =

Canadian railway maintenance facility

- Type: Subsidiary
- Industry: Rail transport
- Founded: 1899; 127 years ago
- Successor: Alstom
- Headquarters: Montreal, Quebec, Canada
- Area served: Worldwide
- Products: Locomotives; High-speed trains Intercity and commuter trains Trams; People movers Signalling systems

AMF Technotransport was a locomotive and railway rolling stock maintenance facility in Pointe-Saint-Charles, an area of Montreal, Quebec, Canada. It was originally the Pointe-Saint-Charles shops of Canadian National Railways (CNR) and became a separate subsidiary in 1993 under the name AMF Technotransport.

In 1995, CN awarded a contract to manage AMF to GEC-Alsthom. In 1996, CNR sold AMF to GEC-Alsthom. GEC-Alsthom subsequently changed its name to Alstom. By 1998, Alstom had dropped the AMF name and identified the facility as Alstom's Montreal remanufacturing centre or its Montreal rail centre.
