= SOFRETU =

French transport consulting firm

- Native name: Société française d'études et de réalisations de transports urbains
- Industry: Engineering
- Founded: 1961; 65 years ago
- Headquarters: France

SOFRETU (Société française d'études et de réalisations de transports urbains) was a French transport consulting and project development firm created in 1961 by the RATP.

It has been merged with Sofrerail - a SNCF branch, in 1995 and became Systra.

It has been notably involved in the metro planning for Montréal, Mexico City, Santiago de Chile and Tehran.
