= Terminus Henri-Bourassa =

Bus station in Montreal, Canada

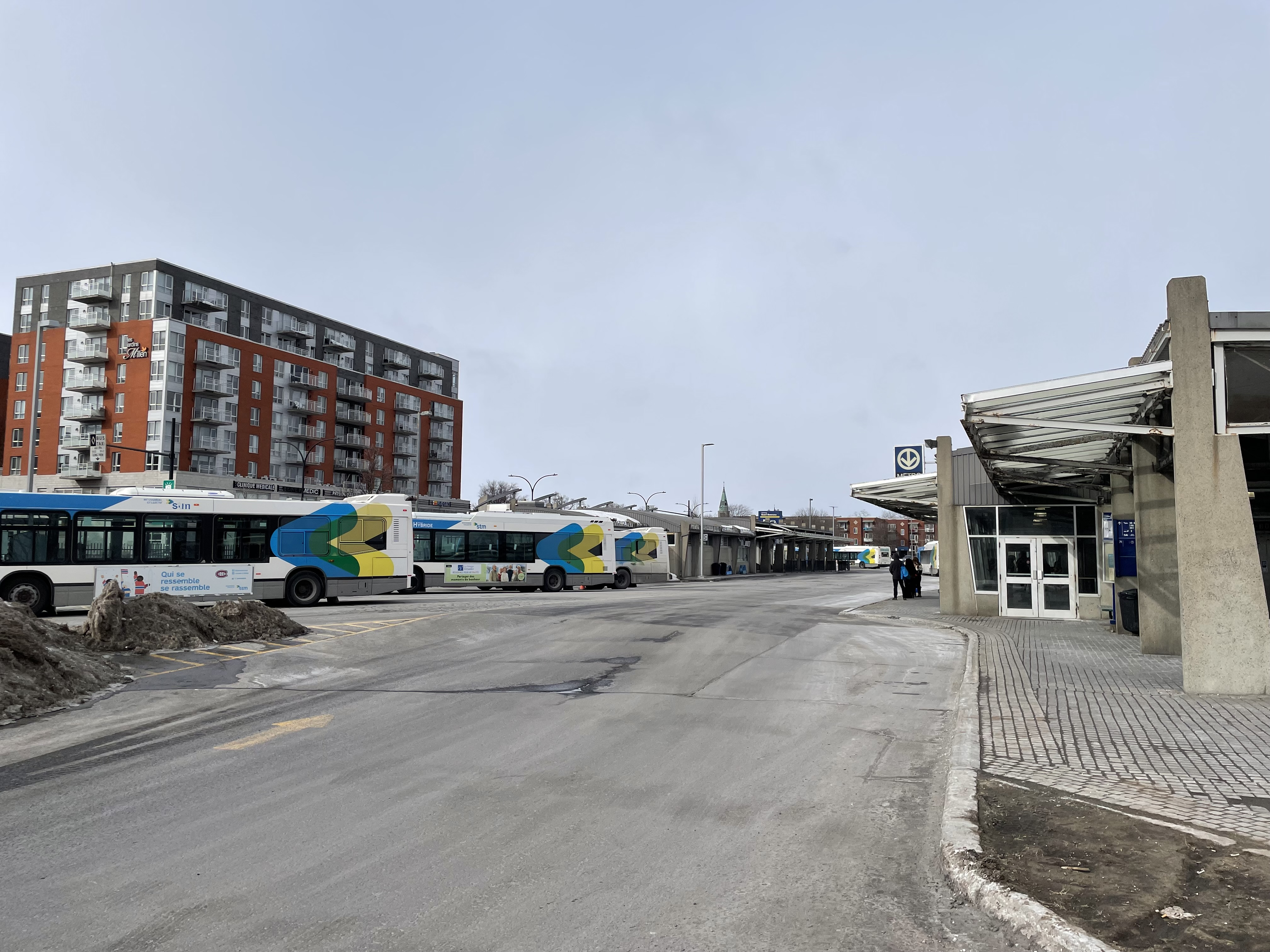
- Terminus Henri-Bourassa seen from Lajeuneese Street

General information
- Location: 590 bd Henri-Bourassa est
- Coordinates: 45°33′21″N 73°40′02″W
- Owner: ARTM
- Operator: Société de transport de Montréal
- Bus operators: STM bus; Société de transport de Laval; Exo bus services
- Connections: Henri-Bourassa

Construction
- Parking: None
- Cycle facilities: 67 places in racks

Other information
- Fare zone: ARTM: A

Passengers
- 2016: 235,100 (North); 5,918,700 (South) (Exo)
Location

Terminus Henri-Bourassa is a ARTM bus terminus located at 590 Henri Bourassa Boulevard East next to the Henri-Bourassa Metro station.

== Connecting bus routes ==
Before the Orange Line of the Montreal Metro was extended into Laval in 2007, 28 of the 34 Société de transport de Laval (STL) bus routes ended here, at the north terminal. Most of those routes (or their successors) were modified to terminate at either Montmorency or Cartier stations. Some inter municipal bus routes were also modified to take advantage of the closer stations. This left the old large north facility underutilised, and the waiting room (including the toilets) was closed as of Monday January 21, 2008, with the rest of the terminus closed in late 2015. All platforms at the rebuilt south annex are completely used by all buses.

=== Current bus routes ===
Société de transport de Montréal
No.	Route	Connects to	Service times / notes
13	Christophe-Colomb	Rosemont	Daily Starts/ends at Georges-Baril and Henri-Bourassa before 8PM weekdays
31	Saint-Denis	Sauvé; Crémazie; Jarry; Jean-Talon; Beaubien; Rosemont; Laurier; Mont-Royal; Sherbrooke	Daily
48	Perras	Rivière-des-Prairies; Pie-IX BRT	Daily Offers 48X variant with shorter route
49	Maurice Duplessis	Rivière-des-Prairies; Pie-IX BRT	Daily
55	Saint-Laurent	Place-d'Armes; Saint-Laurent; De Castelnau	Daily
56	St-Hubert	Jean-Talon; Beaubien; Rosemont	Daily
69	Henri-Bourassa	Pie-IX BRT; Bois-de-Boulogne; Du Ruisseau; Bois-Franc	Daily
79	Gouin	Sunnybrooke; Pierrefonds-Roxboro	Daily
164	Dudemaine	Bois-Franc; Bois-de-Boulogne	Daily
171	Henri-Bourassa	Côte-Vertu; Montpellier; Bois-de-Boulogne	Daily
361 ☾	Saint-Denis	Replaces the Orange Line from Henri-Bourassa to Place-d'Armes	Night service
363 ☾	Saint-Laurent	Henri-Bourassa; De Castelnau; Place-des-Arts (southbound); Saint-Laurent (northbound); Place-d'Armes	Night service
380 ☾	Henri-Bourassa	Bois-de-Boulogne; Montpellier; Côte-Vertu; Du Collège	Night service
469	Express Henri-Bourassa		Weekdays only
Société de transport de Laval
No.	Route	Connects to	Service times / notes
2 ♿︎	Métro Montmorency - Métro Henri-Bourassa	Cartier; De La Concorde; Montmorency	Late-night shuttle, no Sunday service
31 ♿︎	Métro Henri-Bourassa - Auteuil	Cartier	Daily
52	Métro Henri-Bourassa - Saint-François	Pie-IX BRT	Daily
55	Métro Henri-Bourassa - Laval-Ouest	Du Ruisseau	Weekdays only
252	Métro Henri-Bourassa - Saint-François	Pie-IX BRT	Weekdays, peak only
335	Métro Henri-Bourassa - Vimont		One departure only per directionDaily
Exo Terrebonne-Mascouche sector
No.	Route	Connects to	Service times / notes
25	Terrebonne - Montréal	Terminus Terrebonne; Pie-IX BRT	Weekdays only

== Nearby points of interest ==
- Aréna Ahuntsic
- Bibliothèque Ahuntsic
- Cégep Bois-de-Boulogne
  (with STM buses 164 or 171)
- SAAQ
  (with STM buses 164 or 171)
- Parc Ahuntsic
  - Gary Carter Stadium
- Parc-nature de l'Île de la Visitation
  (with STM buses 48, 49, or 69)
- Maison de la culture Ahuntsic/Cartierville
- Ahuntsic Bridge
