= Henri Bourassa (disambiguation) =

Henri Bourassa (1868–1952) was a French Canadian political leader and publisher.

Henri Bourassa may also refer to:

- Boulevard Henri-Bourassa, a street in Montreal, Canada named for the above
- Terminus Henri-Bourassa, a bus terminus in Montreal
- Henri-Bourassa station, a Montreal Metro station
- 171 Henri-Bourassa, a bus route in Montreal
- École Secondaire Henri-Bourassa, a secondary school in Montreal
