= Anjou station =

Railway station in Quebec, Canada

Anjou
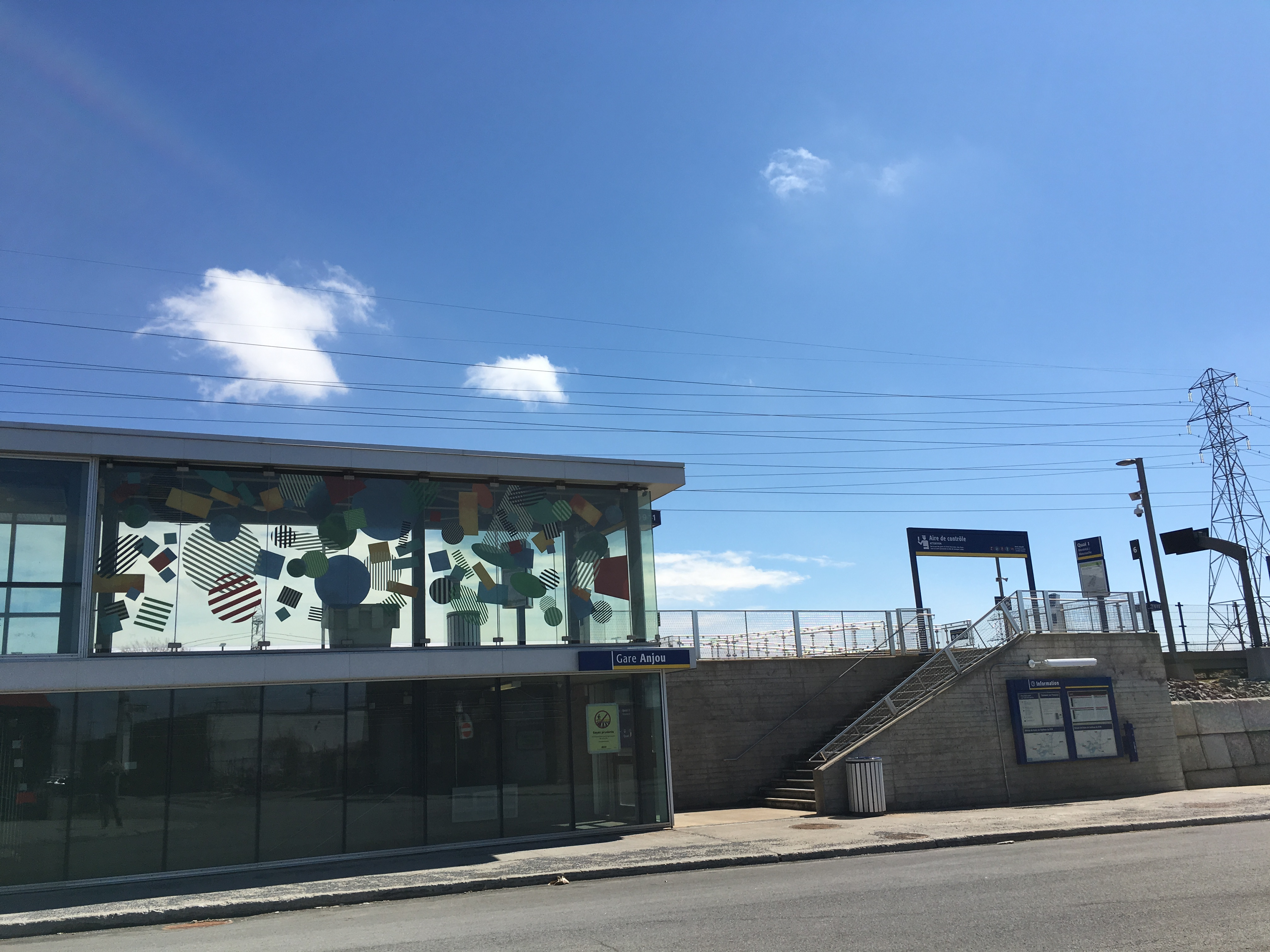

General information
- Location: 7260 8th Street; Anjou, Quebec H1E 2Z6
- Coordinates: 45°37′07″N 73°35′44″W
- Operator: Exo
- Platforms: 2 side platforms
- Tracks: 2
- Connections: STM bus; STM taxibus

Construction
- Parking: 308 Park-and-Ride, 2 Carpooling, and 7 Disabled spaces
- Cycle facilities: 15 spaces
- Accessible: Yes

Other information
- Fare zone: ARTM: A
- Website: Anjou (Exo)

History
- Opened: December 1, 2014; 11 years ago

Passengers
- 2019: 178,100 (Exo)

Services
Preceding station	Via Rail	Following station
Joliette toward Jonquière	Montreal–Jonquière	Sauvé toward Montreal
Joliette toward Senneterre	Montreal–Senneterre	Sauvé toward Montreal
Preceding station	Exo	Following station
Rivière-des-Prairies toward Mascouche	Line 15 – Mascouche	Saint-Léonard–Montréal-Nord toward Côte-de-Liesse
Location

Anjou station (French pronunciation: [ɑ̃ʒu]) is a commuter rail station operated by Exo in Montreal, Quebec, Canada.

It is served by the Mascouche line and by Via Rail's Montreal–Jonquière and Montreal–Senneterre trains.

The station is located immediately northeast of Quebec Autoroute 25 in an industrial area between Boulevard Henri-Bourassa Est and Boulevard Maurice-Duplessis. It is in fact located a short distance outside the boundaries of the borough of Anjou. The station, built on an embankment, possesses two low-level side platforms: platform 1 on the north side and platform 2, which is shorter, on the south side. Platform 1 is primarily used by the Mascouche commuter train and platform 2 by Via. Both platforms are wheelchair accessible and feature raised wheelchair platforms with ramps to provide access to the trains.

An artwork by Pierre Blanchette entitled Entrain consists of a set of brightly coloured graphics installed on the windows of the upper level of the north-side headhouse.

== Connecting bus routes ==
Société de transport de Montréal
No.	Route	Connects to	Service times / notes
40	Henri-Bourassa East	Pointe-aux-Trembles	Weekdays only
285	Gare Anjou – Rivière-des-Prairies		In service on weekdays during rush hours. From 5:45am to 9:15am From 4:15pm to 6:45pm
288	Gare Anjou – Parc industriel		In service from Monday to Friday during rush hours except on public holidays. From 5:45am to 9:15am From 4:15pm to 18:45pm
