= Rivière-des-Prairies station =

Railway station in Quebec, Canada

Rivière-des-Prairies
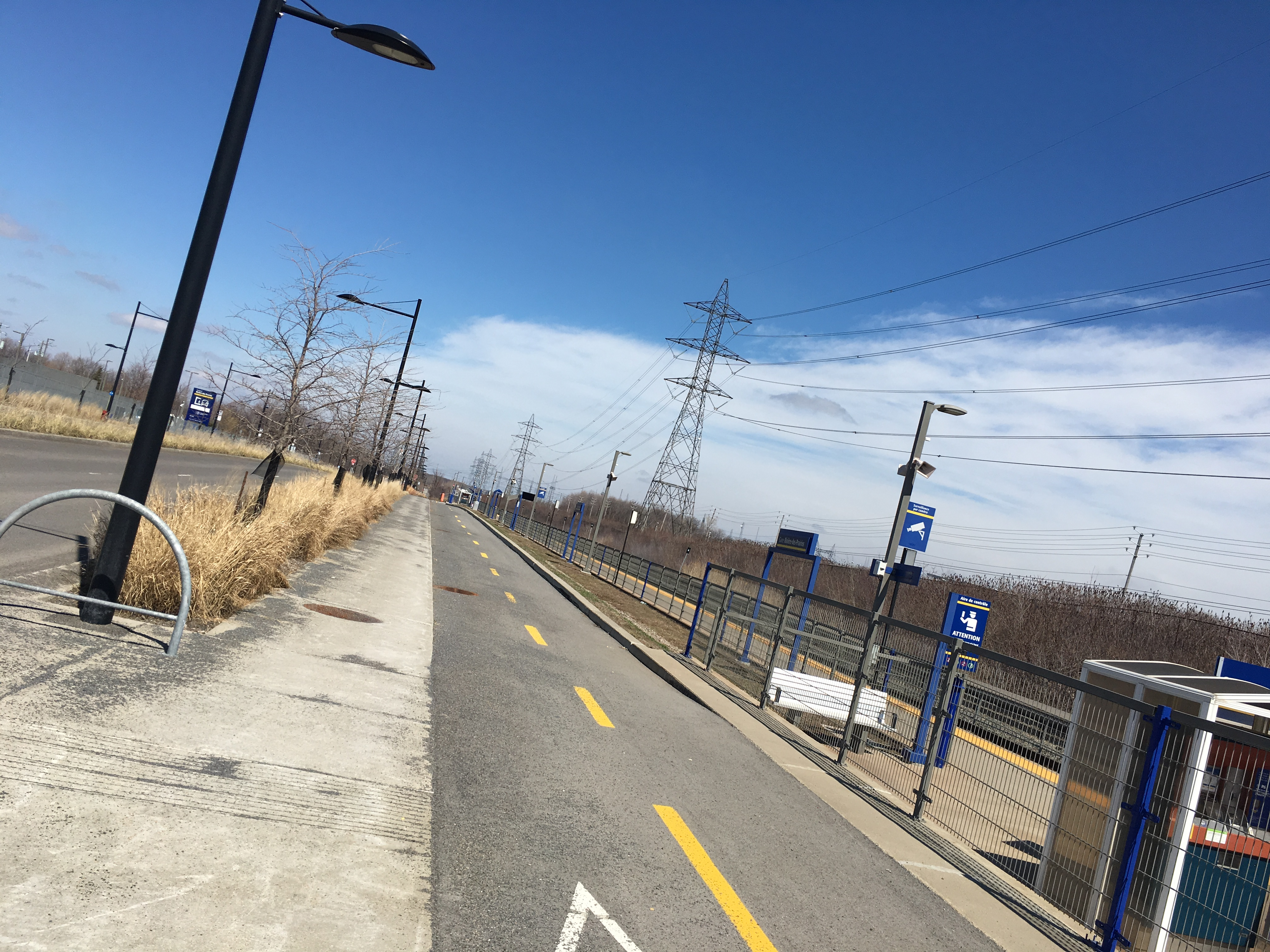

General information
- Location: 10801 Maurice-Duplessis Boulevard; Montreal, Quebec H1C 1S7
- Coordinates: 45°39′38″N 73°32′21″W
- Operator: Exo
- Platforms: 1 side platform
- Tracks: 2
- Connections: STM bus; STM taxibus

Construction
- Parking: 202 Park-and-Ride, 2 Carpooling, and 6 Disabled spaces
- Cycle facilities: 29 spaces
- Accessible: Yes

Other information
- Fare zone: ARTM: A
- Website: Rivière-des-Prairies (exo)

History
- Opened: December 1, 2014; 11 years ago

Passengers
- 2019: 180,200 (Exo)

Services
Preceding station	Exo	Following station
Pointe-aux-Trembles toward Mascouche	Line 15 – Mascouche	Anjou toward Côte-de-Liesse
Former services at Pointe aux Trembles (CN)
Preceding station	Canadian National Railway	Following station
Riviere des Prairies (CN) toward Montreal	Montreal – Rawdon; Local stops	Charlemagne toward Rawdon
Location

Rivière-des-Prairies station (French pronunciation: [ʁivjɛʁ de pʁɛʁi]) is a commuter rail station operated by Exo in the borough of Rivière-des-Prairies–Pointe-aux-Trembles, in Montreal, Quebec, Canada. It is served by the Mascouche line.

The station is located parallel to Boulevard Maurice-Duplessis at the corner of Rue Saint-Jean-Baptiste in Rivière-des-Prairies. Two tracks run through the station, but only one is served by the station's single low-level side platform on the north side of the tracks. There is no station building, with the platform exiting directly onto the sidewalk. The station is wheelchair accessible. The station's parking lot and bus terminus are located across Boulevard Maurice-Duplessis from the station.

A sculpture by Gilles Mihalcean entitled J'arrive is located in the parking lot.

== Connecting bus routes ==
All buses except for the 81 start/end their routes at the bus terminus located across Maurice-Duplessis boulevard. The parking lot is nearby.

Société de transport de Montréal
No.	Route	Connects to	Service times / notes
48	Perras	Pie-IX BRT; Henri-Bourassa	Daily Offers 48X variant with shorter route
49	Maurice Duplessis	Pie-IX BRT; Henri-Bourassa	Daily
81	Saint-Jean-Baptiste		Daily
289	Pointe-aux-Prairies		In service from Monday to Friday, except on public holidays. Monday to Friday From 5:45am to 6:45pm
428	Express Parcs Industriels de l'Est	Radisson	Weekdays, peak only
449	Express Rivière-des-Prairies	Radisson	Weekdays only
