= Ahuntsic Park =

Urban park in Montreal, Canada

- Parc Ahuntsic
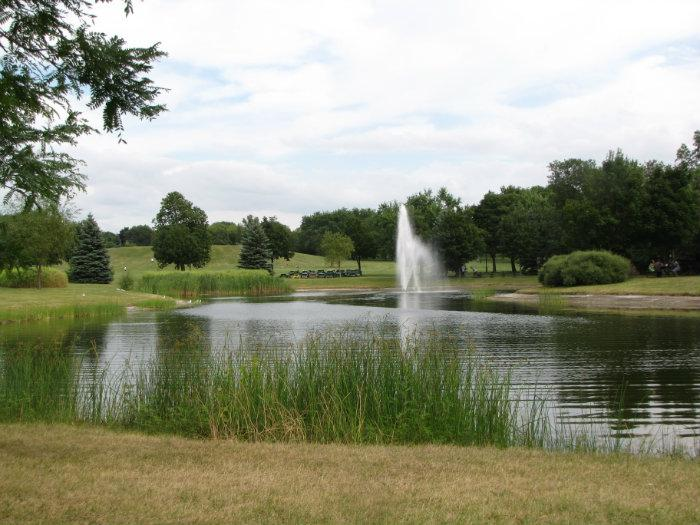
- The pond at Ahuntsic Park.

- Location within Montreal
- Type: Urban park
- Location: Ahuntsic-Cartierville, Montreal, Quebec, Canada
- Coordinates: 45°33′21″N 73°39′51″W
- Area: 10.5 hectares (26 acres)
- Operator: City of Montreal
- Open: 6:00 a.m. to 11:00 p.m.
- Status: Open all year
- Public transit: at Henri-Bourassa at Terminus Henri-Bourassa
- Website: Parc Ahuntsic

Ahuntsic Park (French: Parc Ahuntsic) is an urban park in the Ahuntsic-Cartierville borough of Montreal, Quebec, Canada. It is bordered by Henri Bourassa Boulevard to the north, Saint Hubert Street to the east, Lajeunesse Street to the west and Fleury Street to the south. It is located next to Terminus Henri-Bourassa.

The park is 105,000 m^{2} (1,130,000 sq ft) large. There are paths for pedestrians and cyclists, a playground, a bowling green, a community garden, a skate park and an indoor skating rink. One of the features of the park is its hill, and pond. There is also a welcome centre near the park's entrance.

== Gary Carter Stadium ==
The park is also home to a baseball field which serves as the home field of the Orioles de Montréal of the Ligue de Baseball Junior Élite du Québec.

On October 10, 2012, Montreal mayor Gérald Tremblay and former Montreal Expos colour commentator Rodger Brulotte announced that the baseball field at Ahuntsic Park would be named "Gary Carter Stadium" after the late Expo Hall of Famer Gary Carter.

On May 11, 2013, the Trois-Rivières Aigles and Québec Capitales of the Canadian American Association of Professional Baseball, played an exhibition game at Gary Carter Stadium. This marked the first professional baseball game played in Montreal since the last Expos home game on September 29, 2004.
