= Pointe-aux-Trembles station =

Railway station in Quebec, Canada

Pointe-aux-Trembles
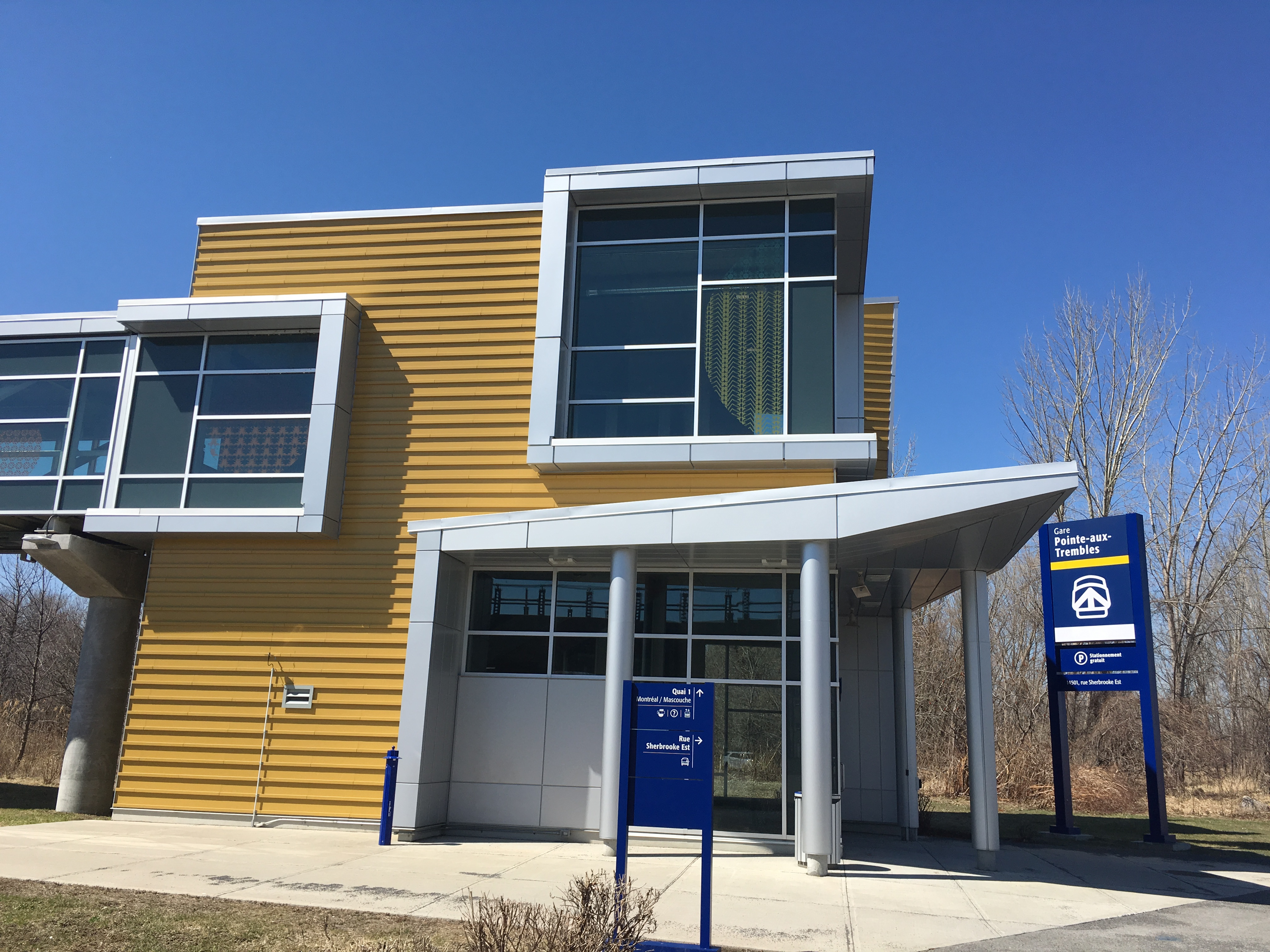

General information
- Location: 14501 Sherbrooke Street East; Montreal, Quebec H1A 5S2
- Coordinates: 45°40′29″N 73°30′22″W
- Operator: Exo
- Platforms: 2 side platforms (1 in active use, 1 emergency platform)
- Tracks: 2
- Connections: STM bus

Construction
- Parking: 316 Park-and-Ride, 4 Carpooling, and 9 Disabled Spaces
- Cycle facilities: 28 spaces
- Accessible: Yes

Other information
- Fare zone: ARTM: A
- Website: Pointe-aux-Trembles (RTM)

History
- Opened: July 6, 2015

Passengers
- 2019: 119,600 (Exo)

Services
Preceding station	Exo	Following station
Repentigny toward Mascouche	Line 15 – Mascouche	Rivière-des-Prairies toward Côte-de-Liesse
Location

Pointe-aux-Trembles station (French pronunciation: [pwɛ̃t o tʁɑ̃bl]) is a commuter rail station operated by Exo in the borough of Rivière-des-Prairies–Pointe-aux-Trembles, in Montreal, Quebec, Canada.

It is served by the Mascouche line.

The station is located adjacent to Rue Sherbrooke Est in Pointe-aux-Trembles. Two tracks run through the station, but only one is in active passenger service, served by a single low-level side platform on the north side of the tracks. The station has a single exit located on Rue Sherbrooke, with stair and elevator access to an enclosed walkway leading to the platform. As a result, the station is wheelchair-accessible. A shorter platform, unused during normal operations, is located on the south side of the tracks, serving in case of emergency.

The station's parking lot and bus loop are located on the south side of the tracks, requiring an approximately 400-metre detour to reach the platform.

An artwork by Doyon-Rivest entitled Le Quotidien Fantastique consists of a series of brightly coloured motifs on the windows of the enclosed walkway between the station headhouse and the platform.

== Connecting bus routes ==
Société de transport de Montréal
No.	Route	Connects to	Service times / notes
40	Henri-Bourassa East	Anjou	Weekdays only
86	Pointe-aux-Trembles	Sherbrooke East Park and Ride	Daily
186	Sherbrooke East	Sherbrooke East Park and Ride; Honoré-Beaugrand	Daily
430	Express Pointe-aux-Trembles	Sherbrooke East Park and Ride; Bonaventure; Gare Centrale; Terminus Centre-ville; Lucien-L'Allier	Weekdays only
486	Express Sherbrooke	Sherbrooke East Park and Ride; Honoré-Beaugrand	Weekdays, peak only
