= Bois-de-Boulogne =

Bois-de-Boulogne may refer to:

- Bois de Boulogne
- Bois-de-Boulogne (AMT)
- Bois-de-Boulogne: city in mountain region of Lebanon (Arabic: Ghābat Būlūnyā), 33 km from Beirut
