= Du Ruisseau station =

REM station in Montreal, Quebec, Canada

Du Ruisseau
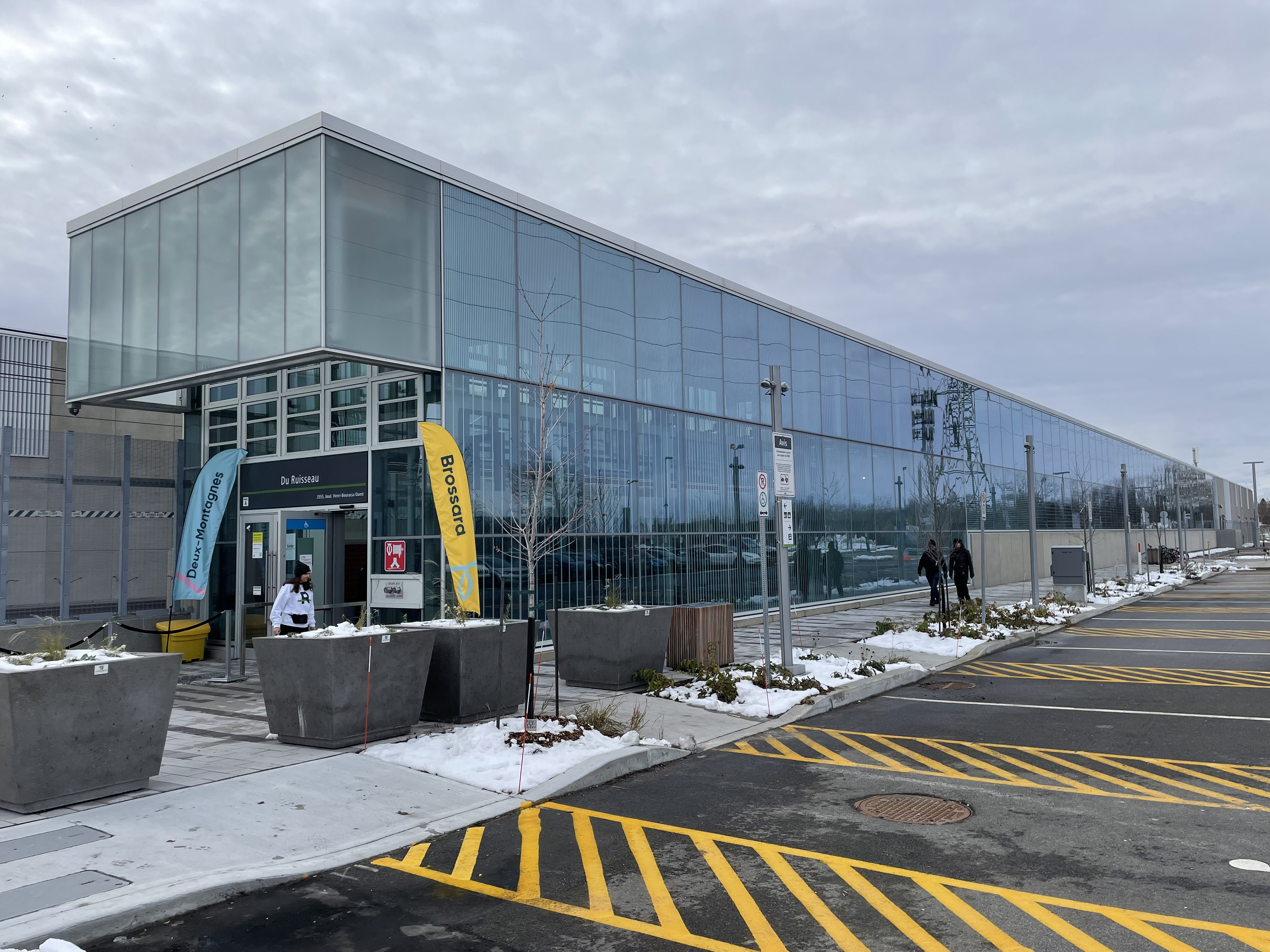
- Station entrance seen from the park-and-ride lot

General information
- Location: 3555 Henri-Bourassa Blvd. West; Montreal, Quebec
- Coordinates: 45°31′44″N 73°41′28″W
- Operator: Pulsar (AtkinsRéalis and Alstom)
- Platforms: 2 side platforms
- Tracks: 2
- Connections: STM bus; Société de transport de Laval

Construction
- Structure type: At-grade
- Parking: 1,054 spaces
- Cycle facilities: 46 spaces
- Accessible: Yes

Other information
- Station code: RUI
- Fare zone: A
- Website: Du Ruisseau station (REM)

History
- Opened: 1994
- Closed: May 11, 2020
- Rebuilt: 17 November 2025 (REM)
- Electrified: 1,500 V DC catenary

Passengers
- 2019: 537,900 (Exo)

Services
Preceding station	REM	Following station
Bois-Franc toward Deux-Montagnes or Anse-à-l'Orme	Réseau express métropolitain	Montpellier toward Brossard
Future services
Preceding station	REM	Following station
Bois-Franc toward Airport	Réseau express métropolitain (opens 2027)	Montpellier toward Brossard
Former services
Preceding station	Exo	Following station
Bois-Franc toward Deux-Montagnes	Deux-Montagnes	Montpellier toward Montreal
Location

Du Ruisseau (Canadian French: [d͡zy ʁɥiso]; French: [dy ʁɥiso]) is a Réseau express métropolitain (REM) station in Montreal, Quebec, Canada that opened for REM service on 17 November 2025. It replaced a commuter rail station by the same name, operated by Exo on the Deux-Montagnes line until May 2020.

== Origin of name ==
Du Ruisseau takes its name from nearby Boulevard Du Ruisseau, named for a stream (ruisseau) that formerly flowed through the area.

Prior to the modernization of the Deux-Montagnes Line, between 1993 and 1995, this area was served by the now defunct Monkland station, located some 700 metres (2,300 ft) further west at the O'Brien Avenue level crossing.

== Location ==
The station is located at 3555 Henri-Bourassa Boulevard West, between Jules-Poitras Boulevard and Dutrisac Street, just west of Autoroute 15 exit # 3 in Saint-Laurent on the border with Cartierville. It is located about one kilometre from the Bois-de-Boulogne station on the Saint-Jérôme line.

== Facilities ==
The station is built at grade, and features two enclosed side platforms along the tracks, with platform screen doors. Each platform features an entrance ticket hall located below platform level, at the west end on the south (inbound) platform and at the east end on the north (outbound) platform. The centre of the platforms are connected by a cross-under.

The station is equipped with elevators between the entrances and the platforms, and between the platforms and the cross-under.

The south entrance opens onto a plaza on the north side of Henri-Bourassa Boulevard, while the north entrance leads to an extensive park-and-ride lot between the boulevard and the expressway.

To improve circulation between the nearby neighbourhoods that are separated by the multiple transportation corridors, the station project included the construction of a pedestrian and cyclist underpass underneath the tracks just west of the station.

== Connecting bus routes ==
Société de transport de Montréal
No.	Route	Connects to	Service times / notes
69	Henri-Bourassa	Pie-IX BRT; Henri-Bourassa; Bois-de-Boulogne; Bois-Franc	Daily
117	O'Brien	Du Collège	Daily
527	REM Côte-de-Liesse / Montpellier / Du Ruisseau / Bois-Franc	Côte-de-Liesse; Montpellier; Bois-Franc	Used in case of a service disruption on the REM
TA ♿︎	STM Transport adapté		
Société de transport de Laval
No.	Route	Connects to	Service times / notes
55	Métro Henri-Bourassa - Laval-Ouest	Bois-de-Boulogne; Henri-Bourassa	Weekdays only
TA ♿︎	STL Transport adapté		
