= Montpellier station (REM) =

REM station in Montreal, Quebec, Canada

Montpellier
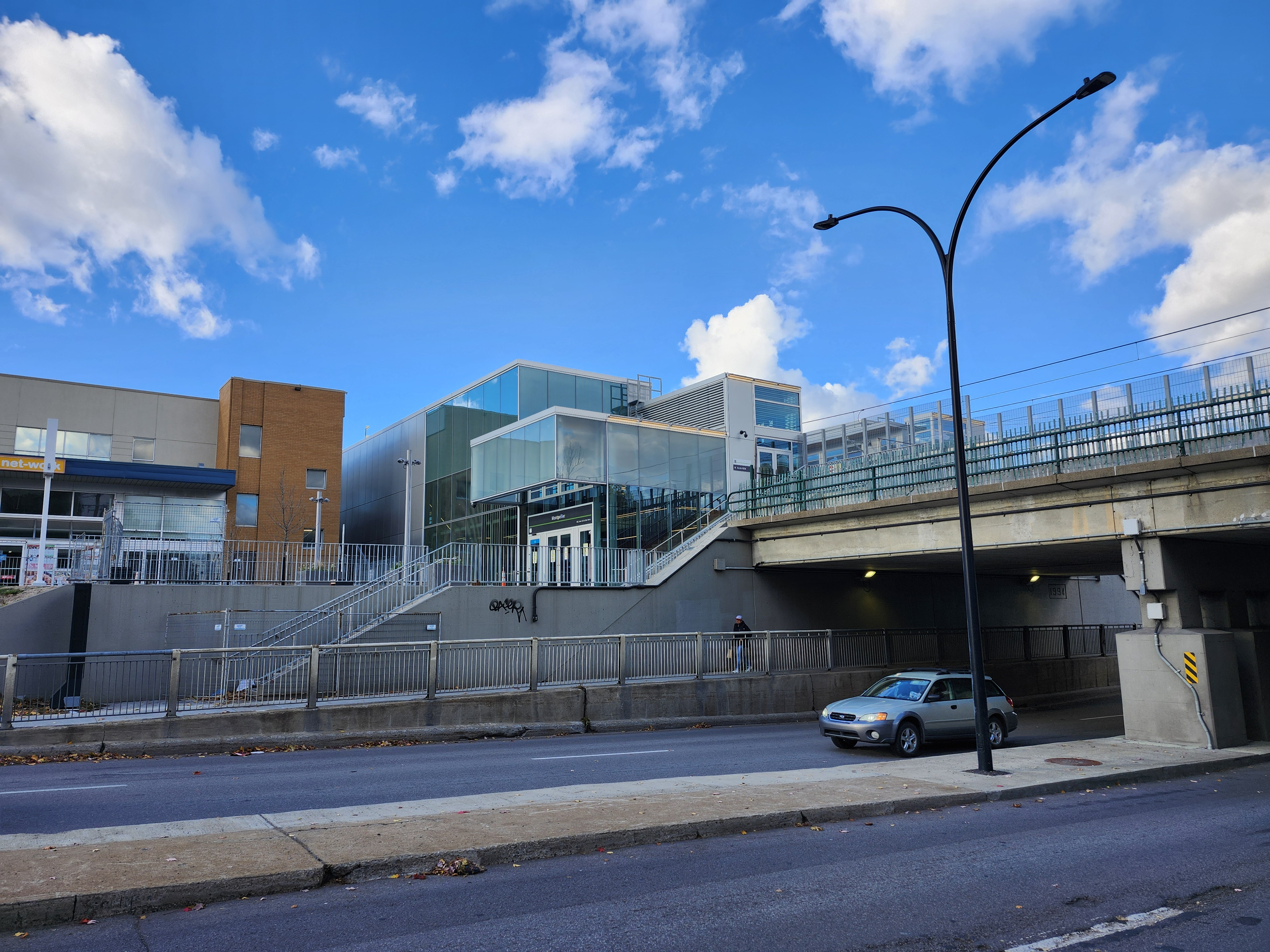
- Montpellier station entrance on Boulevard de la Côte-Vertu

General information
- Location: 465 Côte-Vertu Boulevard; Montreal, Quebec; Canada
- Coordinates: 45°31′29″N 73°40′19″W
- Operator: Pulsar (AtkinsRéalis and Alstom)
- Platforms: 2 side platforms
- Tracks: 2
- Connections: STM bus; STM taxibus

Construction
- Structure type: Embankment
- Cycle facilities: 60 rack spaces
- Accessible: Yes

Other information
- Station code: MPL
- Fare zone: A
- Website: rem.info/en/travelling/stations/montpellier

History
- Opened: 1918
- Closed: May 11, 2020
- Rebuilt: 17 November 2025 (REM)
- Former names: Vertu

Passengers
- 2019: 590,400 (Exo)

Services
Preceding station	REM	Following station
Du Ruisseau toward Deux-Montagnes or Anse-à-l'Orme	Réseau express métropolitain	Côte-de-Liesse toward Brossard
Future services
Preceding station	REM	Following station
Du Ruisseau toward Airport	Réseau express métropolitain (opens 2027)	Côte-de-Liesse toward Brossard
Former services
Preceding station	Exo	Following station
Du Ruisseau toward Deux-Montagnes	Deux-Montagnes	Mont-Royal toward Montreal
Location

Montpellier (French pronunciation: [mɔ̃pəlje]) is a Réseau express métropolitain (REM) station that opened on 17 November 2025. It is located in Montreal, Quebec, Canada. It replaced a commuter rail station by the same name, operated by Exo on the Deux-Montagnes line until May 2020.

== Name origin ==
Prior to the modernization of the Deux-Montagnes line in 1993-1995, the train station was called Vertu because of its location on Côte-Vertu Boulevard. One of the reasons the name was changed was to avoid confusion with the Côte-Vertu metro station, which opened in 1986. It was renamed after a nearby street, Boulevard/Rue Montpellier (the designation changes at Côte-Vertu Boulevard), which takes its name from the Montpellier dit Beaulieu family, who settled in Saint-Laurent in the 18th century and operated a farm at this location.

== Facilities ==
The station is located at 465 Côte-Vertu Boulevard in Saint-Laurent between the intersections with Jules Poitras Boulevard and Muir St. It is built at grade, just north of a viaduct that carries the REM rails over Côte-Vertu Boulevard. The station features two enclosed side platforms along the tracks, with platform screen doors.

The entrances and ticket halls are located at the south end of the platforms, on either side of the tracks, below platform level. Below the ticket hall level, a cross-under connects the two ticket halls and thereby the two platforms within the fare-paid zone.

Each ticket hall opens onto a plaza on the north side of Côte-Vertu Boulevard. Just south of the station, portions of the existing train station platforms were retained for use as walkways over Côte-Vertu Boulevard, to permit access from the south side.

== Connecting bus routes ==
Société de transport de Montréal
No.	Route	Connects to	Service times / notes
121	Sauvé / Côte-Vertu	Côte-Vertu; Ahuntsic; Sauvé	Daily
128	Saint-Laurent	Côte-Vertu; Du Collège; Côte-de-Liesse	Daily
171	Henri-Bourassa	Côte-Vertu; Bois-de-Boulogne; Henri-Bourassa	Daily
174	Côte-Vertu	Côte-Vertu	Weekdays only
177	Thimens	Côte-Vertu	Daily
282	Côte-Vertu Ouest	Côte-Vertu	Weekends only
378 ☾	Sauvé / YUL Aéroport	Sauvé; Côte-Vertu; Du Collège; Dorval	Night service Connects to Montréal–Trudeau International Airport
380 ☾	Henri-Bourassa	Henri-Bourassa; Bois-de-Boulogne; Côte-Vertu; Du Collège	Night service
527	REM Côte-de-Liesse / Montpelier / Du Ruisseau / Bois-Franc	Côte-de-Liesse; Du Ruisseau; Bois-Franc	Used in case of a service disruption on the REM
TA ♿︎	STM Transport adapté		
