= Du Collège station =

Montreal Metro station

Du Collège
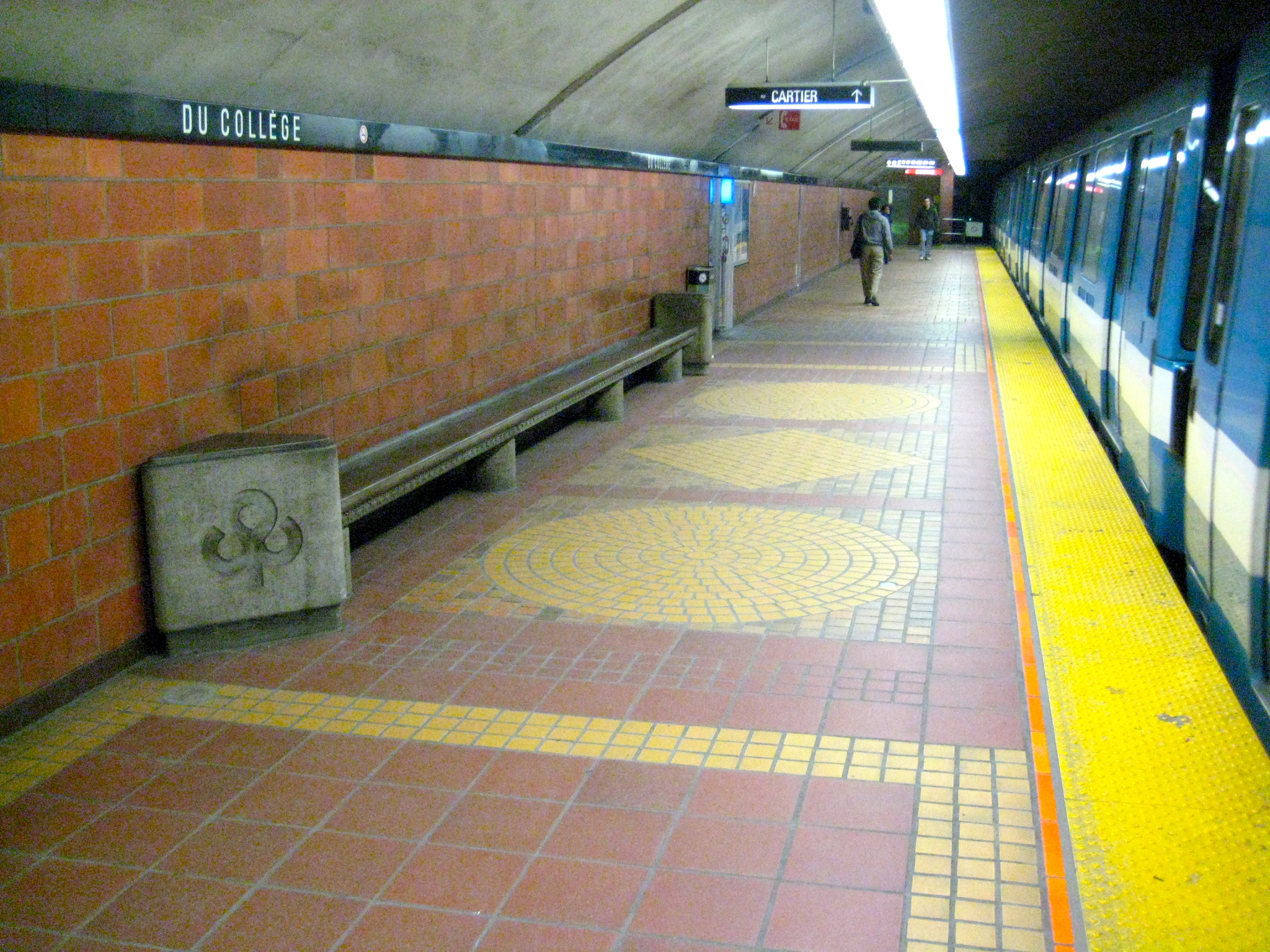

General information
- Location: 1490, rue Du Collège & 450, rue Ouimet; Saint-Laurent, Quebec H4L 2L7; Canada
- Coordinates: 45°30′32″N 73°40′27″W
- Operator: Société de transport de Montréal
- Platforms: 2 side platforms
- Tracks: 2
- Connections: STM bus

Construction
- Depth: 17.1 metres (56 feet 1 inch), 26th deepest
- Accessible: Yes
- Architect: Gilles S. Bonnetto and Jacques Garand

Other information
- Fare zone: ARTM: A

History
- Opened: 9 January 1984
- Rebuilt: 2015-18 (north exit)

Passengers
- 2024: 2,795,064 ▲10.33%
- Rank: 34 of 68

Services
Preceding station	Montreal Metro	Following station
Côte-Vertu Terminus	Orange Line	De La Savane toward Montmorency
Location

Du Collège station (French pronunciation: [dy kɔlɛʒ]) is a Montreal Metro station in the borough of Saint-Laurent in Montreal, Quebec, Canada. It is operated by the Société de transport de Montréal (STM) and serves the Orange Line. It opened on January 9, 1984, and replaced Plamondon station as the western terminus of the line until Côte-Vertu station opened in 1986.

== Overview ==
Concourse of the station

The station is a normal side platform station with an entrance at either end. The southern entrance is located in a bus loop.

The station was designed by Gilles S. Bonnetto and Jacques Garand, and contains several artworks. The northern entrance contains four stained-glass windows, one by Lyse Charland Favretti on the theme of education and three by Pierre Osterrath on the borough of Saint-Laurent, its agricultural past, and its future. The southern entrance contains another stained-glass window by Favretti representing the borough's aeronautics industry, as well as an abstract relief in brick by Aurelio Sandonato. The station's best-known architectural feature, however, is an Ionic column in the northern mezzanine.

In 2004, the station was briefly mentioned in the 8th track, "La Reine", of the band Les Cowboys Fringants' album La Grand-Messe.

In May 2018, elevators were inaugurated at the station, making it fully accessible.

Côte-Vertu metro station was closed for 12 weeks from May 29 to August 22, 2021, and Du Collège temporarily served as northwestern terminus of the Orange line.

== Origin of the name ==
This station is named for the rue du Collège, whose name commemorates the nearby Cégep de Saint-Laurent, inaugurated as a college in 1847 and turned into a Cégep in 1968.

== Connecting bus routes ==
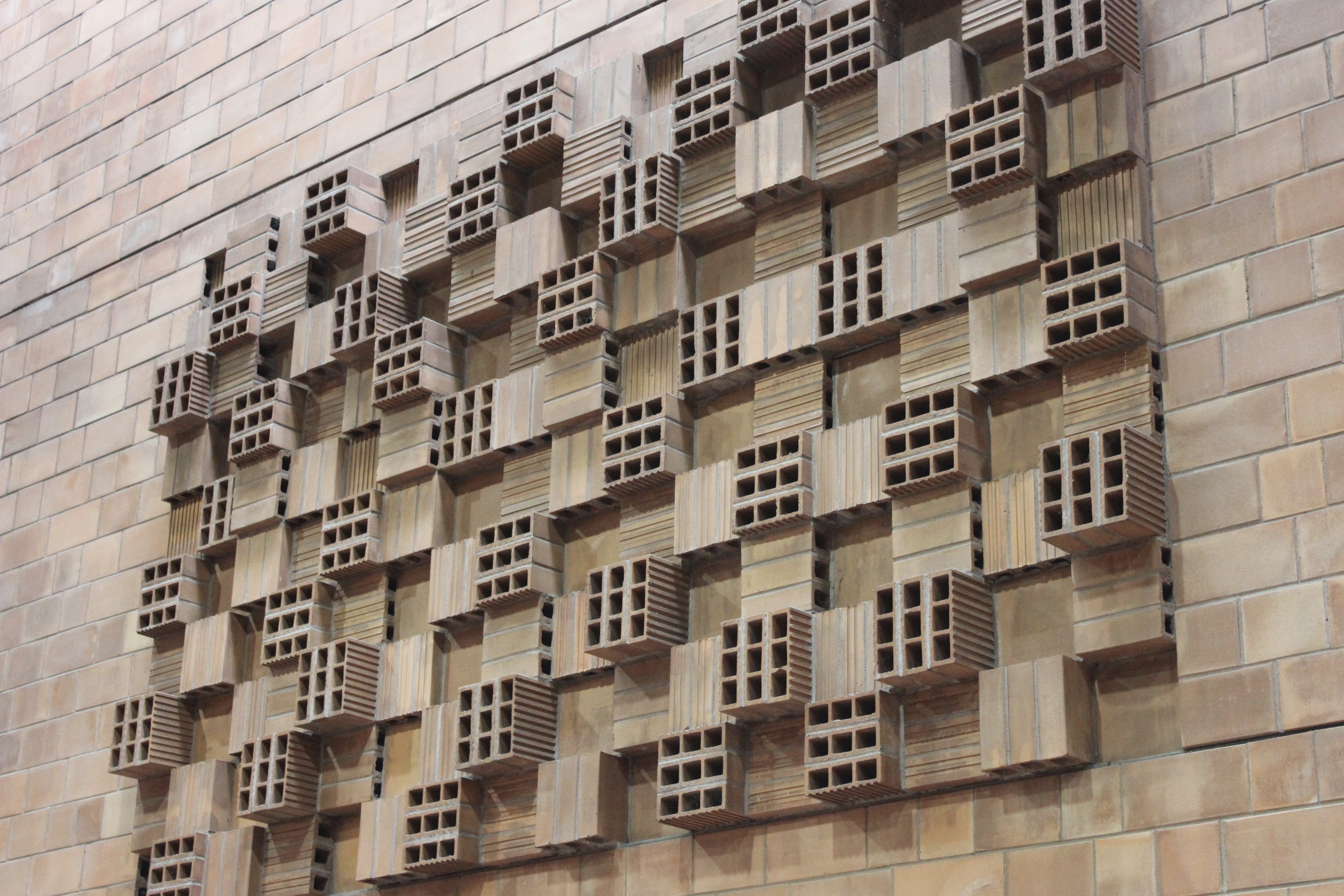
An installation by artist Aurelio Sandonato located in the metro

Société de transport de Montréal
No.	Route	Connects to	Service times / notes
17	Décarie	Place-Saint-Henri; Vendôme; Snowdon; Namur; De La Savane; Côte-Vertu	Daily
73	Dalton		Weekdays, peak only Looping route
100	Crémazie	Crémazie; De La Savane (eastbound only)	Daily Westbound only
117	O'Brien	Du Ruisseau	Daily
127	Alexis-Nihon	Bois-Franc	Daily
128	Saint-Laurent	Montpellier; Côte-Vertu; Côte-de-Liesse	Daily
175	Griffith		Weekdays only
202	Dawson	Côte-de-Liesse; Dorval; Cedar Park; Fairview-Pointe-Claire	Daily
220	Kieran		Weekdays only
371 ☾	Décarie	Côte-Vertu; De La Savane; Namur; Snowdon; Place-Saint-Henri; Lionel-Groulx; Atwater	Night service
378 ☾	Sauvé / YUL Aéroport	Sauvé; Montpellier; Côte-Vertu; Dorval	Night service Connects to Montréal–Trudeau International Airport
380 ☾	Henri-Bourassa	Henri-Bourassa; Bois-de-Boulogne; Montpellier; Côte-Vertu	Night service
382 ☾	Pierrefonds / Saint-Charles	Namur; De La Savane; Côte-Vertu; Bois-Franc; Sunnybrooke; Pierrefonds-Roxboro; Beaconsfield	Night service
460	Express Métropolitaine	Crémazie; De La Savane (eastbound); Dorval	Weekdays only, westbound only Certain trips start or end at Montréal-Trudeau International Airport
522	Bois-Franc / Du Collège Shuttle	Bois-Franc	Used in case of a service disruption on the REM
526	Côte-de-Liesse / Du Collège Shuttle	Côte-de-Liesse	Used in case of a service disruption on the REM
TA ♿︎	STM Transport adapté		

== Nearby points of interest ==
- Vanier College
- Cégep de Saint-Laurent
- Promenade de Vieux Saint-Laurent
- Saint-Laurent Museum of Art
- former Saint-Laurent Postal Station
- former Saint-Laurent Police Station
- Saint-Laurent Public Library
- Saint-Laurent Municipal Courthouse
- Montreal Fire Station 73
- Saint-Laurent City Hall
- Décarie Hot Dogs
