= Bois-Franc station =

Interchange REM station in Montreal, Quebec, Canada

Bois-Franc
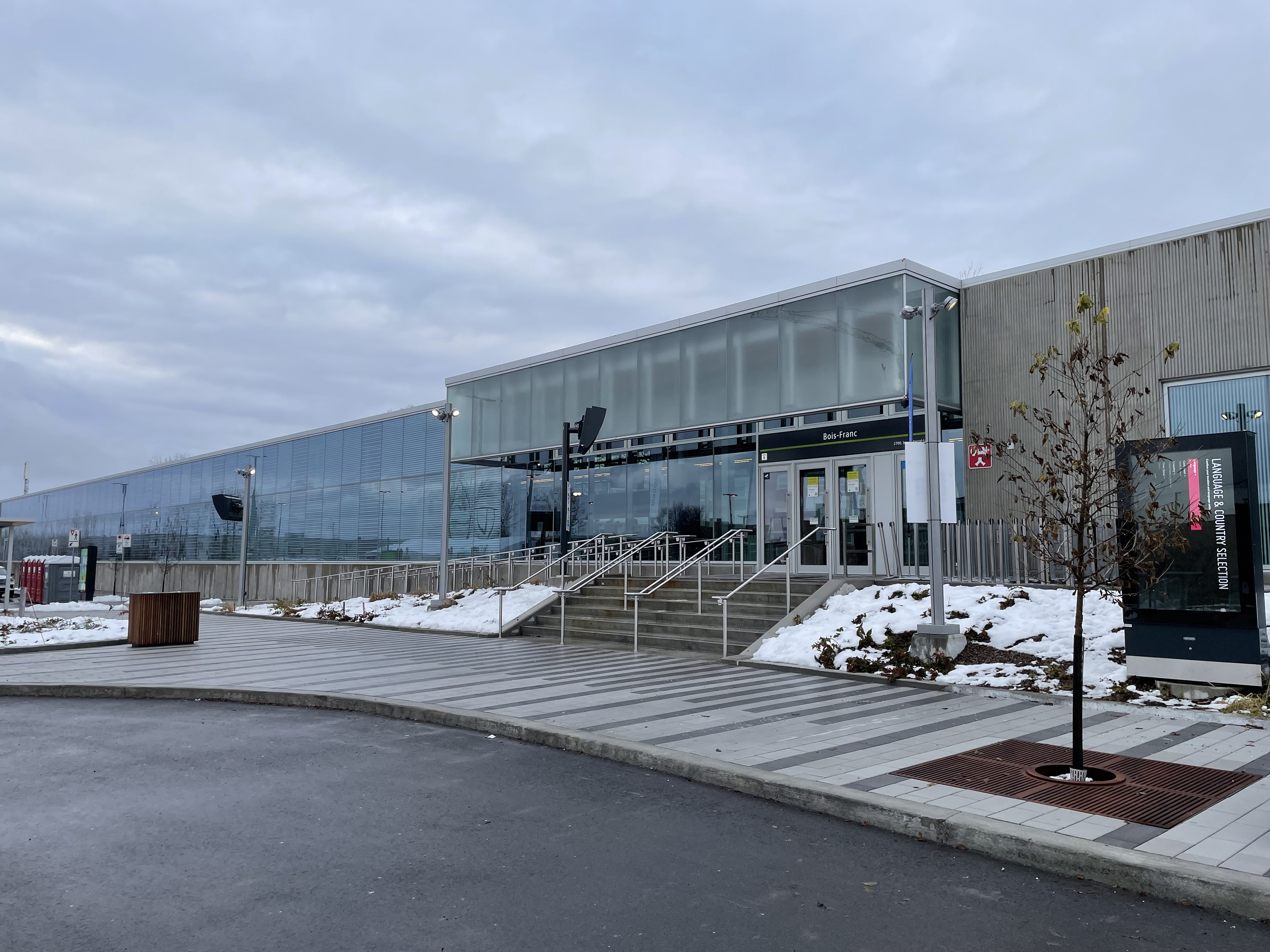
- Bois-Franc station as seen from the bus loop

General information
- Location: 2700 Marcel-Laurin Boulevard; Montreal, Quebec; Canada
- Coordinates: 45°31′20″N 73°42′43″W
- Operator: Pulsar (AtkinsRéalis and Alstom); Canadian Northern Railway (1918–1923); Canadian National Railway (1923–1996); Agence métropolitaine de transport (1996–2017); Réseau de transport métropolitain (2017–2020)
- Platforms: 2 side platforms
- Tracks: 2
- Bus stands: 8
- Connections: STM bus; Société de transport de Laval

Construction
- Structure type: At-grade
- Parking: 689 spaces
- Cycle facilities: 120 rack spaces
- Accessible: Yes

Other information
- Station code: BFC
- Fare zone: ARTM: A
- Website: rem.info/en/travelling/stations/bois-franc

History
- Opened: 1918
- Closed: December 31, 2020
- Rebuilt: November 17, 2025 (REM)
- Former names: Lazard (1918–1926); Val-Royal (1926–1995)

Passengers
- 2019: 737,900 (Exo)

Services
Preceding station	REM	Following station
Sunnybrooke toward Deux-Montagnes	Réseau express métropolitain	Du Ruisseau toward Brossard
Des Sources toward Anse-à-l'Orme	Réseau express métropolitain	Du Ruisseau toward Brossard
Future services
Preceding station	REM	Following station
Marie-Curie toward Airport	Réseau express métropolitain (opens 2027)	Du Ruisseau toward Brossard
Former services
Preceding station	Exo	Following station
Sunnybrooke toward Deux-Montagnes	Deux-Montagnes	Du Ruisseau toward Montreal
Preceding station	Canadian National Railway	Following station
Services in 1943
Ste. Genevieve toward Lac Remi	Montreal – Lac Remi	Mount Royal toward Montreal
Ste. Genevieve toward St. Eustache-sur-le-Lac or Hawkesbury	St. Eustache-sur-le-Lac services	Vertu toward Montreal
Track layout
Location

Bois-Franc (French pronunciation: [bwafʁɑ̃]) is a Réseau express métropolitain (REM) interchange station in the Bois-Franc neighbourhood of Montreal, Quebec, Canada. REM service began at the station on 17 November 2025.

It replaced a commuter rail station of the same name on the Deux-Montagnes line, which was closed when Exo service ended in 2020 in preparation for the construction of the REM. After the stations inbound of here were closed on May 11, 2020 so construction works could begin on the Mount Royal Tunnel, Bois-Franc served as the inbound terminus of a remnant of the line out to Deux-Montagnes, until finally being closed on December 31, 2020.

== Location ==
The station is located at 5465 Henri Bourassa Boulevard West, between Marcel-Laurin Boulevard/Boulevard Laurentien (Route 117) and Grenet Street in Saint-Laurent on the border with Cartierville.

== History ==
The original station was named Lazard (likely for the Franco-American merchant bank Lazard Frères & Co. which underwrote the construction of the Mount Royal Tunnel on this rail line). In 1926, the station was renamed Val-Royal. After the modernization of the Deux-Montagnes Line, between 1993 and 1995, a new station named Bois-Franc was built; the original station was then demolished at the request of the Canadian National Railway and with the permission of Transport Canada on June 5, 1995. The old station site is now a parking lot on the east side of Boulevard Marcel-Laurin.

=== Name origin ===
The name Bois-Franc (lit. 'hardwood') dates back to 1717, when the Sulpician order, seigneurs of the Island of Montreal, created a concession or côte in this area, which became known as Côte Saint-Louis or Côte du Bois-Franc.The name "Bois-Franc" referred to an extensive maple forest in the area, remnants of which make up the Bois-de-Liesse and Bois-de-Saraguay nature parks. In keeping with the practice in other côtes, the road serving the area took the name of the côte, Chemin du Bois-Franc.

In 1911, an airport opened in the area, known as Bois-Franc Field, later Cartierville Airport. It was decommissioned in 1988 and a residential development, also called Bois-Franc, was built in its place, opening in 1993, shortly before the commuter train station was rebuilt.

=== Cartierville branch and station ===
A single-track electrified (2400 V DC) branch to Cartierville, a relic of when the line terminated there in Canadian Northern Railway days, left the line at (then) Val-Royal station. When the line was run by Canadian National, only one rush-hour trip was scheduled in each direction. It was abandoned in the early 1980s when STM predecessor STCUM took over operations of the Deux-Montagnes line. The Cartierville station was located at the corner of Gouin West and Laurentian boulevards. The Cartierville Station was to have been the terminus of Line 3 (Red) of the Montreal Metro.

== Proposed Metro extension ==
Proposals to extend the Orange Line of the Metro to Bois-Franc have been considered since the late 1970s. Following the construction of a Metro garage beyond Côte-Vertu station in the 2010s, only 1.2 kilometres (0.75 mi) of tunnelling is required to extend the line to interchange with the REM. As of 2022, studies are underway on the potential of an extension to Bois-Franc.

== Connecting bus routes ==
Société de transport de Montréal
No.	Route	Connects to	Service times / notes
64	Grenet	Côte-Vertu	Daily
69	Henri-Bourassa	Pie-IX BRT; Henri-Bourassa; Bois-de-Boulogne; Du Ruisseau	Daily
127	Alexis-Nihon	Du Collège	Daily
164	Dudemaine	Bois-de-Boulogne; Henri-Bourassa	Daily
170	Keller	Côte-Vertu	Daily
215	Henri-Bourassa / Brunswick	Côte-Vertu; Fairview-Pointe-Claire	Daily
522	REM Bois-Franc / Du Collège	Du Collège	Used in case of a service disruption on the REM
524	REM Anse-à-l'Orme / Kirkland / Fairview-Pointe-Claire / Des Sources / Bois-Franc	Anse-à-l'Orme; Kirkland; Fairview-Pointe-Claire; Des Sources	Used in case of a service disruption on the REM
527	REM Côte-de-Liesse / Montpellier / Du Ruisseau / Bois-Franc	Côte-de-Liesse; Montpellier; Du Ruisseau	Used in case of a service disruption on the REM
TA ♿︎	STM Transport adapté		
Société de transport de Laval
No.	Route	Connects to	Service times / notes
144	Métro Côte-Vertu - Sainte-Dorothée	Côte-Vertu	Daily
151	Métro Côte-Vertu - Sainte-Rose	Côte-Vertu	Daily
244	Station Bois-Franc - Sainte-Dorothée		Weekdays, peak only
251	Station Bois-Franc - Sainte-Rose		Weekdays, peak only
255	Station Bois-Franc - Laval-Ouest		Daily, weekdays early mornings and late evenings only
713	Métro Côte-Vertu - Sainte-Dorothée	Côte-Vertu; Sainte-Dorothée; Île-Bigras	Weekdays only
715	REM Deux-Montagnes / Bois-Franc	Deux-Montagnes	Used in case of a service disruption on the REM
TA ♿︎	STL Transport adapté		

== See also ==
- Montreal Metro future projects
- Orange Line west branch extension
