= Chabanel station =

Railway station in Montreal, Quebec, Canada

Chabanel
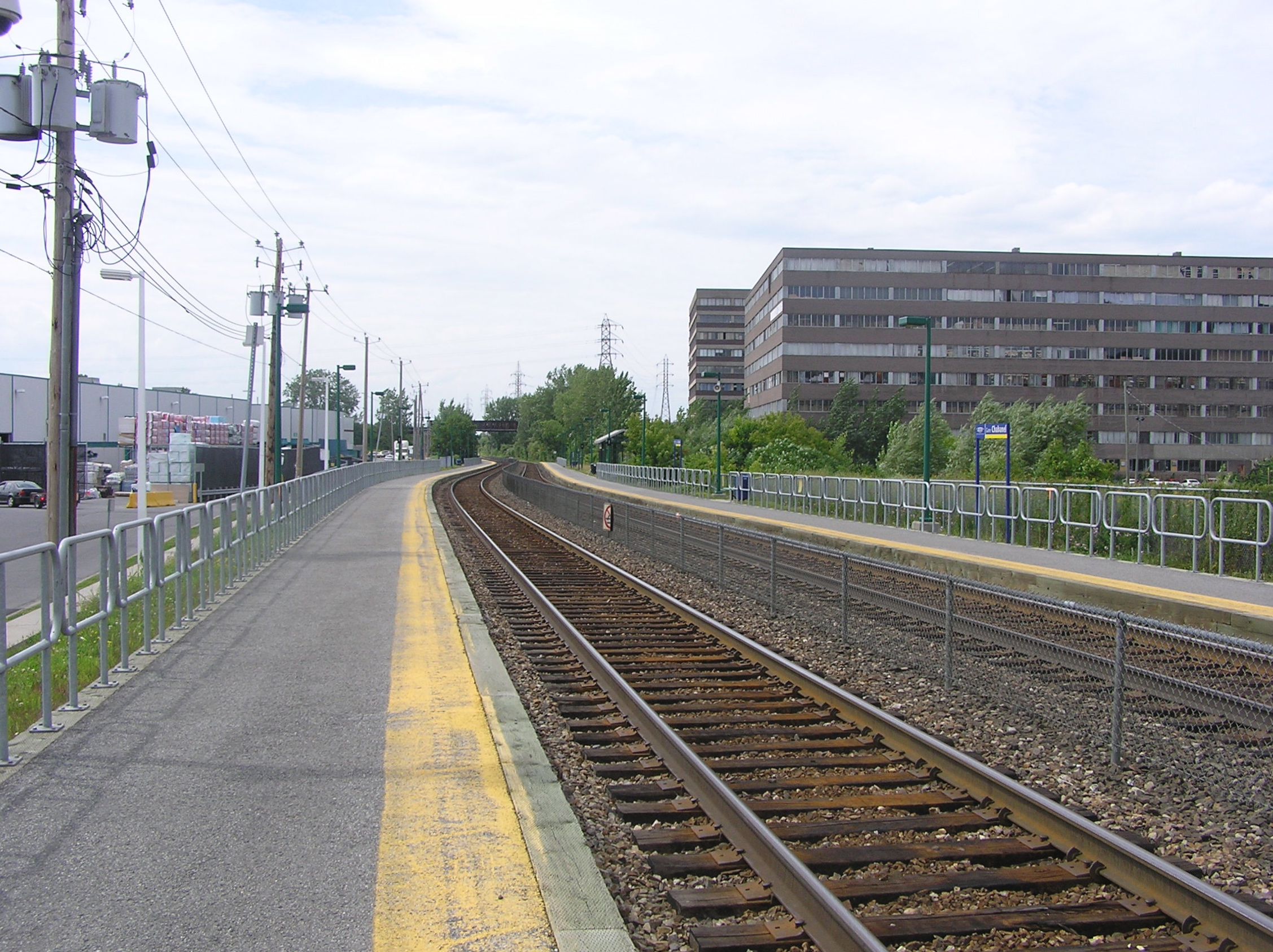

General information
- Location: 625 Chabanel Street West; Montreal, Quebec H4N 3J7
- Coordinates: 45°32′13″N 73°39′28″W
- Operator: Exo
- Platforms: 2 side platforms
- Tracks: 2
- Connections: STM bus

Construction
- Parking: None
- Cycle facilities: Forbidden

Other information
- Fare zone: ARTM: A

History
- Opened: 2008

Passengers
- 2019: 107,500 (Exo)

Services
Preceding station	Exo	Following station
Bois-de-Boulogne toward Saint-Jérôme	Line 12 – Saint-Jérôme	Parc toward Lucien-L'Allier
Location

Chabanel station is a commuter rail station operated by Exo in Montreal, Quebec, Canada. It serves the Saint-Jérôme line. Its name comes from Chabanel street, the street that the station is located on. It is relatively close to the Ahuntsic station, though they are not considered as a transfer site.

== Connecting bus routes ==
Société de transport de Montréal
No.	Route	Connects to	Service times / notes
20	Crémazie / Marché Central	Crémazie; Ahuntsic	Daily
54	Charland / Chabanel	Crémazie; Ahuntsic; Côte-de-Liesse	Daily
140	Fleury	Pie-IX BRT; Sauvé; Ahuntsic	Daily
