= Bois-de-Boulogne station =

Railway station in Montreal, Quebec, Canada

Bois-de-Boulogne
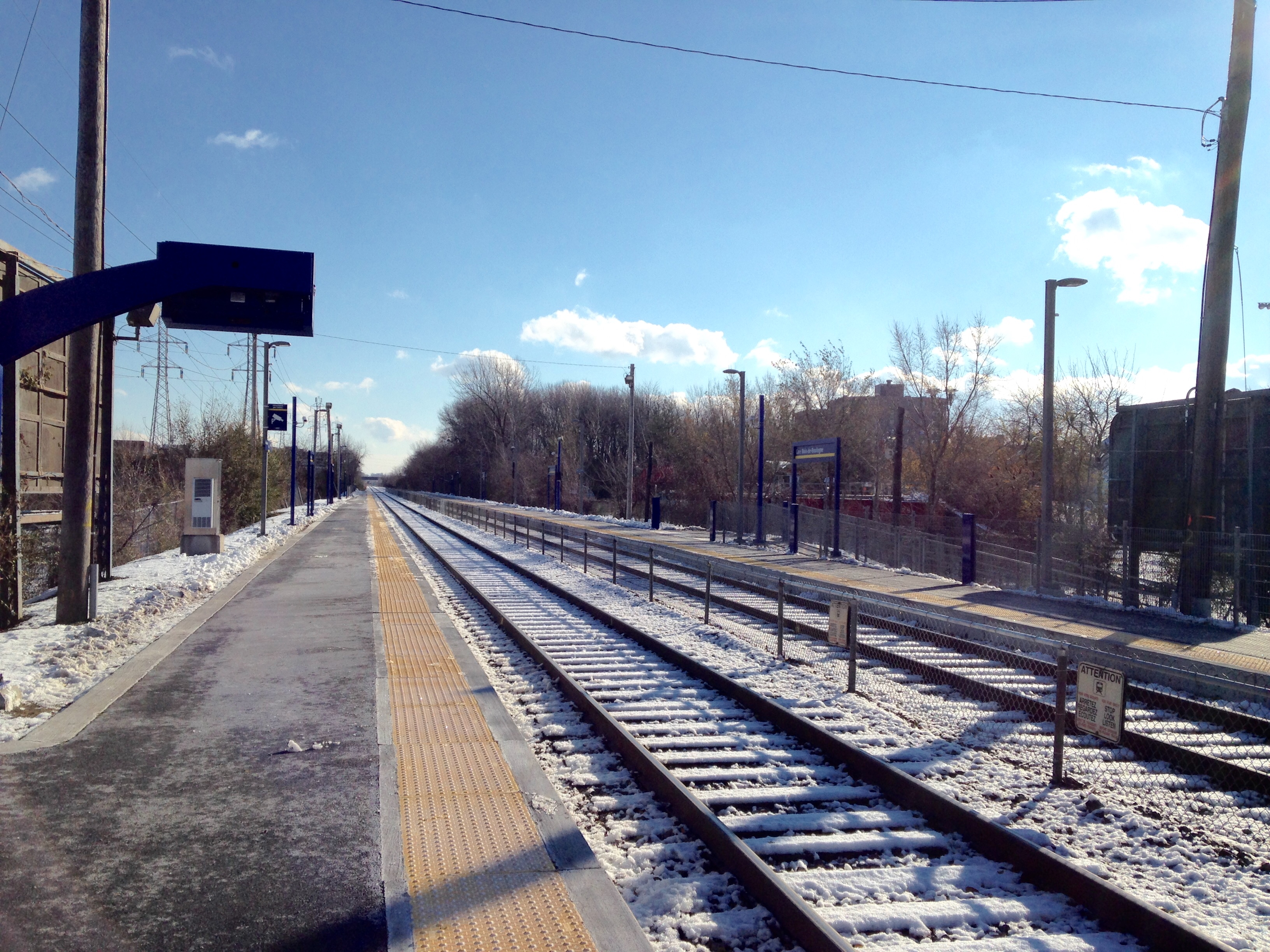

General information
- Location: 1000 Henri-Bourassa Blvd. West; Montreal, Quebec H3M 3G1
- Coordinates: 45°32′25″N 73°40′38″W
- Operator: Exo
- Platforms: 2 side platforms
- Tracks: 2
- Connections: STM bus

Construction
- Parking: None
- Cycle facilities: 7 spaces

Other information
- Fare zone: ARTM: A

Passengers
- 2019: 192,600 (Exo)

Services
Preceding station	Exo	Following station
De la Concorde toward Saint-Jérôme	Line 12 – Saint-Jérôme	Chabanel toward Lucien-L'Allier
Location

Bois-de-Boulogne station (French pronunciation: [bwa də bulɔɲ]) is a commuter rail station operated by Exo in Montreal, Quebec, Canada. It is served by the Saint-Jérôme line.

== Origin of name ==
Bois-de-Boulogne takes its name from the nearby Collège de Bois-de-Boulogne, itself named for the Bois de Boulogne park in France.

From the re-opening of the Saint-Jérôme Line in 1997 until 2000, the name of this station was Henri-Bourassa. It was renamed on January 1, 2001 to avoid confusion with the Henri-Bourassa Metro station.

== Location ==
The station is located at 1000, boulevard Henri-Bourassa Ouest in Montreal. Its closest major intersection is Henri Bourassa Boulevard and Bois-de-Boulogne. It is located about 1 kilometre (0.62 mi) from the Du Ruisseau station on the Réseau express métropolitain.

== Connecting bus routes ==
Société de transport de Montréal
No.	Route	Connects to	Service times / notes
69	Henri-Bourassa	Pie-IX BRT; Henri-Bourassa; Du Ruisseau; Bois-Franc	Daily
164	Dudemaine	Bois-Franc; Henri-Bourassa	Daily
171	Henri-Bourassa	Côte-Vertu; Montpellier; Henri-Bourassa	Daily
380 ☾	Henri-Bourassa	Henri-Bourassa; Montpellier; Côte-Vertu; Du Collège	Night service
Société de transport de Laval
No.	Route	Connects to	Service times / notes
55	Métro Henri-Bourassa - Laval-Ouest	Henri-Bourassa; Du Ruisseau	Weekdays only

== Nearby points of interest ==
- Cégep Bois-de-Boulogne
- SAAQ
