= Collège de Bois-de-Boulogne =

Public college in Montréal, Quebec

Coordinates: 45°32′16″N 73°40′32″W

Collège Bois-de-Boulogne
- Motto: Vivez l'expérience (French)
- Type: public college
- Established: 1967
- Affiliations: ACCC, CCAA, QSSF, AUCC,
- Administrative staff: 450
- Undergraduates: 2700 pre-university and technical students; 4400 adult education and corporate programs
- Location: 10555, avenue de Bois-de-Boulogne; Montreal, Quebec; H4N 1L4
- Campus: Urban/Suburban,
- Sports teams: Cavaliers
- Colours: Blue and Green
- Website: www.bdeb.qc.ca/

The Collège Bois-de-Boulogne (French pronunciation: [kɔlɛʒ də bwa də bulɔɲ]) is a French-language public college located on Bois de Boulogne Street in Montreal, Quebec, Canada. It has an enrollment of approximately 2,700 students in 7 pre-university and technical programmes and 4400 participants in adult education and corporate programmes. The staff consists of over 450 people.

== History ==
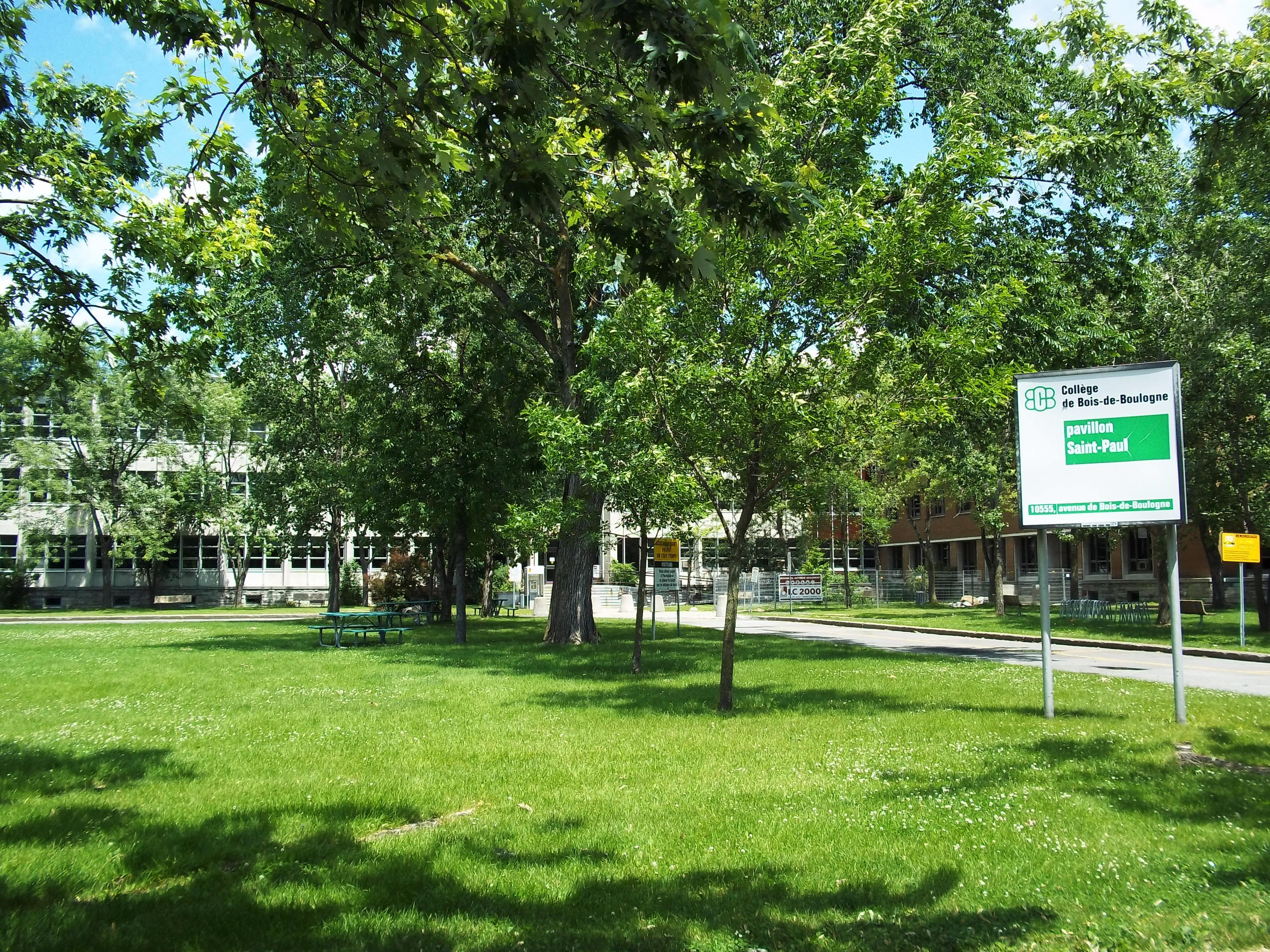
Collège de Bois-de-Boulogne

The college traces its origins to the merger of several institutions which became public ones in 1967, when the Quebec system of CEGEPs was created.

== Programs ==
The Collège Bois-de-Boulogne offers two types of programs: pre-university and technical. The pre-university programs, which take two years to complete, cover the subject matters which roughly correspond to the additional year of high school given elsewhere in Canada in preparation for a chosen field in university. The technical programs, which take three-years to complete, applies to students who wish to pursue a skill trade. In addition Continuing education and services to business are provided.

The Collège Bois-de-Boulogne is considered one of the best public CEGEPs in the province of Quebec and one of the very few public CEGEPs that are considered comparable to Collège Jean-de-Brébeuf and Marianopolis College. The bases of this claim are that 50% of the school's students come from private secondary schools; that 85% of the school's graduating students get accepted in the program of their choice; and that Bois-de-Boulogne has one of the highest percentage of students to get accepted in top programs.

== Public transport ==
It is served by the Bois-de-Boulogne commuter train station on the Saint Jérôme Line, which is named after the college. The STM's 164, 171, 180 and 380 buses and the STL's 55 bus serves here. Henri-Bourassa métro station on the orange line is 1.8 km away.

== Facilities and features ==
The Collège occupies two buildings: le pavillon Saint-Paul, which was formerly the Collège Saint-Paul, and le pavillon Ignace-Bourget, which was formerly the Ignace-Bourget normal school.

== See also ==
- List of colleges in Quebec
- Higher education in Quebec
