= List of STM bus routes =

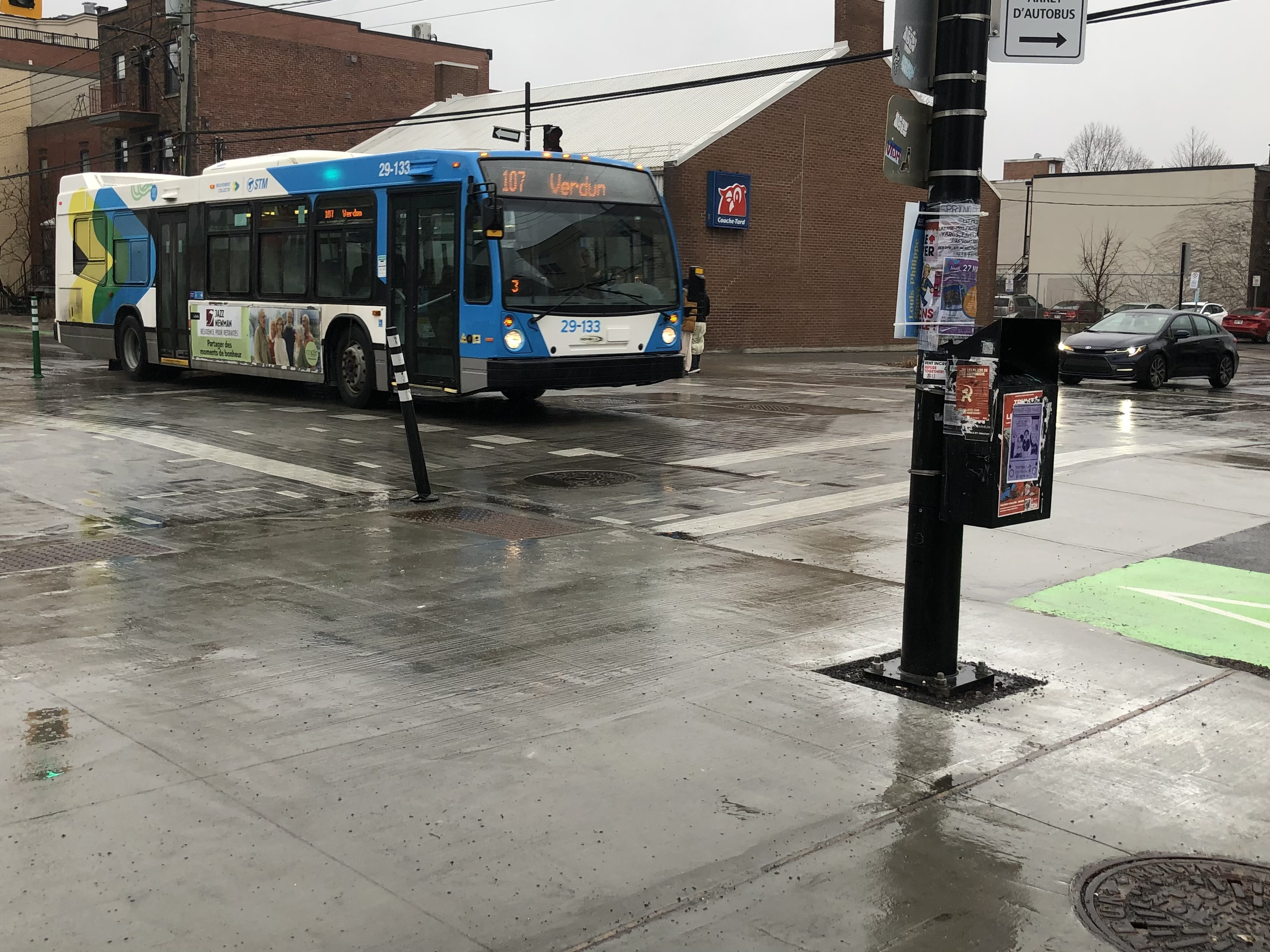
- A Novabus operating on Route 107 Verdun
- Locale: Montreal, Quebec, Canada
- Service area: Island of Montreal
- Service type: Bus service
- Routes: 200 daytime; 23 night; (as of December 2025)
- Fleet: 1 849 (2025); Novabus LFS, Novabus LFS Articulated, Novabus LFS Hybrid, New Flyer XE40
- Daily ridership: 692,000 (weekdays, Q2 2026)
- Annual ridership: 204,156,400 (2025)
- Fuel type: Diesel fuel, Biodiesel, Hybrid, Electric
- Operator: Société de transport de Montréal (STM)
- Chief executive: Marie-Claude Léonard (2022–present)
- Website: Official website

The Société de transport de Montréal (STM) operates 220 daytime and 23 night service routes and provides a vast number of routes for the Island of Montreal, serving an average of 749,500 passengers on an average weekday as of 2025.

A route is referred to by its route number and name (such as 80 Du Parc). The name of the route is usually named after the road or the community that it primarily serves.

Express routes are usually denoted by a 4 before the number of its local equivalent (such as 480 Express Du Parc). However, there are some exceptions (such as 49 Maurice-Duplessis/448 Express Maurice-Duplessis), and some express routes (such as 475 Express Dollard-Des-Ormeaux) have no local equivalents.

Bicycle racks are equipped on bus routes 34, 50, 94, 140, 180, 185, and 769.

== Routes ==
The following is a complete list of all current STM bus routes.

Legend
10-249	Local routes
270-299	Taxibus/Navette OR
XXX	All-day high-frequency routes (Buses run every 2 to 12 mins or less all-day)
XXX	Rush-hour high-frequency routes (Buses run every 2 to 12 mins or less during rush hour)
3XX ☾︎	All-night routes
4XX	Express routes
5XX	Metro / REM rail replacement shuttles (used during service disruptions)
7XX	Shuttle routes
747 ✈	Airport Shuttle
8XX	Temporary shuttle routes

=== Daytime / regular routes ===
No.	Route	Route type	Connects to	Garage	Service times / notes
10	De Lorimier	Local	Papineau	Frontenac	Daily
11	Parc du Mont-Royal	Local	Mont-Royal; Côte-des-Neiges	Mont-Royal	Daily
12	Île-des-Soeurs	Local	De L'Église; Île-des-Soeurs	LaSalle	Daily
13	Christophe-Colomb	Local	Henri-Bourassa; Rosemont	Bellechasse	Daily
14	Atateken	Local	Laurier; Beaudry; Champ-de-Mars	Mont-Royal	Daily
16	Graham	Local	Parc; Acadie; Ville-de-Mont-Royal	Stinson	Daily
17	Décarie	Local	Place-Saint-Henri; Vendôme; Snowdon; Namur; De La Savane; Du Collège; Côte-Vertu	Saint-Laurent	Daily
18	Beaubien	All-day high-frequency	Beaubien; Pie-IX BRT; Honoré-Beaugrand	Bellechasse	Daily
20	Crémazie / Marché Central	Local	Crémazie; Chabanel; Ahuntsic	Legendre	Daily
22	Notre-Dame	Local	Assomption	Frontenac	Daily
24	Sherbrooke	All-day high-frequency	Villa-Maria; Sherbrooke	Frontenac	Daily Some rush hour services start and end at Sherbrooke metro
25	Angus	Local	Rosemont; Préfontaine	Mont-Royal	Weekdays only
26	Mercier-Est	Local	Honoré-Beaugrand; Radisson	Anjou	Daily Limited westbound AM rush service ends at Honoré-Beaugrand Metro Station directly via Sherbrooke
27	Saint-Joseph	Local	Laurier; Pie-IX BRT	Mont-Royal	Daily
28	Honoré-Beaugrand	Local	Honoré-Beaugrand	Anjou	Daily
29	Rachel	Local	Préfontaine; Joliette	Frontenac	Daily
31	Saint-Denis	Local	Henri-Bourassa; Sauvé; Crémazie; Jarry; Jean-Talon; Beaubien; Rosemont; Laurier; Mont-Royal; Sherbrooke	Bellechasse	Daily
32	Lacordaire	Rush-hour high-frequency	Saint-Léonard-Montréal-Nord; Cadillac	Anjou	Daily
33	Langelier	Rush-hour high-frequency	Saint-Léonard-Montréal-Nord; Langelier	Anjou	Daily
34	Sainte-Catherine	Local	Papineau; Viau	Frontenac	Daily
35	Griffintown	Local	Angrignon; Monk; Place-Saint-Henri; Square-Victoria-OACI; McGill	LaSalle	Daily
36	Monk	Local	Angrignon; Monk; Place-Saint-Henri; Square-Victoria-OACI	LaSalle	Daily
37	Jolicoeur	Local	Angrignon; Jolicoeur; LaSalle	LaSalle	Daily
38	De l'Église	Local	Vendôme; De L'Église; LaSalle	LaSalle	Daily
39	Des Grandes-Prairies	Local	Saint-Michel-Montréal-Nord; Pie-IX BRT	Anjou	Weekdays only
40	Henri-Bourassa East	Local	Pointe-aux-Trembles; Anjou	Anjou	Weekdays only
41	Saint-Michel / Ahuntsic	Local	Pie-IX BRT; Saint-Michel-Montréal-Nord; Saint-Michel; Sauvé	Legendre	Weekdays only
43	Monselet	Local	Pie-IX BRT	Legendre	Daily
44	Armand-Bombardier	Rush-hour high-frequency	Radisson	Anjou	Daily
45	Papineau	Rush-hour high-frequency	Fabre; Papineau	Legendre	Daily
47	Masson	Local	Laurier; Pie-IX BRT	Mont-Royal	Daily
48	Perras	Rush-hour high-frequency	Rivière-des-Prairies; Pie-IX BRT; Henri-Bourassa	Legendre	Daily Offers 48X variant with shorter route
49	Maurice Duplessis	Rush-hour high-frequency	Rivière-des-Prairies; Pie-IX BRT; Henri-Bourassa	Legendre	Daily
50	Vieux-Montréal / Vieux-Port	Local	Gare d'autocars de Montréal; Berri-UQAM; Square-Victoria-OACI; Peel	Frontenac	Daily
51	Édouard-Montpetit	All-day high-frequency	Laurier; Édouard-Montpetit; Université-de-Montréal; Snowdon; Montréal-Ouest	Mont-Royal	Daily Some rush hour services start and end at Snowdon metro
52	De Liège	Local	Crémazie	Legendre	Weekdays only
54	Charland / Chabanel	Local	Crémazie; Chabanel; Ahuntsic; Côte-de-Liesse	Legendre	Daily
55	Saint-Laurent	Rush-hour high-frequency	Place-d'Armes; Saint-Laurent; De Castelnau; Henri-Bourassa	Legendre	Daily
56	Saint-Hubert	Local	Henri-Bourassa; Jean-Talon; Beaubien; Rosemont	Legendre	Daily
57	Charlevoix	Local	Charlevoix; Georges-Vanier; Atwater	LaSalle	Daily
61	Wellington	Local	De L'Église; LaSalle; Charlevoix; Bonaventure	LaSalle	Daily Some rush hour services start and end at Charlevoix metro
63	Girouard	Local	Atwater	LaSalle	Monday to Saturday only
64	Grenet	Rush-hour high-frequency	Bois-Franc; Côte-Vertu	Saint-Laurent	Daily
66	The Boulevard	Local	Guy-Concordia	Bellechasse	Daily
67	Saint-Michel	All-day high-frequency	Joliette; Saint-Michel	Legendre	Daily
68	Pierrefonds	Local	Anse-à-l'Orme; Pierrefonds-Roxboro; Sunnybrooke	Saint-Laurent	Daily Connects to Cap-Saint-Jacques Nature Park, only certain trips end at Anse-à-l'Orme station.
69	Henri-Bourassa	Rush-hour high-frequency	Pie-IX BRT; Henri-Bourassa; Bois-de-Boulogne; Du Ruisseau; Bois-Franc	Stinson	Daily
70	Poirier	Local	Côte-Vertu	Saint-Laurent	Daily
71	Pointe-Saint-Charles	Local	Guy-Concordia; De L'Église	LaSalle	Daily
72	Alfred-Nobel	Local	Côte-Vertu; Des Sources; Fairview-Pointe-Claire	Saint-Laurent	Weekdays only
73	Dalton	Local	Du Collège	Saint-Laurent	Weekdays only
74	Bridge	Local	Bonaventure; Gare Centrale; Terminus Centre-ville	Frontenac	Daily
79	Gouin	Local	Henri-Bourassa; Sunnybrooke; Pierrefonds-Roxboro	Legendre	Daily
80	Du Parc	Rush-hour high-frequency	Place-des-Arts; Parc	Stinson	Daily
81	Saint-Jean-Baptiste	Local	Rivière-des-Prairies	Anjou	Daily
85	Hochelaga	Local	Honoré-Beaugrand; Pie-IX BRT; Joliette; Préfontaine; Frontenac	Frontenac	Daily
86	Pointe-aux-Trembles	Local	Pointe-aux-Trembles; Sherbrooke East Park and Ride	Anjou	Daily
90	Saint-Jacques	Rush-hour high-frequency	Vendôme; Atwater; Du Canal	LaSalle	Daily
92	Jean-Talon West	Local	De La Savane; Namur; Canora; Acadie; Parc; De Castelnau; Jean-Talon	Bellechasse	Daily
93	Jean-Talon	Local	Parc; De Castelnau; Jean-Talon; Fabre; D'Iberville; Saint-Michel; Pie-IX BRT	Stinson	Daily
94	D'Iberville	Local	D'Iberville; Frontenac	Frontenac	Daily
95	Bélanger	Local	Jean-Talon; Pie-IX BRT	Bellechasse	Daily
97	Avenue-du-Mont-Royal	Rush-hour high-frequency	Mont-Royal; Pie-IX BRT; Pie-IX	Mont-Royal	Daily
99	Villeray	Local	Jean-Talon	Saint-Denis	Daily
100	Crémazie	Local	Crémazie; Du Collège (westbound only); De La Savane (eastbound only)	Stinson	Daily
101	Saint-Patrick	Local	Lionel-Groulx; Angrignon; Terminus Lafleur / Newman; LaSalle	LaSalle	Weekdays only
102	Somerled	Local	Vendôme	LaSalle	Daily
103	Monkland	Rush-hour high-frequency	Villa-Maria	Stinson	Daily
104	Cavendish	Local	Vendôme; Atwater	LaSalle	Daily
105	Sherbooke	All-day high-frequency	Vendôme; Montréal-Ouest	Stinson	Daily
106	Newman	Rush-hour high-frequency	Angrignon; Terminus Lafleur / Newman	LaSalle	Daily
107	Verdun	Rush-hour high-frequency	Verdun; LaSalle; Square-Victoria-OACI	LaSalle	Daily
108	Bannantyne	Local	LaSalle; Atwater; Lionel-Groulx	LaSalle	Daily
110	Centrale	Local	LaSalle; Angrignon	LaSalle	Daily
112	Airlie	Rush-hour high-frequency	Jolicoeur; Terminus Lafleur / Newman	LaSalle	Daily
113	Lapierre	Local	Angrignon; Terminus Lafleur / Newman	LaSalle	Daily
114	Angrignon	Local	Angrignon	LaSalle	Daily
117	O'Brien	Local	Du Ruisseau; Du Collège	Saint-Laurent	Daily
119	Rockland	Local	Ville-de-Mont-Royal; Outremont; Laurier	Stinson	Daily
120	Royalmount	Local	Namur; De La Savane	Stinson	Weekdays only
121	Sauvé / Côte-Vertu	All-day high-frequency	Côte-Vertu; Montpellier; Ahuntsic; Sauvé	Legendre	Daily
123	Dollard / Shevchenko	Local	Montréal-Ouest	LaSalle	Daily
124	Victoria	Local	Vendôme; Côte-Sainte-Catherine; Plamondon; Côte-de-Liesse	Stinson	Daily
125	Ontario	Local	McGill; Place-des-Arts; Frontenac; Viau	Frontenac	Daily
127	Alexis-Nihon	Local	Bois-Franc; Du Collège	Saint-Laurent	Daily
128	Saint-Laurent	Local	Montpellier; Côte-Vertu; Du Collège; Côte-de-Liesse	Stinson	Daily
129	Côte-Sainte-Catherine	Local	Côte-Sainte-Catherine; Place-des-Arts; Champ-de-Mars	Bellechasse	Daily
131	De l'Assomption	Local	Assomption	Frontenac	Daily
136	Viau	Rush-hour high-frequency	Viau	Frontenac	Daily
138	Notre-Dame-de-Grâce	Local	Atwater	LaSalle	Daily
139	Pie-IX	Local	Pie-IX BRT; Saint-Michel-Montréal-Nord; Pie-IX	Legendre	Daily
140	Fleury	Local	Pie-IX BRT; Sauvé; Chabanel; Ahuntsic	Legendre	Daily
141	Jean-Talon East	All-day high-frequency	Honoré-Beaugrand; Pie-IX BRT; Saint-Michel	Anjou	Daily
144	Des Pins	Local	Sherbrooke; Atwater	Bellechasse	Daily
150	René-Lévesque	Local	Atwater; Bonaventure; Gare Centrale; Terminus Centre-ville; Lucien-L'Allier; Papineau	Frontenac	Daily
155	Wilderton	Local	Canora; Édouard-Montpetit; Université-de-Montréal; Côte-des-Neiges	Stinson	Weekdays, peak only
160	Barclay	Rush-hour high-frequency	Beaubien; Canora; Plamondon	Stinson	Daily
161	Van Horne	All-day high-frequency	Rosemont; Outremont; Plamondon	Bellechasse	Daily
162	Westminster	Local	Montréal-Ouest; Villa-Maria	Stinson	Daily
164	Dudemaine	Local	Bois-Franc; Bois-de-Boulogne; Henri-Bourassa	Saint-Laurent	Daily
165	Côte-des-Neiges	All-day high-frequency	Ville-de-Mont-Royal; Côte-des-Neiges; Guy-Concordia	Stinson	Daily
166	Queen-Mary	Local	Snowdon; Guy-Concordia	Stinson	Daily Serves Ridgewood after 9PM
168	Cité-du-Havre	Local	Île-des-Soeurs; Square-Victoria-OACI; McGill	Frontenac	Daily
170	Keller	Local	Bois-Franc; Côte-Vertu	Saint-Laurent	Daily
171	Henri-Bourassa	Local	Côte-Vertu; Montpellier; Bois-de-Boulogne; Henri-Bourassa	Stinson	Daily
172	Du Golf	Local	Île-des-Soeurs	Frontenac	Weekdays only
174	Côte-Vertu	Local	Côte-Vertu; Montpellier	Saint-Laurent	Weekdays only
175	Griffith	Local	Du Collège	Stinson	Weekdays only
176	Berlioz	Local	Île-des-Soeurs	Frontenac	Daily
177	Thimens	Local	Côte-Vertu; Montpellier	Saint-Laurent	Daily
179	De l'Acadie	Local	Acadie; Ahuntsic	Bellechasse	Daily
180	De Salaberry	Local	Sauvé; Ahuntsic	Legendre	Daily
183	Gouin East	Local		Anjou	Daily
185	Sherbrooke	Local	Honoré-Beaugrand; Radisson; Langelier; Cadillac; Frontenac	Frontenac	Daily
186	Sherbrooke East	Local	Pointe-aux-Trembles; Sherbrooke East Park and Ride; Honoré-Beaugrand	Anjou	Daily
187	René-Lévesque	Rush-hour high-frequency	Honoré-Beaugrand	Anjou	Daily
188	Couture	Local	Saint-Michel; Pie-IX BRT	Anjou	Weekdays only
189	Notre-Dame	Local	Honoré-Beaugrand	Anjou	Daily
190	Norman	Local	Place-Saint-Henri; Lionel-Groulx	LaSalle	Weekdays only
192	Robert	Local	Pie-IX BRT; Crémazie	Anjou	Daily
193	Jarry	Rush-hour high-frequency	Pie-IX BRT; Jarry	Legendre	Daily
195	Dorval / Angrignon	Local	Dorval; Angrignon	LaSalle	Daily
196	Parc-Industriel-Lachine	Rush-hour high-frequency	Côte-Vertu	Saint-Laurent	Daily Some runs start and end at Terminus CAE
197	Rosemont	Rush-hour high-frequency	Langelier; Pie-IX BRT; Rosemont	Bellechasse	Daily
198	Broadway	Local	Angrignon; Dorval	LaSalle	Daily
200	Sainte-Anne-de-Bellevue	Local	Fairview-Pointe-Claire; Beaconsfield	Saint-Laurent	Daily
201	Saint-Charles	Local	Beaconsfield	Saint-Laurent	Daily
202	Dawson	Local	Côte-de-Liesse; Du Collège; Dorval; Cedar Park; Fairview-Pointe-Claire	Saint-Laurent	Daily
203	Carson	Local	Fairview-Pointe-Claire; Pointe-Claire; Valois; Dorval	Saint-Laurent	Daily
204	Cardinal	Local	Des Sources; Pine Beach; Valois; Dorval	Saint-Laurent	Daily Connects to Montréal-Trudeau International Airport
205	Gouin	Local	Pierrefonds-Roxboro; Fairview-Pointe-Claire	Saint-Laurent	Daily
206	Roger-Pilon	Local	Pierrefonds-Roxboro; Fairview-Pointe-Claire	Saint-Laurent	Daily
207	Jacques-Bizard	Local	Fairview-Pointe-Claire	Saint-Laurent	Daily
208	Brunswick	Local	Pierrefonds-Roxboro; Sunnybrooke; Fairview-Pointe-Claire	Saint-Laurent	Daily
209	Des Sources / YUL Aéroport	Local	Pierrefonds-Roxboro; Des Sources; Dorval	Saint-Laurent	Daily Connects to Montréal-Trudeau International Airport
210	John Abbott	Local	Anse-à-l'Orme	Saint-Laurent	Weekdays and Weekend service is summer only, which the route is extended to Zoo Ecomuseum
211	Bord-du-Lac	Local	Kirkland; Beaconsfield; Pine Beach; Pointe-Claire; Dorval; Lionel-Groulx	LaSalle	Daily
212	Sainte-Anne	Local	Anse-à-l'Orme; Sainte-Anne-de-Bellevue	Saint-Laurent	Daily
214	Stuart-Graham / YUL Aéroport	Local	Dorval	Saint-Laurent	Daily
215	Henri-Bourassa	Local	Côte-Vertu; Bois-Franc; Fairview-Pointe-Claire	Saint-Laurent	Daily
216	Transcanadienne	Local	Côte-Vertu; Des Sources	Saint-Laurent	Weekdays only
218	Antoine-Faucon	Local	Fairview-Pointe-Claire	Saint-Laurent	Daily
220	Kieran	Local	Du Collège	Saint-Laurent	Weekdays only
221	Saint-Jean	Local	Fairview-Pointe-Claire; Beaconsfield; Cedar Park	Saint-Laurent	Daily
222	Senneville	Local	Anse-à-l'Orme	Saint-Laurent	Weekdays, peak only
223	Parc industriel Baie-D'Urfé	Local	Anse-à-l'Orme	Saint-Laurent	Weekdays only
225	Hymus	Local	Côte-Vertu; Des Sources; Fairview-Pointe-Claire	Saint-Laurent	Weekdays only
227	Île-Bizard	Local	Fairview-Pointe-Claire	Saint-Laurent	Weekdays, peak only
229	Transcanadienne / Brunswick	Local	Anse-à-l'Orme; Kirkland; Fairview-Pointe-Claire	Saint-Laurent	Weekdays only
230	Saint-Louis	Local	Fairview-Pointe-Claire; Cedar Park; Des Sources	Saint-Laurent	Daily Peak only goes to Cedar Park
410	Express Notre-Dame	Express	Bonaventure; Gare Centrale; Terminus Centre-ville; Lucien-L'Allier	Mont-Royal	Weekdays, peak only
411	Express Lionel-Groulx	Express	Pointe-Claire; Pine Beach; Dorval; Lionel-Groulx	LaSalle	Daily
420	Express Notre-Dame-de-Grâce	Express	Peel; McGill; Lucien-L'Allier; Bonaventure; Gare Centrale; Terminus Centre-ville	LaSalle	Weekdays only
428	Express Parcs Industriels de l'Est	Express	Rivière-des-Prairies; Radisson	Anjou	Weekdays, peak only
430	Express Pointe-aux-Trembles	Express	Pointe-aux-Trembles; Sherbrooke East Park and Ride; Bonaventure; Gare Centrale; Terminus Centre-ville; Lucien-L'Allier	Mont-Royal	Weekdays only
432	Express Lacordaire	Express	Cadillac; Radisson; Saint-Léonard-Montréal-Nord	Anjou	Weekdays only Certain trips start or end at Radisson station
439	Express Pie-IX	Bus rapid transit	Saint-Michel-Montréal-Nord; Pie-IX	Legendre	Daily Main route of the Pie-IX BRT Certain trips end at Saint-Martin Park and Ride in Laval and other at Cégep Marie-Victorin
440	Express Charleroi	Express	Sauvé; Saint-Michel-Montréal-Nord; Pie-IX BRT; Saint-Léonard-Montréal-Nord	Legendre	Weekdays, peak only
444	Express Cégep Marie-Victorin	Express	Radisson	Anjou	Weekdays only No summer service
445	Express Papineau	Express	Papineau; Bonaventure; Gare Centrale; Terminus Centre-ville	Bellechasse	Weekdays, peak only
448	Express Maurice-Duplessis	Express	Radisson	Anjou	Weekdays, peak only
449	Express Rivière-des-Prairies	Express	Radisson; Rivière-des-Prairies	Anjou	Weekdays only
460	Express Métropolitaine	Express	Crémazie; De La Savane (eastbound); Du Collège (westbound); Dorval	Legendre	Weekdays only Certain trips start or end at Montréal-Trudeau International Airport
467	Express Saint-Michel	Express	Joliette; Saint-Michel	Legendre	Weekdays only
468	Express Pierrefonds / Gouin	Express	Côte-Vertu; Sunnybrooke; Pierrefonds-Roxboro	Saint-Laurent	Daily
469	Express Henri-Bourassa	Express	Henri-Bourassa	Legendre	Weekdays only
470	Express Pierrefonds	Rush-hour high-frequency	Fairview-Pointe-Claire; Côte-Vertu	Stinson	Daily
475	Express Dollard-des-Ormeaux	Express	Côte-Vertu; Du Collège	Saint-Laurent	Weekdays, peak only
480	Express Du Parc	Express	Parc; Place-des-Arts; Bonaventure; Gare Centrale; Terminus Centre-ville; Lucien-L'Allier	Stinson	Weekdays, peak only
486	Express Sherbrooke	Express	Pointe-aux-Trembles; Sherbrooke East Park and Ride; Honoré-Beaugrand	Anjou	Weekdays, peak only
487	Express Bout-de-l'Île	Express	Honoré-Beaugrand	Anjou	Weekdays, peak only
491	Express Provost	Express	Lionel-Groulx	LaSalle	Weekdays only
496	Express Victoria	Rush-hour high-frequency	Lionel-Groulx; Dorval	LaSalle	Daily
711	Parc du Mont-Royal / Oratoire	Shuttle	Mont-Royal; Snowdon	Stinson	Runs 7 days a week during the summer and weekends only the rest of the year
720	Omnium Tennis	Shuttle			
730	Alouettes	Shuttle			
747 ✈	YUL Airport / Downtown	Airport Shuttle	Gare d'autocars de Montréal; Berri-UQAM; Bonaventure; Gare Centrale; Terminus Centre-ville; Lucien-L'Allier; Lionel-Groulx	Stinson	Daily Some runs start or end at Lionel-Groulx Metro Station
767	La Ronde / Station Jean-Drapeau	Shuttle	Jean-Drapeau	Frontenac	Summer weekends only, serves La Ronde
768	Jean-Doré Beach	Shuttle	Jean-Drapeau	Frontenac	Seasonal (summer only)
769	La Ronde / Station Papineau	Shuttle	Papineau	Frontenac	Summer weekends only, serves La Ronde
777	Station Jean-Drapeau / Casino / Bonaventure	Shuttle	Jean-Drapeau; Bonaventure; Gare Centrale; Terminus Centre-ville	Frontenac	Daily

=== All-night routes ===
No.	Route	Route type	Connects to	Garage	Service times / notes
350 ☾	Verdun / LaSalle	All-night	Frontenac; Bonaventure; Gare Centrale; Terminus Centre-ville; Lucien-L'Allier; Atwater; Lionel-Groulx; LaSalle; De L'Église; Verdun; Jolicoeur; Monk; Angrignon	LaSalle	Night service
353 ☾	Lacordaire / Maurice-Duplessis	All-night	Viau; Frontenac	Anjou	Night service
354 ☾	Sainte-Anne-de-Bellevue / Centre-ville	All-night	Atwater; Dorval; Pointe-Claire; Beaconsfield; Beaurepaire; Baie d'Urfé; Sainte-Anne-de-Bellevue	LaSalle	Night service
355 ☾	Pie-IX	All-night	Saint-Michel-Montréal-Nord; Pie-IX; Frontenac; Bonaventure; Gare Centrale; Terminus Centre-ville; Lucien-L'Allier; Atwater	Frontenac	Night service
356 ☾	Lachine / YUL Aéroport / Des Sources	All-night	Frontenac; Atwater; Montréal-Ouest; Du Canal; Dorval; Des Sources; Sunnybrooke; Pierrefonds-Roxboro	LaSalle	Night service Connects to Montréal-Trudeau International Airport
357 ☾	Saint-Michel	All-night	Frontenac; Saint-Michel	Frontenac	Night service
358 ☾	René-Lévesque	All-night	Frontenac; Papineau; Bonaventure; Gare Centrale; Terminus Centre-ville; Lucien-L'Allier; Atwater	Frontenac	Night service
359 ☾	Papineau	All-night	Papineau; Fabre	Mont-Royal	Night service
360 ☾	Des Pins	All-night	Frontenac; Sherbrooke; Atwater	LaSalle	Night service
361 ☾	Saint-Denis	All-night	Replaces the Orange Line from Henri-Bourassa to Place-d'Armes	Bellechasse	Night service
362 ☾	Hochelaga / Notre-Dame	All-night	Honoré-Beaugrand; Joliette; Préfontaine; Frontenac	Anjou	Night service
363 ☾	Saint-Laurent	All-night	Henri-Bourassa; De Castelnau; Place-des-Arts (southbound); Saint-Laurent (northbound); Place-d'Armes	Bellechasse	Night service
364 ☾	Sherbrooke / Joseph-Renaud	All-night	Honoré-Beaugrand; Radisson; Langelier; Cadillac; Frontenac; Bonaventure; Gare Centrale; Terminus Centre-ville; Lucien-L'Allier; Atwater	Anjou	Night service
365 ☾	Du Parc	All-night	Place-d'Armes; Place-des-Arts; Parc; Acadie; Ahuntsic	Legendre	Night service
368 ☾	Avenue-Du-Mont-Royal	All-night	Frontenac; Édouard-Montpetit; Université-de-Montréal; Côte-Sainte-Catherine; Plamondon; Namur; De La Savane; Côte-Vertu	Mont-Royal	Night service
369 ☾	Côte-des-Neiges	All-night	Namur; Côte-des-Neiges; Guy-Concordia; Atwater	Stinson	Night service
370 ☾	Rosemont	All-night	Honoré-Beaugrand; Radisson; Langelier; Rosemont; Outremont; Plamondon	Bellechasse	Night service
371 ☾	Décarie	All-night	Côte-Vertu; Du Collège; De La Savane; Namur; Snowdon; Place-Saint-Henri; Lionel-Groulx; Atwater	Stinson	Night service
372 ☾	Jean-Talon	All-night	Saint-Michel; D'Iberville; Fabre; Jean-Talon; De Castelnau; Parc; Acadie; Canora; Namur	Anjou	Night service
376 ☾	Pierrefonds / Centre-ville	All-night	Atwater; Namur	Saint-Laurent	Night service
378 ☾	Sauvé / YUL Aéroport	All-night	Sauvé; Montpellier; Côte-Vertu; Du Collège; Dorval	Saint-Laurent	Night service Connects to Montréal–Trudeau International Airport
380 ☾	Henri-Bourassa	All-night	Henri-Bourassa; Bois-de-Boulogne; Montpellier; Côte-Vertu; Du Collège	Stinson	Night service
382 ☾	Pierrefonds / Saint-Charles	All-night	Namur; De La Savane; Du Collège; Côte-Vertu; Bois-Franc; Sunnybrooke; Pierrefonds-Roxboro; Beaconsfield	Saint-Laurent	Night service

=== Special routes ===
No.	Route	Route type	Connects to	Garage	Service times / notes
501	Service provisoire Ligne 1 Verte	Rail replacement			Used in case of a service disruption on the Green Line
502	Service provisoire Ligne 2 Orange	Rail replacement			Used in case of a major service disruption on the Orange Line
504	Service provisoire Ligne 4 Jaune	Rail replacement			Used in case of a service disruption on the Yellow Line
505	Service provisoire Ligne 5 Bleue	Rail replacement			Used in case of a service disruption on the Blue Line
521	REM Anse-à-l'Orme / Kirkland / Côte-Vertu	Rail replacement	Côte-Vertu; Anse-à-l'Orme; Kirkland		Used in case of a service disruption on the REM
522	REM Bois-Franc / Du Collège	Rail replacement	Du Collège; Bois-Franc		Used in case of a service disruption on the REM
523	REM Anse-à-l'Orme / Kirkland / Fairview-Pointe-Claire	Rail replacement	Fairview-Pointe-Claire; Kirkland; Anse-à-l'Orme		Used in case of a service disruption on the REM
524	REM Anse-à-l'Orme / Kirkland / Fairview-Pointe-Claire / Des Sources / Boie-Franc	Rail replacement	Fairview-Pointe-Claire; Kirkland; Anse-à-l'Orme; Des Sources; Bois-Franc		Used in case of a service disruption on the REM
525	REM Anse-à-l'Orme / Kirkland / Fairview-Pointe-Claire / Des Sources / Côte-Vertu	Rail replacement	Côte-Vertu; Fairview-Pointe-Claire; Kirkland; Anse-à-l'Orme; Des Sources		Used in case of a service disruption on the REM
526	REM Côte-de-Liesse / Du Collège	Rail replacement	Du Collège; Côte-de-Liesse		Used in case of a service disruption on the REM
527	REM Côte-de-Liesse / Montpellier / Du Ruisseau / Boie-Franc	Rail replacement	Bois-Franc; Du Ruisseau; Montpellier; Côte-de-Liesse		Used in case of a service disruption on the REM
528	REM Fairview-Pointe-Claire / Des Sources / Côte-Vertu	Rail replacement	Côte-Vertu; Fairview-Pointe-Claire; Des Sources		Used in case of a service disruption on the REM
568	Navette REM - Gare Centrale / Île-des-Soeurs	Rail replacement	Central Station; Île-des-Soeurs		Used in case of a service disruption on the REM between Montreal Central Station & Île-des-Soeurs station
804	Belvédère Kondiaronk	Temporary shuttle	Laurier		Sunday mornings during the summer
809	Shuttle	Temporary shuttle			Used as special events shuttles
811	Health Services Shuttle	Temporary shuttle	Radisson; Langelier; Cadillac; Assomption	Frontenac	Weekdays only Created to compensate for construction on Louis-Hippolyte Lafontaine Bridge–Tunnel
814	Jean-Talon / Bélanger	Temporary Shuttle		Anjou	Daily
822	Longue-Pointe Shuttle	Temporary shuttle	Radisson; Langelier	Anjou	Weekdays only Created to compensate for construction on Louis-Hippolyte Lafontaine Bridge–Tunnel
872	Île-des-Soeurs Shuttle	Temporary shuttle	McGill; Square-Victoria-OACI; Île-des-Soeurs	Frontenac	Weekdays, peak only Created to act as a temporary measure until the opening of the entire REM network

=== Taxibus / Navette Or ===
No.	Route	Route type	Connects to	Operator	Service times / notes
270	Pointe-Claire - Navette Or by taxi	Navette Or	Valois; Terminus Fairview	Pointe-Claire City	
271	Dorval - Navette OR by taxi	Navette Or	Pine Beach	City of Dorval	
272	Île-des-Sœurs - Navette Or by taxi	Navette Or			
281	Senneville / Sainte-Anne-de-Bellevue	Taxibus	Anse-à-l'Orme; Sainte-Anne-de-Bellevue	VECO	
282	Côte-Vertu Ouest	Taxibus	Côte-Vertu; Montpellier; Terminus Côte-Vertu	VECO	Weekends only
283	Technoparc Montréal	Taxibus	Sunnybrooke; Marie-Curie	VECO	Rush hour only
284	Baie-D’Urfé	Taxibus	Baie d'Urfé	VECO	
285	Gare Anjou – Rivière-des-Prairies	Taxibus	Anjou	Taxelco	
287	Gare Lachine	Taxibus	Lachine	Coop de l'Ouest	
288	Gare Anjou – Parc industriel	Taxibus	Anjou	Taxelco	
289	Pointe-aux-Prairies	Taxibus	Rivière-des-Prairies	Taxelco	
290	Île-Bizard	Taxibus		VECO	
292	Parc Jean-Drapeau	Taxibus	Jean-Drapeau	Taxelco	Winter season only
293	Parc industriel Lachine - Gare Dorval	Taxibus	Dorval; Dorval (Via Rail)	Coop de l'Ouest	Late evenings & Weekends only
294	Parc industriel Baie-D'Urfé	Taxibus	Anse-à-l'Orme; Baie-D'Urfé	VECO	Weekend & Holidays only
295	Beaurepaire	Taxibus	Beaurepaire	VECO	Weekdays only

== See also ==
- List of Montreal Metro stations
