= Côte-de-Liesse station =

Railway station in Montreal, Quebec, Canada

Côte-de-Liesse
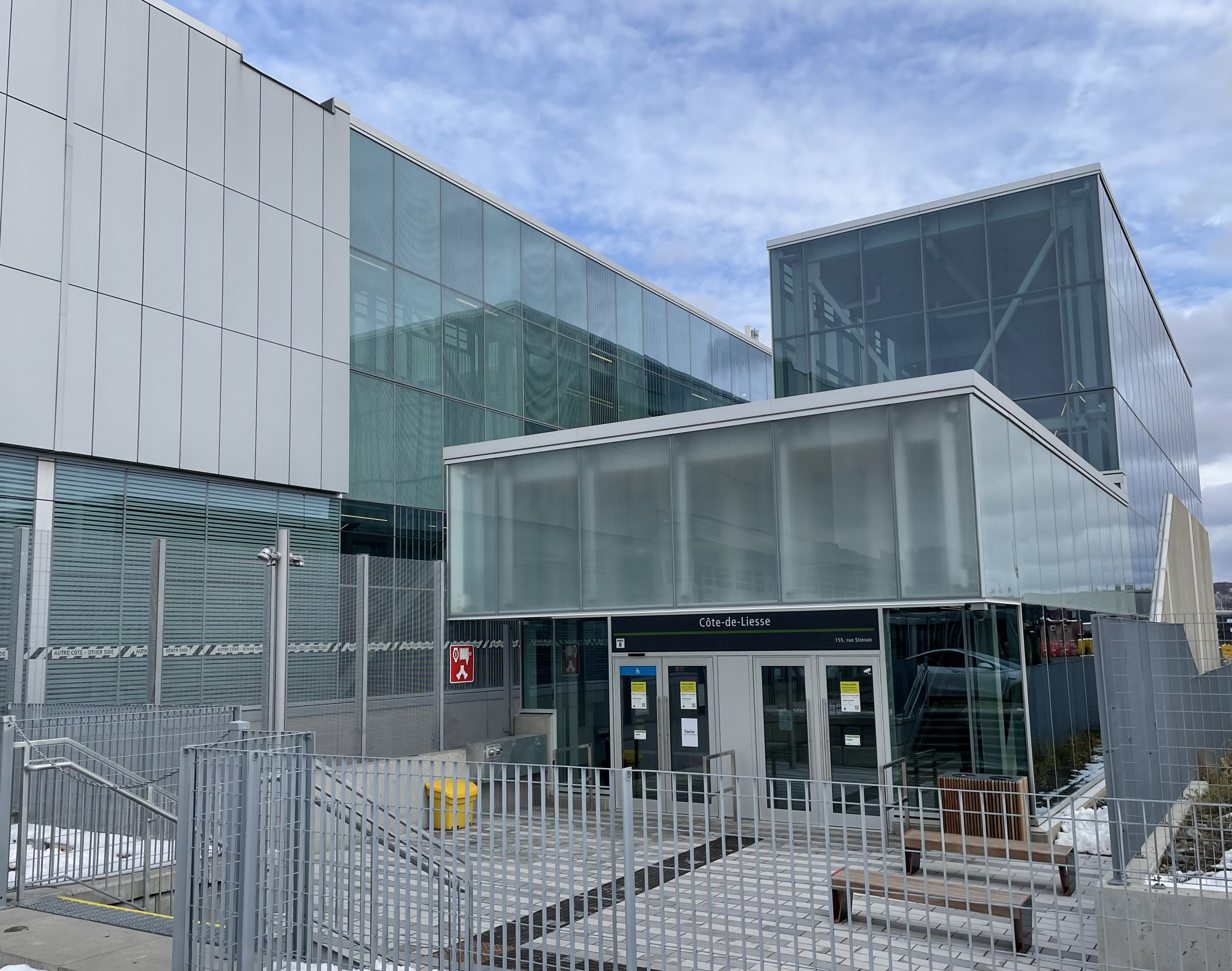
- Station entrance on the Stinson Street side

General information
- Location: 260 Deslauriers Street; Montreal, Quebec; Canada
- Coordinates: 45°31′18″N 73°39′39″W
- Operator: Pulsar (AtkinsRéalis and Alstom)
- Platforms: 2 island platforms
- Tracks: REM: 3; Exo: 1
- Connections: STM bus

Construction
- Structure type: At-grade
- Cycle facilities: 36 rack spaces
- Accessible: Yes

Other information
- Station code: REM: A40
- Fare zone: ARTM: A
- Website: rem.info/en/travelling/stations/cote-de-liesse

History
- Opened: REM: November 17, 2025; Exo: January 12, 2026

Services
Preceding station	REM	Following station
Montpellier toward Deux-Montagnes or Anse-à-l'Orme	Réseau express métropolitain	Ville-de-Mont-Royal toward Brossard
Preceding station	Exo	Following station
Ahuntsic toward Mascouche	Line 15 – Mascouche	Terminus
Future services
Preceding station	REM	Following station
Montpellier toward Airport	Réseau express métropolitain (opens 2027)	Ville-de-Mont-Royal toward Brossard
Track layout
Location

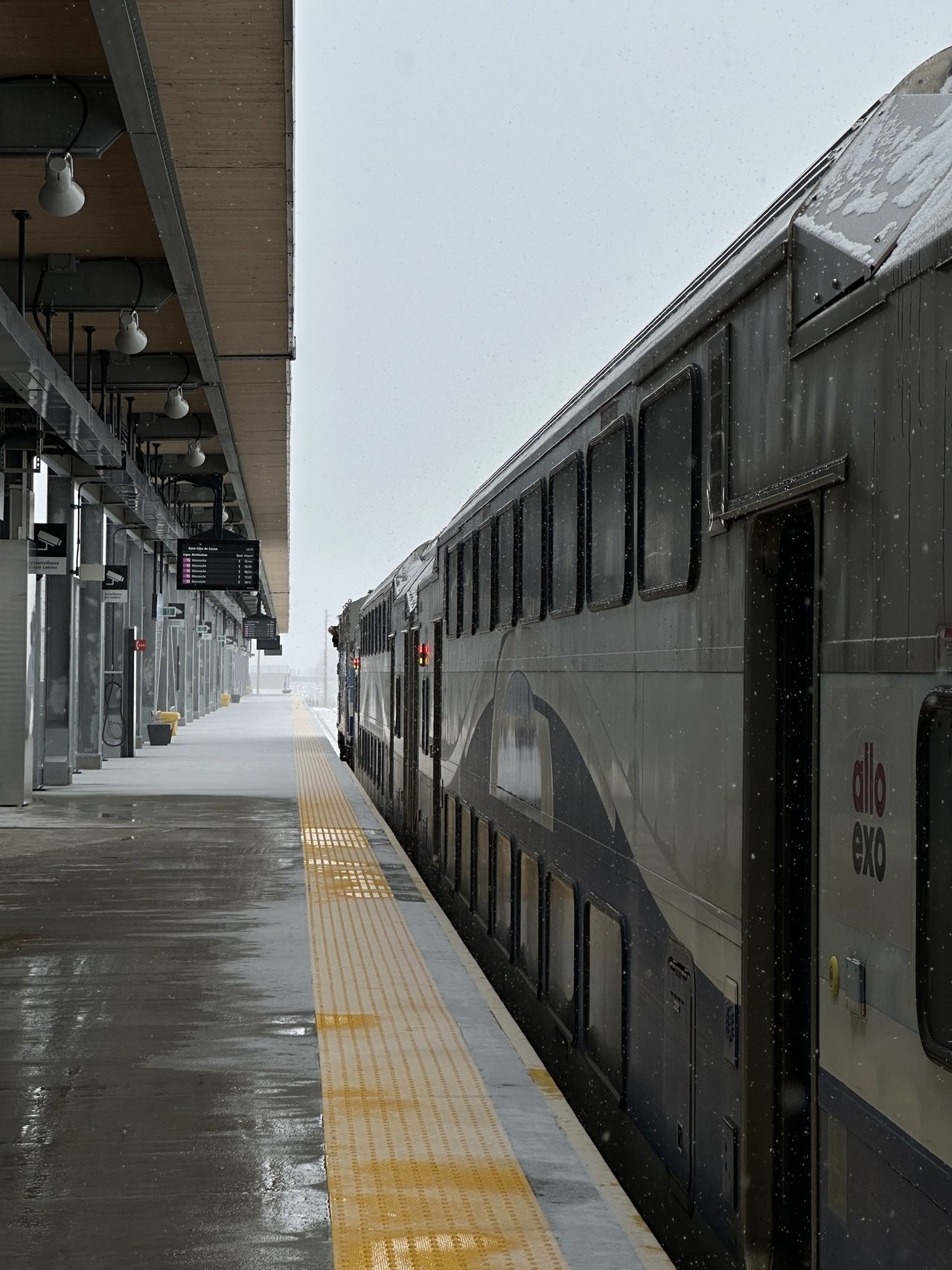
Exo Train at the Exo Platform at Station Cote-de-Liesse

Côte-de-Liesse (French pronunciation: [kotdəljɛs]) is an interchange station in the Saint-Laurent borough of Montreal, Quebec, Canada. It is operated by CDPQ Infra and serves the Réseau express métropolitain (REM) system. It is also the terminus of Exo's Mascouche line. The station was known as Correspondance A-40 during development, named after the nearby Quebec Autoroute 40, and has been renamed after Chemin de la Côte-de-Liesse, the service road accessing Quebec Autoroute 40.

The REM station opened on November 17, 2025. The Mascouche line platform came into service on January 12, 2026.

== Facilities ==
The station is built at ground level along the main trunk of the REM line. It has two island platforms. The eastern island serves northbound REM trains on its west face (platform 1); on its east face, outside the station building, is the single high-level platform for the Mascouche line, with doors into the building at either end of the platform. The western island serves southbound REM trains on its east face (platform 2), while its west face (platform 3) is an auxiliary platform where trains can wait to provide additional service when needed, similar to the arrangement at Brossard station.

The two platforms are connected by overpasses over the central tracks at either end. The overpass at the south end also passes over the side tracks to reach entrances at either side of the station: Rue Deslauriers at Rue Benjamin-Hudon to the east (entrance A) and Rue Stinson at Rue Hodge to the west (entrance B). The station is supplied with four elevators for accessibility: one at each exit and one to each island platform.

== Connecting bus routes ==
Société de transport de Montréal
No.	Route	Connects to	Service times / notes
54	Charland / Chabanel	Crémazie; Chabanel; Ahuntsic	Daily
124	Victoria	Vendôme; Côte-Sainte-Catherine; Plamondon	Daily
128	Saint-Laurent	Montpellier; Côte-Vertu; Du Collège	Daily
202	Dawson	Du Collège; Dorval; Cedar Park; Fairview-Pointe-Claire	Daily
526	REM Côte-de-Liesse / Du Collège	Du Collège	Used in case of a service disruption on the REM
527	REM Côte-de-Liesse / Montpellier / Du Ruisseau / Bois-Franc	Montpellier; Du Ruisseau; Bois-Franc	Used in case of a service disruption on the REM
TA ♿︎	STM Transport adapté		
