= Henri-Bourassa Boulevard =

Thoroughfare in Montreal, Canada

Coordinates: 45°33′03″N 73°40′14″W

- Interactive map of Henri-Bourassa Boulevard
- Native name: Boulevard Henri-Bourassa (French)
- Former names: rue Kelly, boulevard Paradis
- Length: 29 km (18 mi)
- Location: Montreal
- West end: A-40 (TCH) in Saint-Laurent (continues as Hymus Boulevard)
- Major junctions: A-13 in Saint-Laurent; R-117 in Saint-Laurent; A-15 in Ahuntsic-Cartierville; R-335 in Ahuntsic-Cartierville; A-19; R-125 in Montreal-Nord; A-25 in Anjou; A-40 in Pointe-aux-Trembles
- East end: R-138 Sherbrooke Street East in Riviere-des-Prairies–Pointe-aux-Trembles

Construction
- Inauguration: 1954

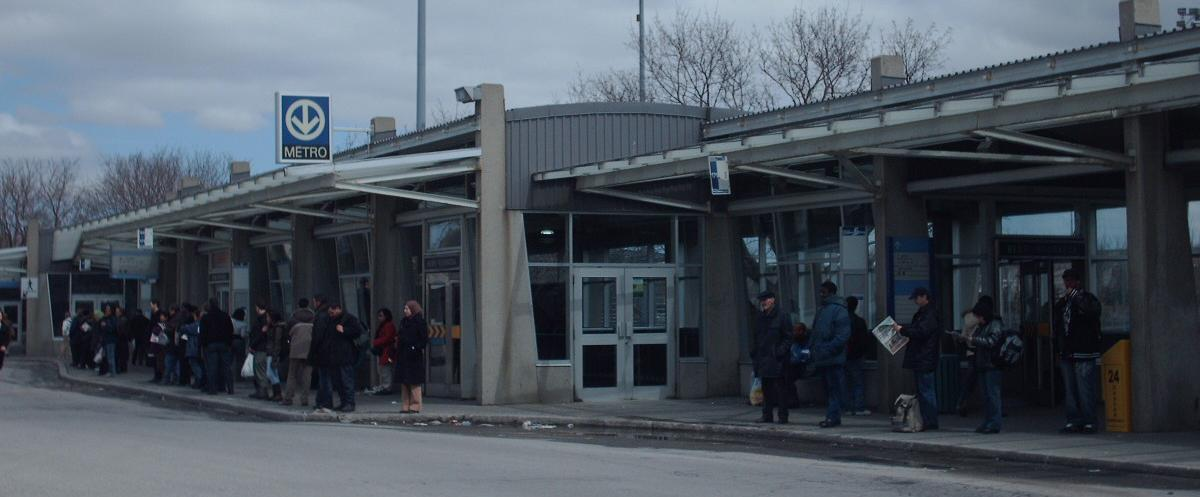
Henri-Bourassa metro station is located on Henri Bourassa Boulevard.

Henri-Bourassa Boulevard (officially in French: Boulevard Henri-Bourassa) is a major east–west street located in Montreal, Quebec, Canada. Located in the north of the island of Montreal, it runs parallel to Gouin Boulevard. Spanning 29 kilometres (18 miles) in length, it links the borough of Rivière-des-Prairies–Pointe-aux-Trembles in the east to a junction with Autoroute 13 and Alfred Nobel Boulevard in Saint-Laurent in the west. West of here, the street continues into the West Island as Hymus Boulevard, a main thoroughfare in Dorval, Pointe-Claire, and Kirkland.

== History ==
The street is renamed after Henri Bourassa (1868–1952), a Quebec nationalist politician, and founder of the Montreal newspaper Le Devoir. It was enlarged in steps beginning in 1954, following expropriations, but also has a new segment.

Part of what became the boulevard — two segments between Meilleur Street and Lajeunesse — was originally named Kelly Street by the Irish farmers who lived alongside it.

Further east, the boulevard was built on what was a private right-of-way owned and operated as a tramway line by the Montreal Park and Island Railway Company, a predecessor of today's Montreal Transit Corporation. Further west, the boulevard was built from Bois Franc Road.

Henri-Bourassa metro station, Du Ruisseau station, Bois-Franc station on the Réseau express métropolitain and Bois-de-Boulogne train station are located on Henri Bourassa Boulevard.
