= Henri-Bourassa station =

Montreal Metro station

Henri-Bourassa
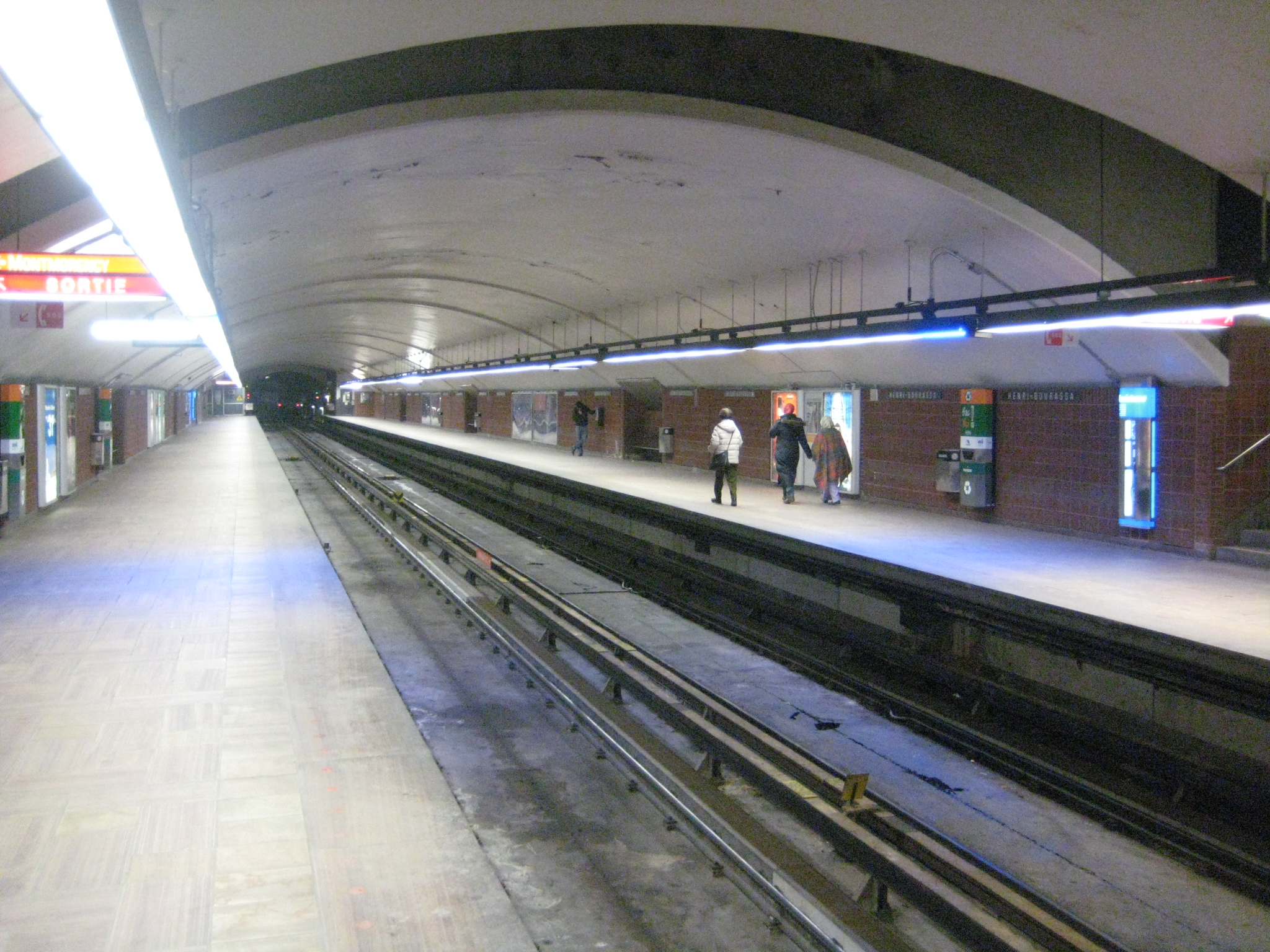

General information
- Location: 575 & 590, boul. Henri-Bourassa Est and 10670 rue Berri; Montreal, Quebec H2C 1E2; Canada
- Coordinates: 45°33′16″N 73°40′07″W
- Operator: Société de transport de Montréal
- Platforms: 1 side platform; 2 inter-connected side platforms
- Tracks: 3
- Connections: Terminus Henri-Bourassa

Construction
- Depth: 18.3 metres (60 feet), 18th deepest
- Accessible: Yes
- Architect: J. Warunkiewicz; André Léonard; Claude Leclerc; Richard Fortin

Other information
- Station code: 280
- Fare zone: ARTM: A

History
- Opened: 14 October 1966 (1st and 2nd platform); 28 April 2007 (3rd platform)

Passengers
- 2024: 4,838,913 ▲5.39%
- Rank: 15 of 68

Services
Preceding station	Montreal Metro	Following station
Sauvé toward Côte-Vertu	Orange Line	Cartier toward Montmorency
Track layout
Location

Henri-Bourassa station is a Montreal Metro station in the borough of Ahuntsic-Cartierville in Montreal, Quebec, Canada. It is operated by the Société de transport de Montréal (STM) and serves the Orange Line. It is located in the Ahuntsic district. The station opened October 14, 1966, as part of the original network of the Metro. It was the eastern terminal of the Orange Line until 2007, when the line expanded to Montmorency station in Laval.

== Overview ==
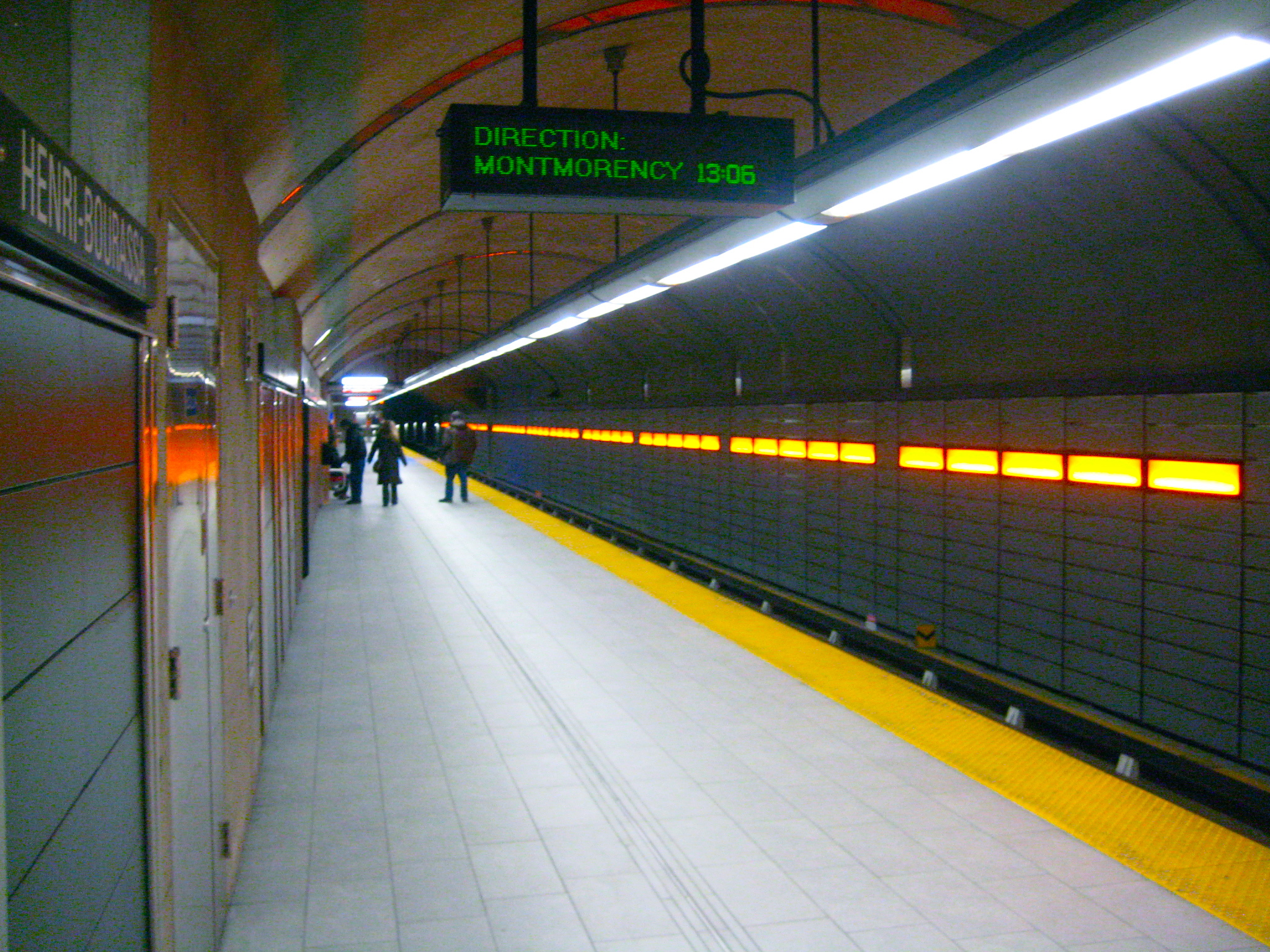
Henri-Bourassa third platform

The original part of the station, designed by Janusz Warunkiewicz, is a normal side platform station, connected by a transept and a long tunnel to a mezzanine some distance away. This in turn gives access to the station's entrance on 575 Henri Bourassa Boulevard, integrated into a government building, the STM's Terminus Henri-Bourassa Sud and the STL's Terminus Henri-Bourassa Nord.

A second access, closer to the station's platforms on Berri Street, was added later. It was designed by André Léonard and Claude Leclerc.

On April 26, 2010, Henri-Bourassa became the 6th station on the network to become accessible, following the installation of elevators.

=== Extension to Laval ===
In the mid 2000s, the station was upgraded as part of the extension to Laval. A diversion from the main tunnel and a third platform have been added. This allows a number of trains to end their run at Henri-Bourassa using the old northbound platform, while others continue to Laval using the new northbound platform. Trains coming from Laval always arrive on the old southbound platform. The extension opened to the public on April 28, 2007.

== Artwork ==
The station includes several artworks. A collective work by 330 Montreal children, titled Les enfants dans la ville ("children in the city"), is found in the mezzanine; composed of moulded concrete blocks, it depicts scenes of parks, houses, play, and transportation. In the Henri-Bourassa Blvd. North entrance, a mural relief by Jacques Huet titled Réveil de la conscience par la solitude ("awakening of consciousness by solitude") forms a firewall between the entrance and the adjacent government office. In the new Berri St. entrance, the architect André Léonard created two terra cotta reliefs titled Le potager ("the vegetable garden") and Le vent ("the wind"). The addition of the Laval platform saw the addition of a new artwork, a light sculpture by Axel Morgenthaler titled .98.

== Origin of the name ==
This station is named for Henri Bourassa Blvd. which in turn is named for Henri Bourassa (1868–1952), a journalist and politician, who served in municipal, provincial, and federal governments, but is best known for founding the newspaper Le Devoir in 1910.

== Connecting bus routes ==
- For all connecting bus routes, see Terminus Henri-Bourassa.

== Nearby points of interest ==
- Aréna Ahuntsic
- Bibliothèque Ahuntsic
- Cégep Bois-de-Boulogne (with buses 164 or 171)
- SAAQ
  (with STM buses 164 or 171)
- Parc Ahuntsic
  - Gary Carter Stadium
- Parc-nature de l'Île de la Visitation (with buses 48, 49 or 69]
- Maison de la culture Ahuntsic/Cartierville
- Ahuntsic Bridge
