= Montreal Metro =

Metro system in Montreal, Quebec

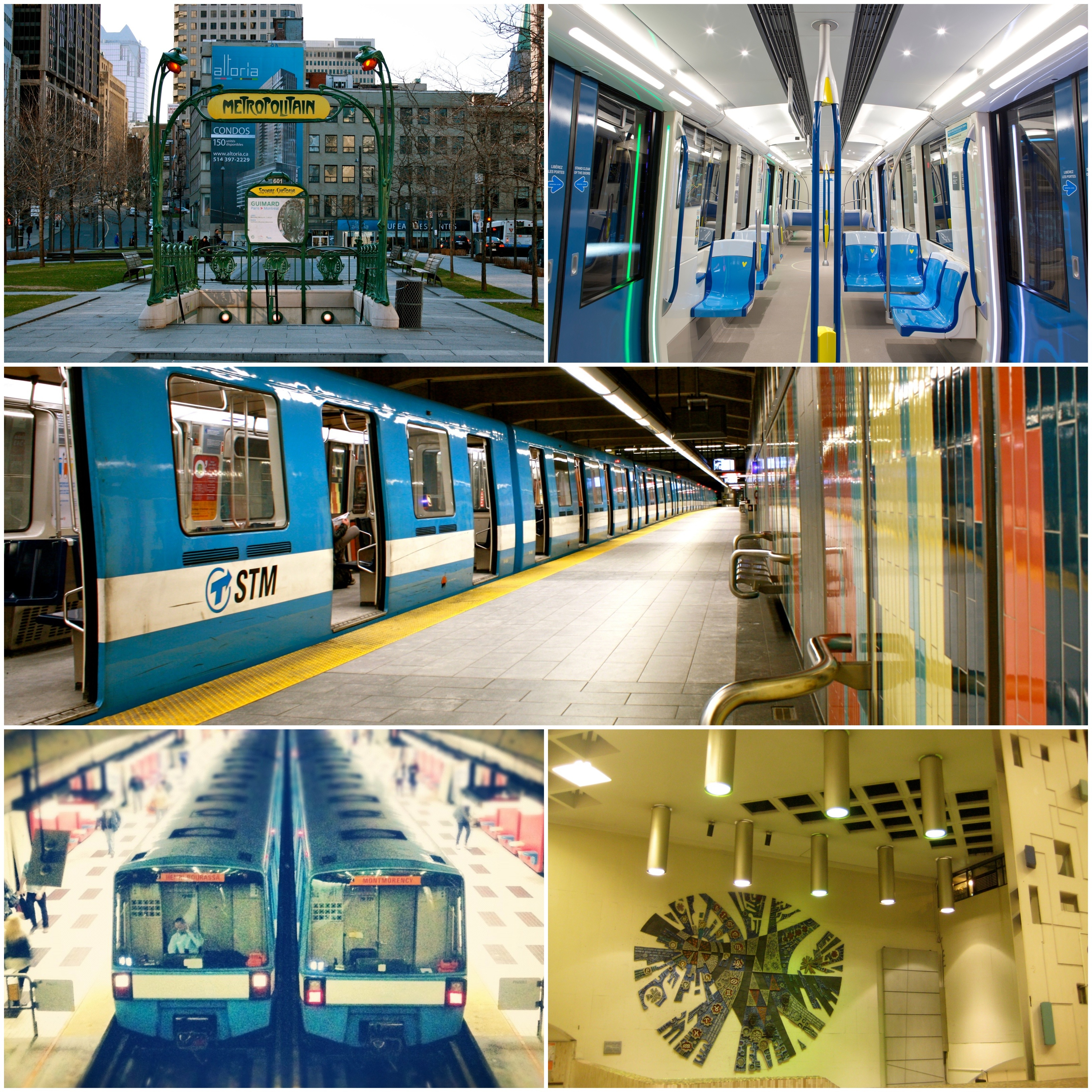
- Left to right, from top: Hector Guimard's Paris Métro entrance at Square-Victoria–OACI; interior of the new MPM-10 ("Azur") trains; MR-73 train at Montmorency station; two MR-73 trains at Plamondon station; ceramic mural at Crémazie station

Overview
- Native name: Métro de Montréal (French)
- Locale: Greater Montreal, Quebec, Canada
- Transit type: Rapid transit
- Number of lines: 4
- Number of stations: 68 (5 under construction)
- Daily ridership: 1,003,800 (weekdays, Q2 2026)
- Annual ridership: 311,929,200 (2025)

Operation
- Began operation: October 14, 1966; 60 years ago
- Operator: Société de transport de Montréal
- Character: Fully underground
- Number of vehicles: 999 (2023)

Technical
- System length: 69.2 km (43.0 mi)
- Track gauge: 1,435 mm (4 ft 8 1/2 in) with running pads for the rubber tired wheels outside of the steel rails
- Electrification: Guide bar, 750 V DC
- Top speed: 72 km/h (45 mph)
System map
Key

The Montreal Metro (French: Métro de Montréal, pronounced [metʁo də mɔ̃ʁeal]) is a rubber-tired underground rapid transit system serving Greater Montreal, Quebec, Canada. The metro, operated by the Société de transport de Montréal (STM), was inaugurated on October 14, 1966, during the tenure of Mayor Jean Drapeau.

Since its opening, with 22 stations on two lines, it has expanded to 68 stations on four lines, totalling 69.2 kilometres (43.0 mi) in length. It serves the north, east and centre of the Island of Montreal, with connections to Longueuil via the Yellow Line (Line 4), and Laval via the Orange Line (Line 2).

The Montreal Metro is Canada's second busiest rapid transit system in terms of daily ridership, delivering an average of 1,003,800 daily unlinked passenger trips per weekday as of the second quarter of 2026. It is North America's fourth busiest rapid transit system, behind the New York City Subway, Mexico City Metro and Toronto subway. In 2025, 311,929,200 trips on the Metro were completed. It is one of two rapid transit systems in Montreal, alongside the Réseau express métropolitain (REM).

== History ==
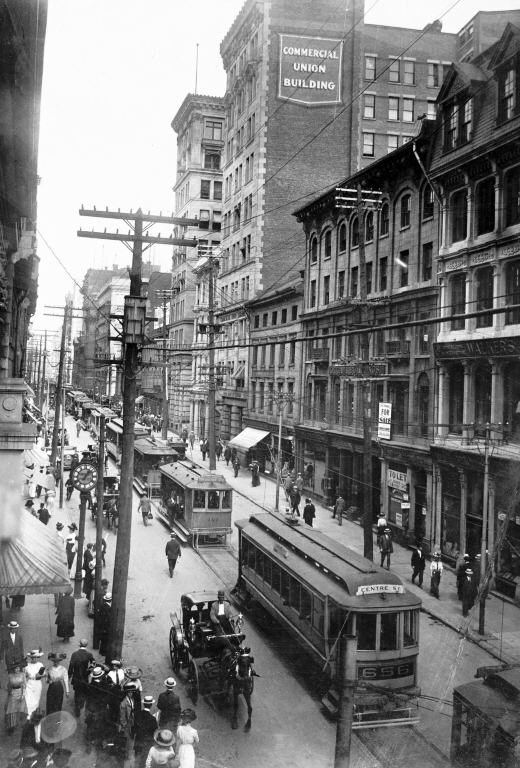
St. James / Saint-Jacques St. streetcars in 1910

Urban transit began in Montreal in 1861 when a line of horse-drawn cars started to operate on Craig (now St-Antoine) and Notre-Dame streets. Eventually, as the city grew, a comprehensive network of streetcar lines provided service in most of the city. But urban congestion started to take its toll on streetcar punctuality, so the idea of an underground system was soon considered.

=== Fifty years of projects ===
In 1902, as European and American cities were inaugurating their first subway systems, the Canadian federal government created the Montreal Subway Company to promote the idea in Canada.

Starting in 1910, many proposals were tabled but the Montreal Metro would prove to be an elusive goal. The Montreal Street Railway Company, the Montreal Central Terminal Company and the Montreal Underground and Elevated Railway Company all undertook fruitless negotiations with the city. A year later, the Comptoir Financier Franco-Canadien and the Montreal Tunnel Company proposed tunnels under the city centre and the Saint-Lawrence River to link the emerging South Shore neighbourhoods but faced the opposition of railway companies. The Montreal Tramways Company (MTC) was the first to receive the approval of the provincial government in 1913 and four years to start construction. The reluctance of elected city officials to advance funds foiled this first attempt.

The issue of a subway remained present in the newspapers but World War I and the following recession prevented any execution. The gradual return to financial health during the 1920s brought the MTC project back and attracted support from the premier of Quebec. This new attempt was stalled by the Great Depression, which saw the city's streetcar ridership atrophy. A subway proposal was next made by Mayor Camillien Houde in 1939 as a way to provide work for the jobless masses.

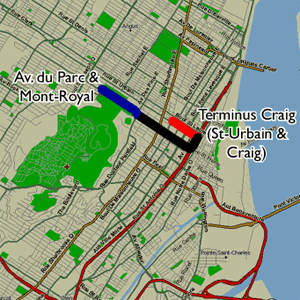
1910 project under Park Avenue

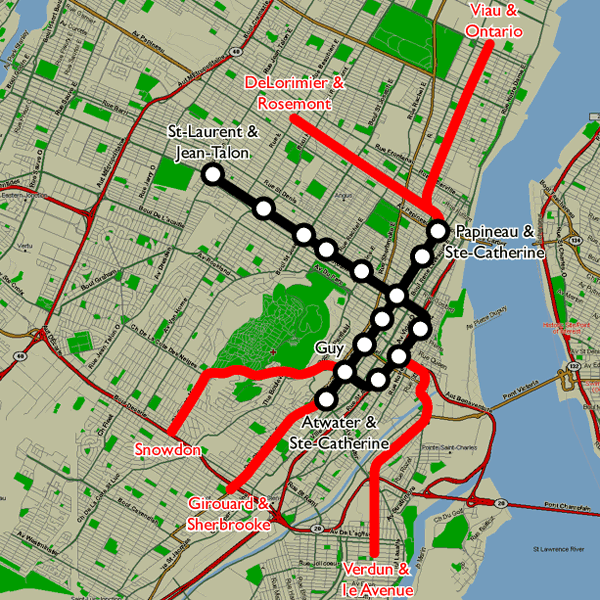
1944 project

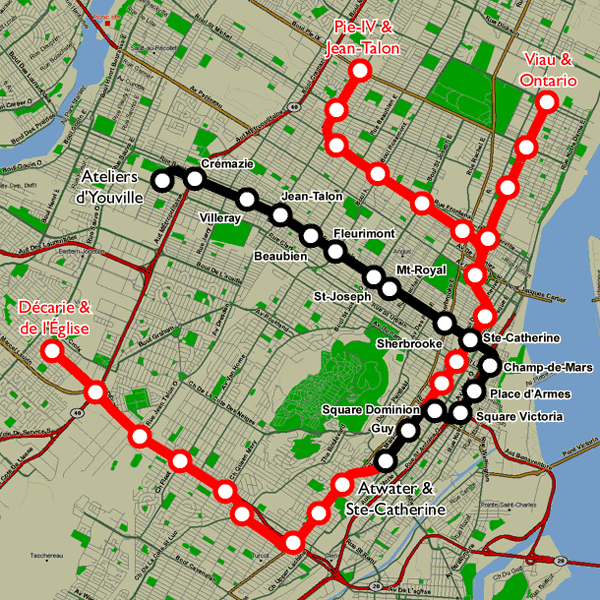
1953 project

World War II and the war effort in Montreal resurrected the idea of a metro. In 1944, the MTC proposed a two-line network, with one line running underneath Saint Catherine Street and the other under Saint Denis, Notre-Dame and Saint Jacques Streets. In 1951, the newly formed public Montreal Transportation Commission bought out the Montreal Tramways Company and started replacing streetcars with buses. The commission also proposed a single subway line reusing the 1944 plans and extending it all the way to Boulevard Crémazie, right by the D'Youville maintenance shops. By this point, construction was already well underway on Canada's first subway line in Toronto under Yonge Street, which would open in 1954. Still, Montreal councillors remained cautious and no work was initiated. For some of them, including Jean Drapeau during his first municipal term, public transit was a thing of the past.

In 1959, a private company, the Société d'expansion métropolitaine, offered to build a rubber-tired metro but the Transportation Commission wanted its own network and rejected the offer. This would be the last missed opportunity, for the re-election of Jean Drapeau as mayor and the arrival of his right-hand man, Lucien Saulnier, would prove decisive. In the early 1960s, the Western world experienced an economic boom and Quebec underwent its Quiet Revolution. From August 1, 1960, many municipal services reviewed the project and on November 3, 1961, the Montreal City Council voted appropriations amounting to $132 million ($1.06 billion in 2016) to construct and equip an initial network 16 kilometres (9.9 mi) in length.

=== Construction ===
The 1961 plan reused several previous studies and planned three lines carved into the rock under the city centre to the most populated areas of the city. The City of Montreal (and its chief engineer Lucien L'Allier) were assisted in the detailed design and engineering of the Metro by French consultant SOFRETU, owned by the operator of the Paris Métro. The French influence is clearly seen in the station design and rolling stock of the Metro. Rubber tires were chosen instead of steel ones, following the Parisian influence – as the rubber tired trains could use steeper grades and accelerate faster. 80% of the tunnels were built through rock, as opposed to the traditional cut-and-cover method used for the construction of the Yonge Subway in Toronto.

=== The first two lines ===
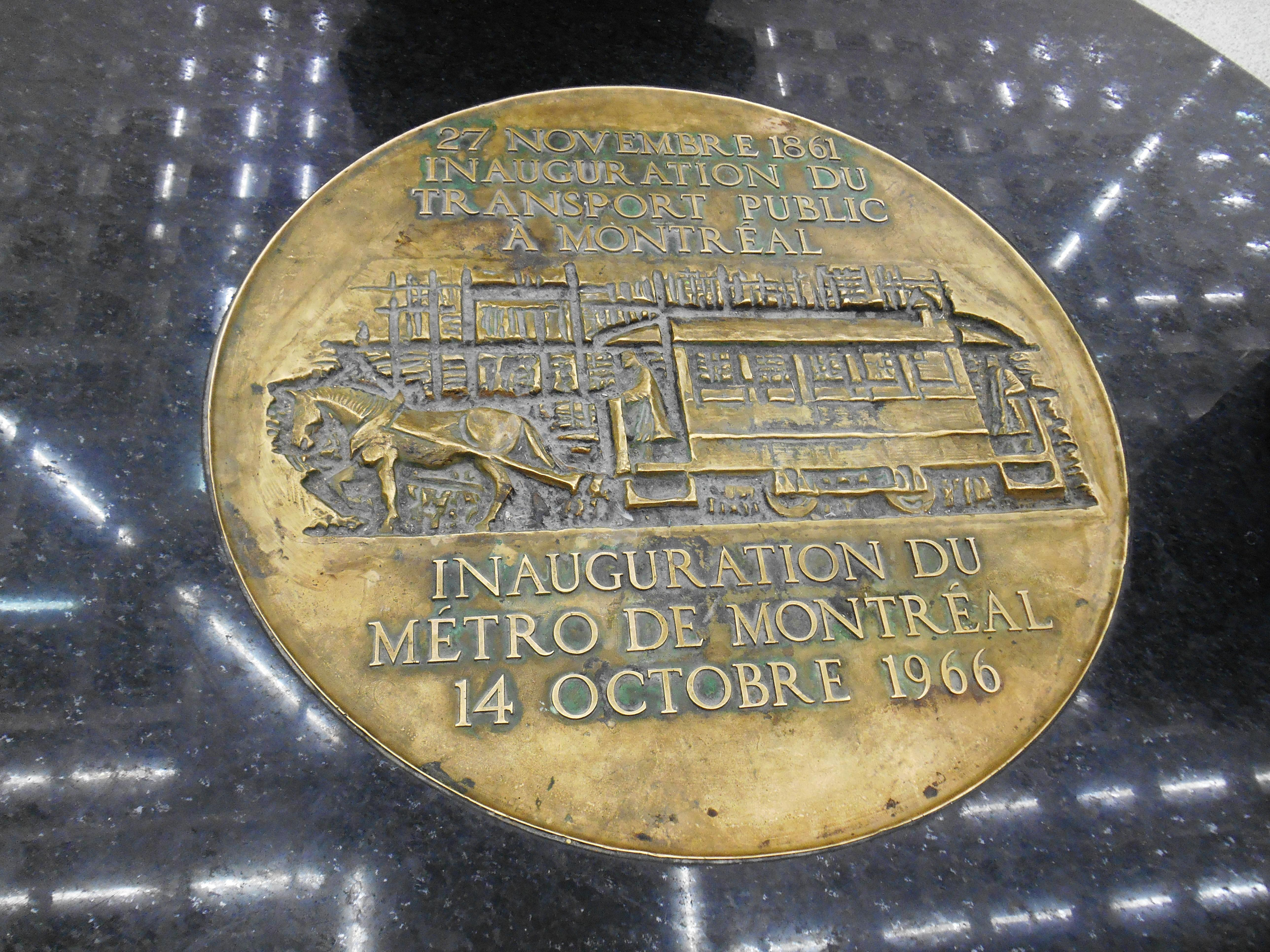
Berri–UQAM station tablet

The main line, the Green Line or Line 1, was to pass between the two most important arteries, Saint Catherine and Sherbrooke streets, more or less under the De Maisonneuve Boulevard. It would extend between the English-speaking west at Atwater station and French-speaking east at Frontenac. The Orange Line (Line 2) was to run from north of the downtown, from Crémazie station through various residential neighbourhoods to the business district at Place-d'Armes station.

Construction of the first two lines began May 23, 1962, under the supervision of the Director of Public Works, Lucien L'Allier. On June 11, 1963, the construction costs for tunnels being lower than expected, the Orange Line was extended by two stations at each end and the new termini became the Henri-Bourassa and Bonaventure stations. The project, which employed more than 5,000 workers at its height, and cost the lives of 12 of them, ended on October 14, 1966. The service was opened gradually between October 1966 and April 1967 as the stations were completed.

==== Cancellation of the Red Line ====
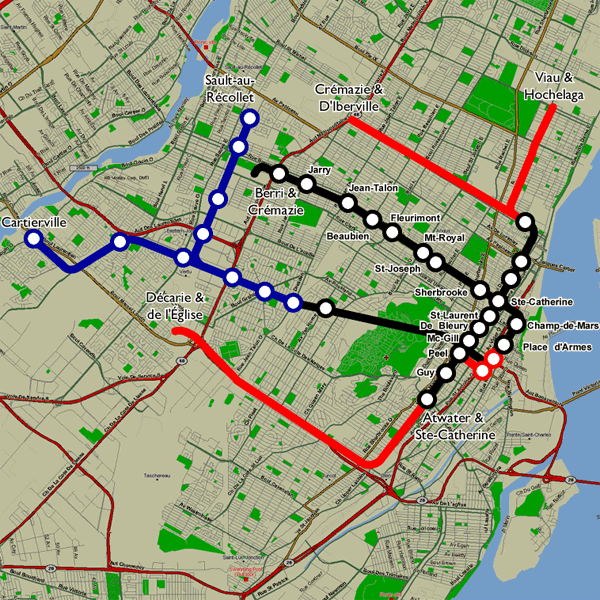
1961 project, showing the third line

A third line was planned. It was to use Canadian National Railway (CN) tracks passing under the Mount Royal to reach the northwest suburb of Cartierville from the city centre. Unlike the previous two lines, trains were to be partly running above ground. Negotiations with the CN and municipalities were stalling as Montreal was chosen in November 1962 to hold the 1967 Universal Exposition (Expo 67). Having to make a choice, the city decided that a Yellow Line (Line 4) linking Montreal to the South Shore suburbs following a plan similar to those proposed early in the 20th century was more necessary.

The Red Line (Line 3) was never built and the number was never used again. The railway, already used for a commuter train to the North Shore at Deux-Montagnes, was completely renovated in the early 1990s and effectively replaced the planned third line. The next line would thus be numbered 5 (Blue Line). Subsequently, elements of the line, particularly the Deux-Montagnes commuter train, became the first line of the Réseau Express Métropolitain.

==== Expo 67 ====
The Montreal municipal administration asked municipalities of the South Shore of the Saint Lawrence River which would be interested in the Metro and Longueuil received the rail link. The Yellow Line (Line 4) would therefore pass under the river, from Berri-de-Montigny station, junction of the Green Line and the Orange Line, to Longueuil. A stop was added in between to access the site of Expo 67, built on two islands of the Hochelaga Archipelago in the river. Saint Helen's Island, on which the station of the same name was built, was massively enlarged and consolidated with several nearby islands (including Ronde Island) using backfill excavated during the construction of the Metro. Notre Dame Island, adjacent, was created from scratch with the same material. The Yellow Line was completed on April 1, 1967, in time for the opening of the World's Fair.

The first Metro network was completed with the public opening of the Yellow Line on April 28, 1967. The cities of Montreal, Longueuil and Westmount had assumed the entire cost of construction and equipment of $213.7 million ($1.6 billion in 2016). Montreal became the seventh city in North America to operate a subway. The 1960s being very optimistic years, Metro planning did not escape the general exuberance of the time, and a 1967 study, "Horizon 2000", imagined a network of 160 kilometres (99 mi) of tunnels for the year 2000.

=== Extensions and unbuilt lines ===
Network evolution, 1966–2007

In 1970, the Montreal Urban Community (MUC) was created. This group was made of municipalities that occupy the Island of Montreal and the city of Montreal was the biggest participant. MUC's mission was to provide standardized services at a regional level, one of them being transportation. The MUC Transportation Commission was thus created at the same time to serve as prime contractor for the Metro extensions. It merged all island transport companies and became the Société de transport de la communauté urbaine de Montréal (STCUM) in 1985 and then the Société de transport de Montréal (STM) in 2002.

==== Montreal Olympics ====
The success of the Metro increased the pressure to extend the network to other populated areas, including the suburbs on the Island of Montreal. After being awarded, in May 1970, the 1976 Summer Olympics, a loan of $430 million ($2.7 billion in 2016) was approved by the MUC on February 12, 1971, to fund the extensions of the Green Line and the Orange Line and the construction of a transverse line: the Blue Line (Line 5). The Government of Quebec agreed to bear 60% of the costs.

The work on the extensions started October 14, 1971, with the Green Line towards the east to reach the site where the Olympic Stadium was to be built and Autoroute 25 (Honoré-Beaugrand station) that could serve as a transfer point for visitors arriving from outside. The extensions were an opportunity to make improvements to the network, such as new trains, larger stations and even semi-automatic control. The first extension was completed in June 1976 just before the Olympics. The Green Line was later extended to the southwest to reach the suburbs of Verdun and LaSalle with the Angrignon as the terminus station, named after the park and zoo. This segment opened at September 1978.

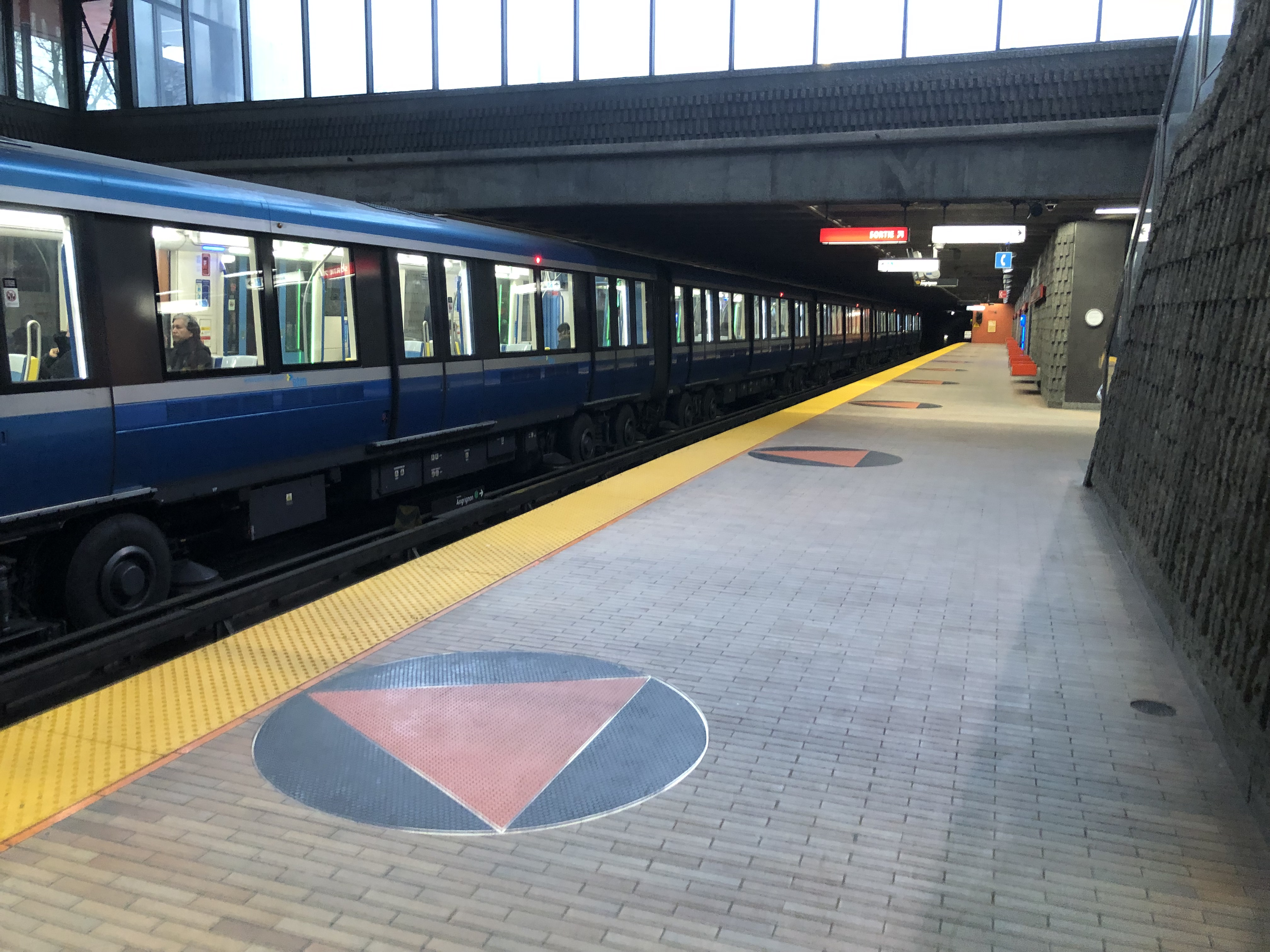
Jolicoeur station on the Green Line (Line 1)

In the process, further extensions were planned and in 1975 spending was expected to reach reached $1.6 billion ($7.3 billion in 2016). Faced with these soaring costs, the Government of Quebec declared a moratorium May 19, 1976, to the all-out expansion desired by Mayor Jean Drapeau. Tenders were frozen, including those of the Orange Line after Snowdon station and those of the Blue Line, whose works were not yet already underway. A struggle then ensued between the MUC and the Government of Quebec as any extension could not be done without the agreement of both parties. The Montreal Transportation Office might have tried to put the government in front of a fait accompli by awarding large contracts to build the tunnel between Namur station and the Bois-Franc station just before the moratorium was in force.

==== Moratorium on expansion ====
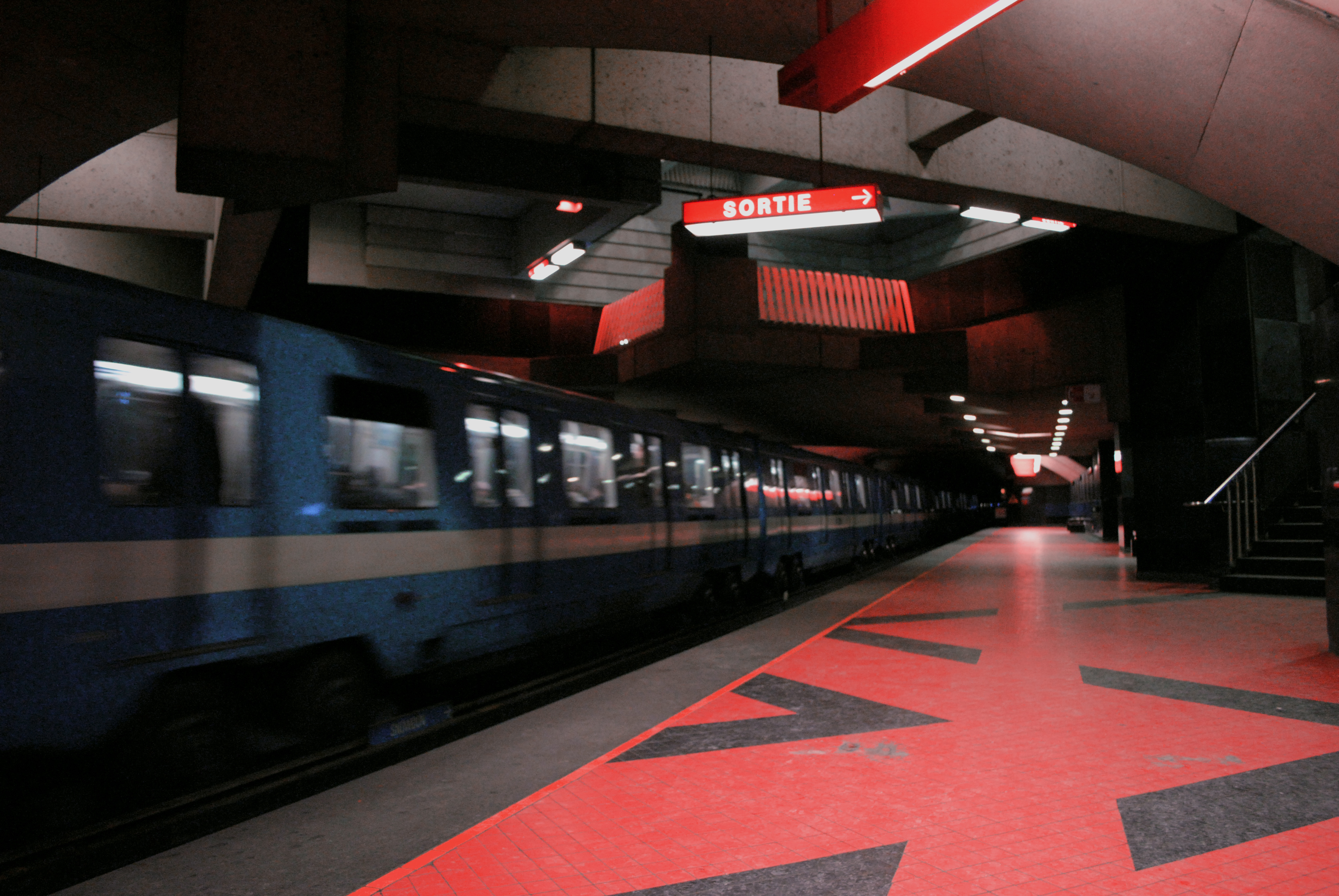
Acadie station on the Blue Line (Line 5)

In 1977, the newly elected government partially lifted the moratorium on the extension of the Orange line and the construction of the Blue Line. In 1978, the STCUM proposed a map which included a western extension of the Blue Line, with stations in Notre-Dame-de-Grâce, Montreal West, Ville St. Pierre, Lachine, LaSalle, and potentially beyond.

The Orange Line was gradually extended westward to Place-Saint-Henri station in 1980 and to Snowdon station in 1981. As the stations were completed, the service was extended. In December 1979 Quebec presented its "integrated transport plan" in which the Orange Line was to be tunnelled to Du Collège station and the Blue Line from Snowdon station to Anjou station. The plan proposed no other underground lines as the government preferred the option of converting existing railway lines to overground Metro ones. The mayors of the MUC, initially reluctant, accepted this plan when Quebec promised in February 1981 to finance future extensions fully. The moratorium was then modestly lifted on the Orange Line that reached Du Collège station in 1984 and finally Côte-Vertu station in 1986. This line took the shape of an "U" linking the north of the island to the city centre and serving two very populous axes.

The various moratoriums and technical difficulties encountered during the construction of the fourth line stretched the project over fourteen years. The Blue Line, which runs through the centre of the island of Montreal, crossed the east branch of the Orange Line at the Jean-Talon station in 1986 and its west branch at the Snowdon station in 1988. Because it was not crowded, the STCUM at first operated the Blue Line weekdays only from 5:30 am to 7:30 pm and was circulating only three-car trains instead of the nine car trains in use along the other lines. Students from the University of Montreal, the main source of customers, obtained extension of the closing time to 11:10 pm and then 0:15 am in 2002.

==== Recession and unfinished projects ====
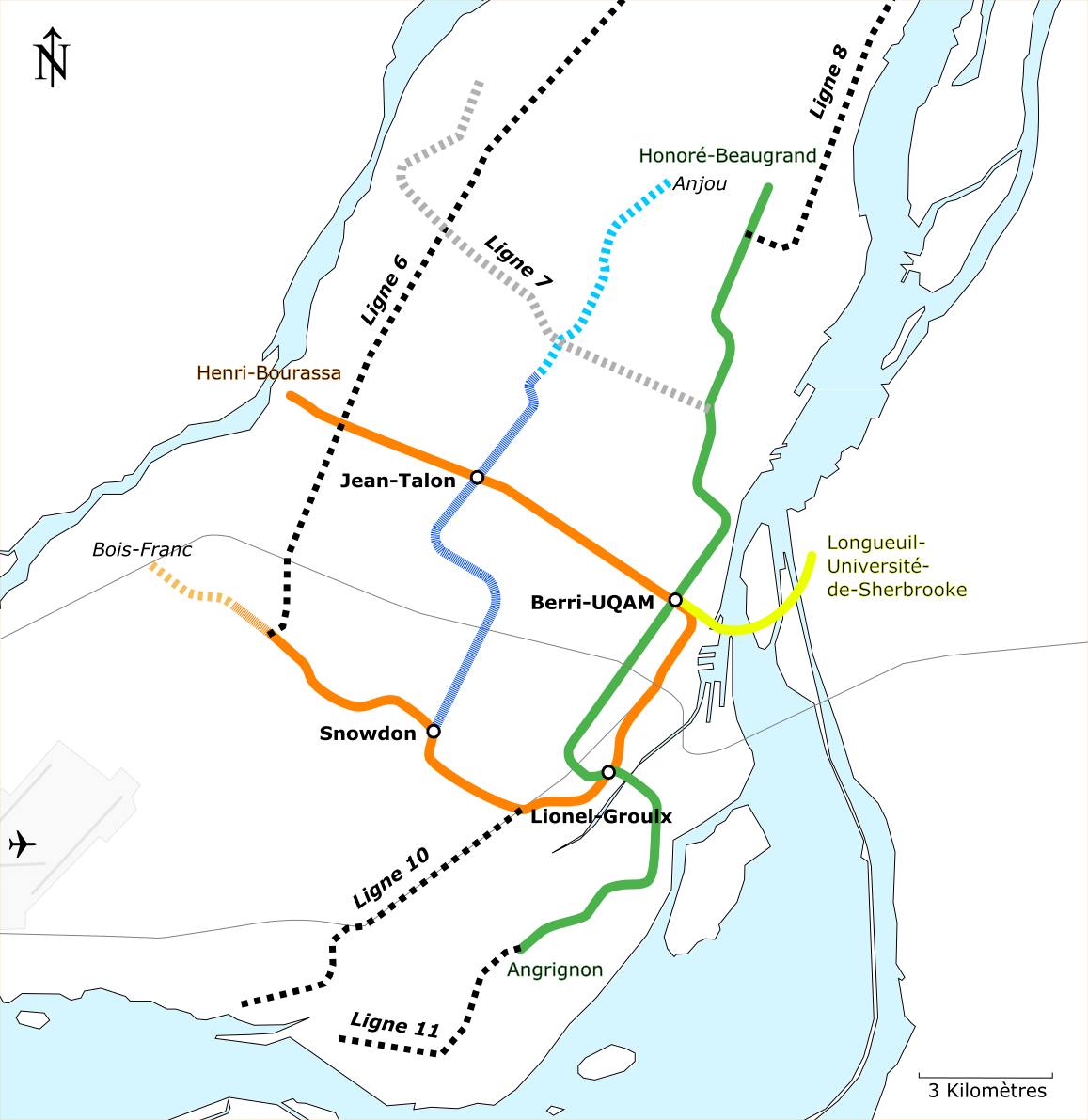
Metro lines and MUC proposed expansions in 1984

In the late 1980s, the original network length had nearly quadrupled in twenty years and exceeded that of Toronto, but the plans did not stop there. In its 1983–1984 scenario, the MUC planned a new underground line, the White Line (Line 7) (Pie-IX station to Montréal-Nord) and several surface lines numbered Line 6 (Du College station to Repentigny), Line 8 (Radisson station to Pointe-aux-Trembles), Line 10 (Vendome station to Lachine) and Line 11 (Angrignon terminus to LaSalle). In 1985, a new government in Quebec rejected the project, replacing the Metro lines by commuter train lines in its own 1988 transport plan. Yet the provincial elections of 1989 approaching, the White Line project reappeared and the extensions of the Blue Line to Anjou (Pie-IX, Viau, Lacordaire, Langelier and Galeries d'Anjou) and the Orange Line northward (Deguire/Poirier, Bois-Franc and Salaberry) were announced.

At the beginning of the 1990s, there was a significant deficit in public finances across Canada, especially in Quebec, and an economic recession. Metro ridership decreased and the Government of Quebec removed subsidies for the operation of urban public transport. Faced with this situation, the extensions projects were put on hold and the MUC prioritized the renovation of its infrastructures.

==== Chronology ====
Date	Line	Section	Stations
October 14, 1966	Green Line (Montreal Metro)	Atwater - Papineau	8
October 14, 1966	Orange Line (Montreal Metro)	Place-d'Armes - Henri-Bourassa	12
December 19, 1966	Green Line (Montreal Metro)	Papineau - Frontenac	1
December 21, 1966	Green Line (Montreal Metro)	New station Beaudry	1
February 6, 1967	Orange Line (Montreal Metro)	Place-d'Armes - Square-Victoria–OACI	1
February 13, 1967	Orange Line (Montreal Metro)	Square-Victoria–OACI - Bonaventure	1
March 31, 1967	Green Line (Montreal Metro)	Berri-UQAM – Longueuil–Université-de-Sherbrooke	1
April 28, 1967	Yellow Line (Montreal Metro)	New station Jean-Drapeau	1
June 6, 1976	Green Line (Montreal Metro)	Frontenac - Honoré-Beaugrand	9
September 3, 1978	Green Line (Montreal Metro)	Atwater - Angrignon	8
April 28, 1980	Orange Line (Montreal Metro)	Bonaventure - Place-Saint-Henri	3
September 7, 1981	Orange Line (Montreal Metro)	Place-Saint-Henri - Snowdon	3
January 4, 1982	Orange Line (Montreal Metro)	Snowdon - Côte-Sainte-Catherine	1
June 29, 1982	Orange Line (Montreal Metro)	Côte-Sainte-Catherine - Plamondon	1
January 9, 1984	Orange Line (Montreal Metro)	Plamondon - Du Collège	3
June 16, 1986	Blue Line (Montreal Metro)	De Castelnau - Saint-Michel	4
October 27, 1986	Orange Line (Montreal Metro)	Du Collège - Côte-Vertu	1
June 15, 1987	Blue Line (Montreal Metro)	De Castelnau - Parc	1
January 4, 1988	Blue Line (Montreal Metro)	Parc - Snowdon	4
March 28, 1988	Blue Line (Montreal Metro)	New station Acadie	1
April 27, 2007	Orange Line (Montreal Metro)	Henri-Bourassa - Montmorency	3

=== Creation of AMT, RTM, ARTM, and improvements ===
In 1996, the Government of Quebec created a supra-municipal agency, the Agence métropolitaine de transport (AMT), whose mandate is to coordinate the development of transport throughout the Greater Montreal area. The AMT was responsible, among others, for the development of the Metro and suburban trains.

On June 1, 2017, the AMT was disbanded and replaced by two distinct agencies by the Loi 76 (English: Law 76), the Autorité régionale de transport métropolitain (ARTM), mandated to manage and integrate road transport and public transportation in Greater Montreal; and the Réseau de transport métropolitain (RTM, publicly known as exo), which took over all operations from the former Agence métropolitaine de transport. RTM now operates Montreal's commuter rail and metropolitan bus services, and is the second busiest such system in Canada after Toronto's GO Transit.

==== Laval extension ====
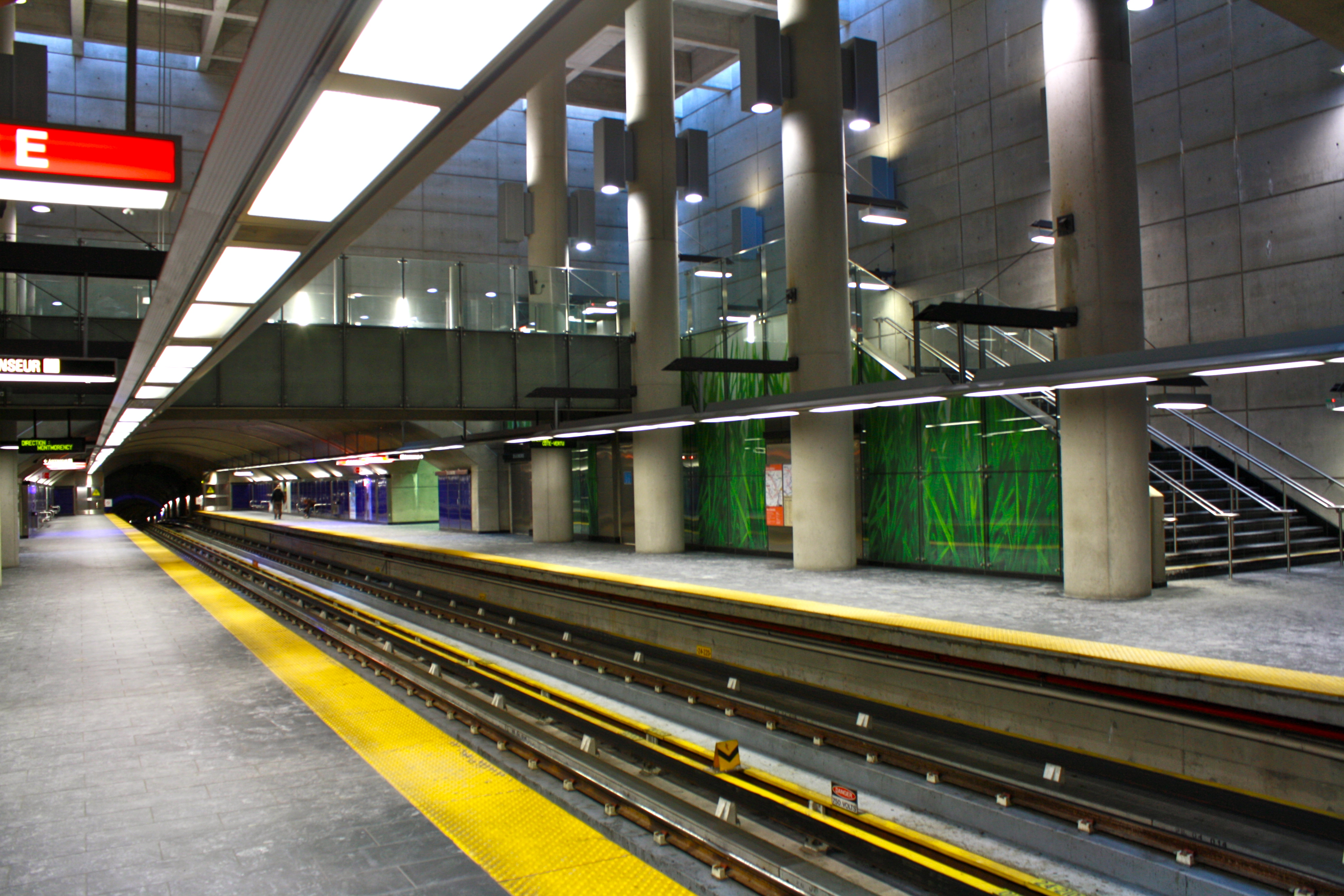
De la Concorde station in Laval

Announced in 1998 by the STCUM, the project to extend the Orange Line past the Henri-Bourassa terminus to the city of Laval, passing under the Rivière des Prairies, was launched March 18, 2002. The extension was decided and funded by the Government of Quebec. The AMT received the mandate of its implementation but the ownership and operation of the line stayed with the Société de transport de Montréal (STCUM successor). The work completed, opening to the public happened April 28, 2007. This extension added 5.2 kilometres (3.2 mi) to the network and three stations in Laval (Cartier, De la Concorde and Montmorency). As of 2009, ridership increased by 60,000 a day with these new stations.

==== Major renovations ====
Since 2004, most of the STM's investments have been directed to rolling stock and infrastructure renovation programs. New trains (MPM-10) have been delivered, replacing the older MR-63 trains. Tunnels are being repaired and several stations, including Berri–UQAM, have been several years in rehabilitation. In 2016, many electrical and ventilation structures on the surface were completely rebuilt to modern standards. In 2020, work to install cellular coverage in the Metro was completed. Station accessibility has also been improved, with over 30 of the 68 stations having elevators installed since 2007.

List of stations with elevators
Green Line (Montreal Metro)	Orange Line (Montreal Metro)	Yellow Line (Montreal Metro)	Blue Line (Montreal Metro)	In progress
Honoré-Beaugrand, Viau, Pie-IX, Préfontaine, Berri-UQAM, Place-des-Arts, McGill, Atwater, Lionel-Groulx, Jolicoeur, Angrignon	Montmorency, De la Concorde, Cartier, Henri-Bourassa, Jean-Talon, Rosemont, Mont-Royal, Berri-UQAM, Champ-de-Mars, Place-D'Armes, Bonaventure, Lionel-Groulx, Place-Saint-Henri, Vendôme, Villa-Maria, Snowdon, Du Collège, Côte-Vertu	Jean-Drapeau	Snowdon, , Édouard-Montpetit, Outremont, Jean-Talon, D'Iberville	Berri-UQAM

==== Réseau express métropolitain ====
In August 2023, the first phase of the Réseau express métropolitain (REM) opened between Gare Centrale (Bonaventure) and Brossard. The system is independent of, but connects to and hence complements the Metro. Built by CDPQ Infra, part of the Quebec pension fund Caisse de dépôt et placement du Québec. In November 2025, the second phase of the REM opened between Deux-Montagnes and Gare Centrale. The opening of the new branch introduced 2 new interchanges at Metro stations McGill and Édouard-Montpetit with an Exo interchange at the Côte-de-Liesse station that opened two months after the original opening date in January 2026. The Anse-à-l'Orme Branch (A3) was inaugurated on May 18, 2026 and the YUL-Aéroport-Montréal-Trudeau branch (A2), still has its opening date planned for 2027.

=== Future growth ===
==== Blue Line extension to Anjou ====
Following the opening of the Blue Line in the 1980s, various governments have proposed extending the line east to Anjou. In 2013, a proposal to extend the line to Anjou was announced by the STM and the Quebec government. On April 9, 2018, premier of Quebec Philippe Couillard and Prime Minister Justin Trudeau announced their commitment to fund and complete the extension, then planned to open in 2026. In March 2022, it was announced that the federal government had agreed to provide $1.3 billion to the extension, with further costs to be covered by the provincial government. The 6-kilometre (3.7 mi) extension will include five new stations, two bus terminals, a pedestrian tunnel connecting to the Pie-IX BRT and a new park-and-ride. Overall, the project is estimated to cost around $5.8 to $6.4 billion and is scheduled to be completed in 2030. Initial construction work began in August 2022.

==== Pink Line ====
In 2017, Valérie Plante proposed the Pink Line as part of her campaign for the office of Mayor of Montreal. The new route would have 29 stations and would connect downtown with the northeastern parts of Montreal, as well as the western end of Notre-Dame-de-Grâce and Lachine. The project has since been added to Quebec's 10-year infrastructure plan, and feasibility studies for the line's western section began in June 2021.

== Network ==
The Montreal Metro consists of four lines, which are usually identified by their colour or terminus station. The terminus station in the direction of travel is used to differentiate between directions.

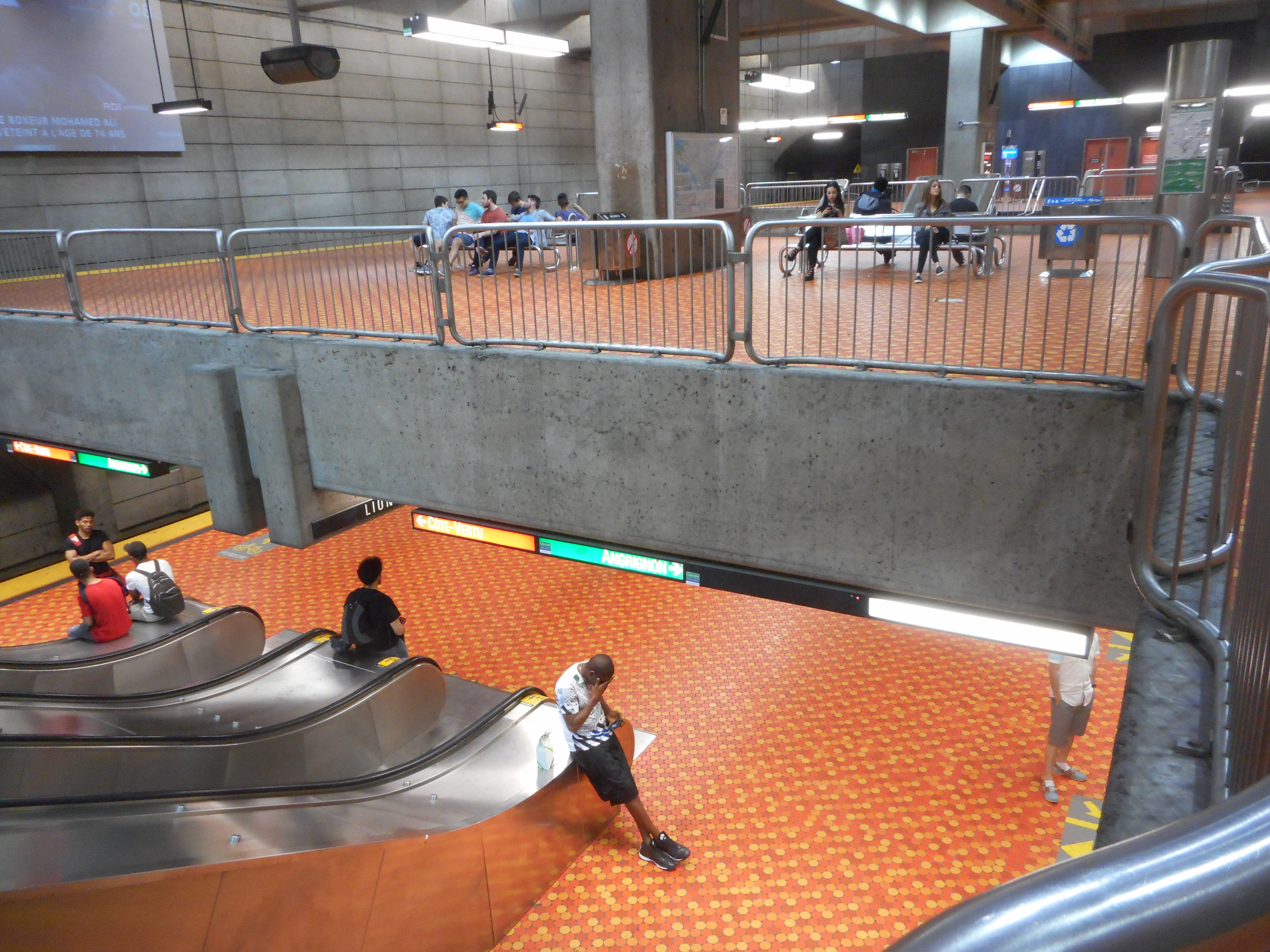
Lionel-Groulx Metro station, connecting the Green and Orange Lines

=== Lines and operation ===
The Yellow Line is the shortest line, with three stations, built for Expo 67. Metro lines that leave the Île de Montréal are the Orange Line, which continues to Laval, and the Yellow Line, which continues to Longueuil.

Metro service starts at 05:30, and the last trains start their run between 00:30 and 01:00 on weekdays and Sunday, and between 01:00 and 01:30 on Saturday. During rush hour, there are two to four minutes between trains on the Orange and Green Lines. The frequency decreases to 12 minutes during late nights.

Line #	Colour	From	To	Year first opened	Year last extended	Length	Stations	Service interval (minutes)		
Line #	Colour	From	To	Year first opened	Year last extended	Length	Stations	Rush hour	Off-peak	Weekend
Green Line (Montreal Metro)	Green	Angrignon	Honoré-Beaugrand	1966	1978	22.1 km (13.7 mi)	27	3–4	4–10	6–12
Orange Line (Montreal Metro)	Orange	Côte-Vertu	Montmorency	1966	2007	30.0 km (18.6 mi)	31	2–4	4–10	6–12
Yellow Line (Montreal Metro)	Yellow	Berri–UQAM	Longueuil–Université-de-Sherbrooke	1967	1967	3.82 km (2.37 mi)	3	3–5	5–10	5–10
Blue Line (Montreal Metro)	Blue	Snowdon	Saint-Michel	1986	1988	9.53 km (5.92 mi)	12	3–5	5–10	8–11

=== Fares ===
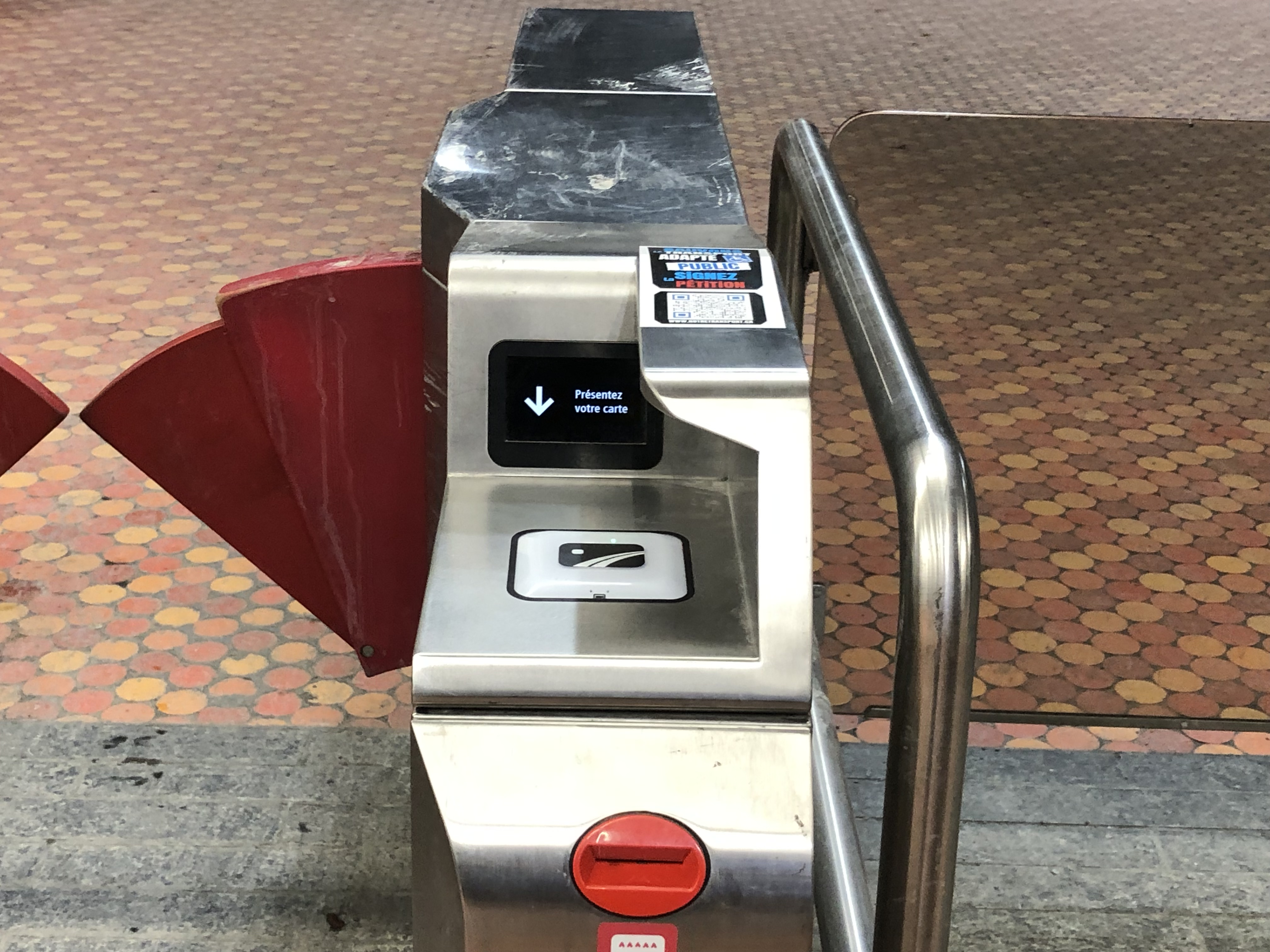
New Opus card and magnetic ticket reader turnstile gate at Lionel-Groulx station

The Société de transport de Montréal (STM) operates Metro and bus services in Montreal, and transfers between the two are free inside a 120-minute time frame after the first validation.

On July 1, 2022, the ARTM reorganized its fare system into 4 zones: A, B, C, and D. The island of Montreal was placed in zone A and fares for zones B, C and D can be bought separately or together. The Metro fares are fully integrated with the Exo commuter rail system, which links the metropolitan area to the outer suburbs via six interchange stations (Bonaventure, Lucien-L'Allier, Vendôme, De la Concorde, Sauvé, and Parc) and the Réseau express métropolitain (REM), which opened in August 2023. The fares for Exo, the REM and the Metro for zone A are only valid on the island of Montreal. In order to take the Exo, REM or Metro trains from Montreal to Laval or Longueuil (zone B), travelers must have the corresponding fares for that zone; for example, an all modes AB fare.

Fare payment is via a barrier system accepting magnetic tickets and RFID-like contactless cards. A rechargeable contactless smart card called Opus was unveiled on April 21, 2008; it provides seamless integration with other transit networks of neighbouring cities by being capable of holding multiple transport tickets: tickets, books or subscriptions, a subscription for Montreal only and commuter train tickets. Moreover, unlike the magnetic stripe cards, which had been sold alongside the new Opus cards up until May 2009, the contactless cards are not at risk of becoming demagnetized and rendered useless and do not require patrons to slide them through a reader.

From 2015 onwards, customers were able to purchase an Opus card reader to recharge their personal card online from a computer, through Opus en ligne ("Opus Online"). In 2016, the STM began internal testing for NFC-based mobile payments on smartphone as an alternative to physical Opus cards. In April 2024, the ARTM added an option to recharge an Opus card directly from its Chrono mobile app, and discontinued Opus en ligne on 30 June. In late 2025, the ARTM launched a closed beta option to use virtual fares directly in the Chrono app for select users, with the feature rolled out gradually as a public beta for Android users in July 2026. Rollout to all platforms is expected by the end of 2026.

=== MétroVision ===
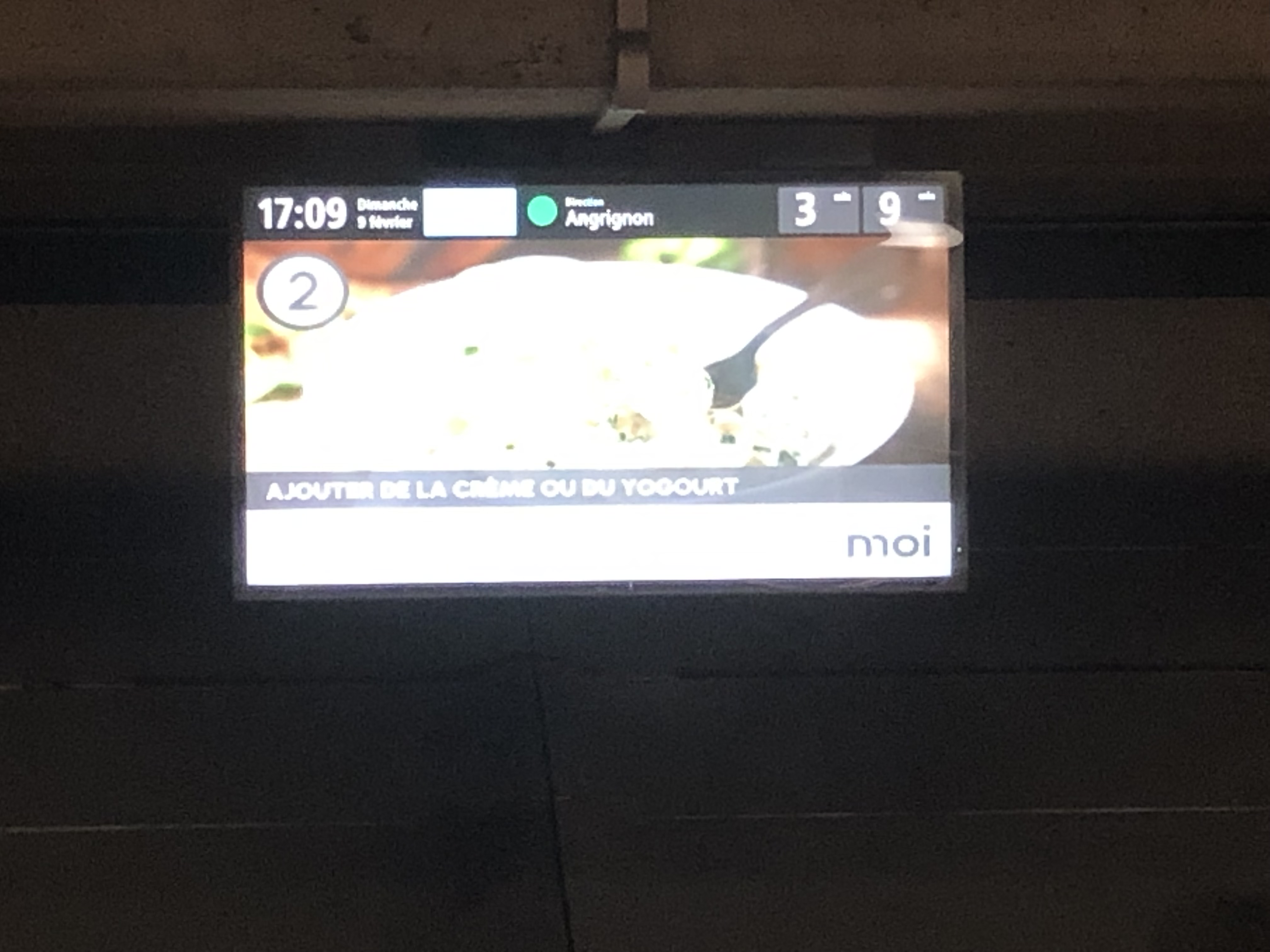
A MétroVision screen at Lionel-Groulx station

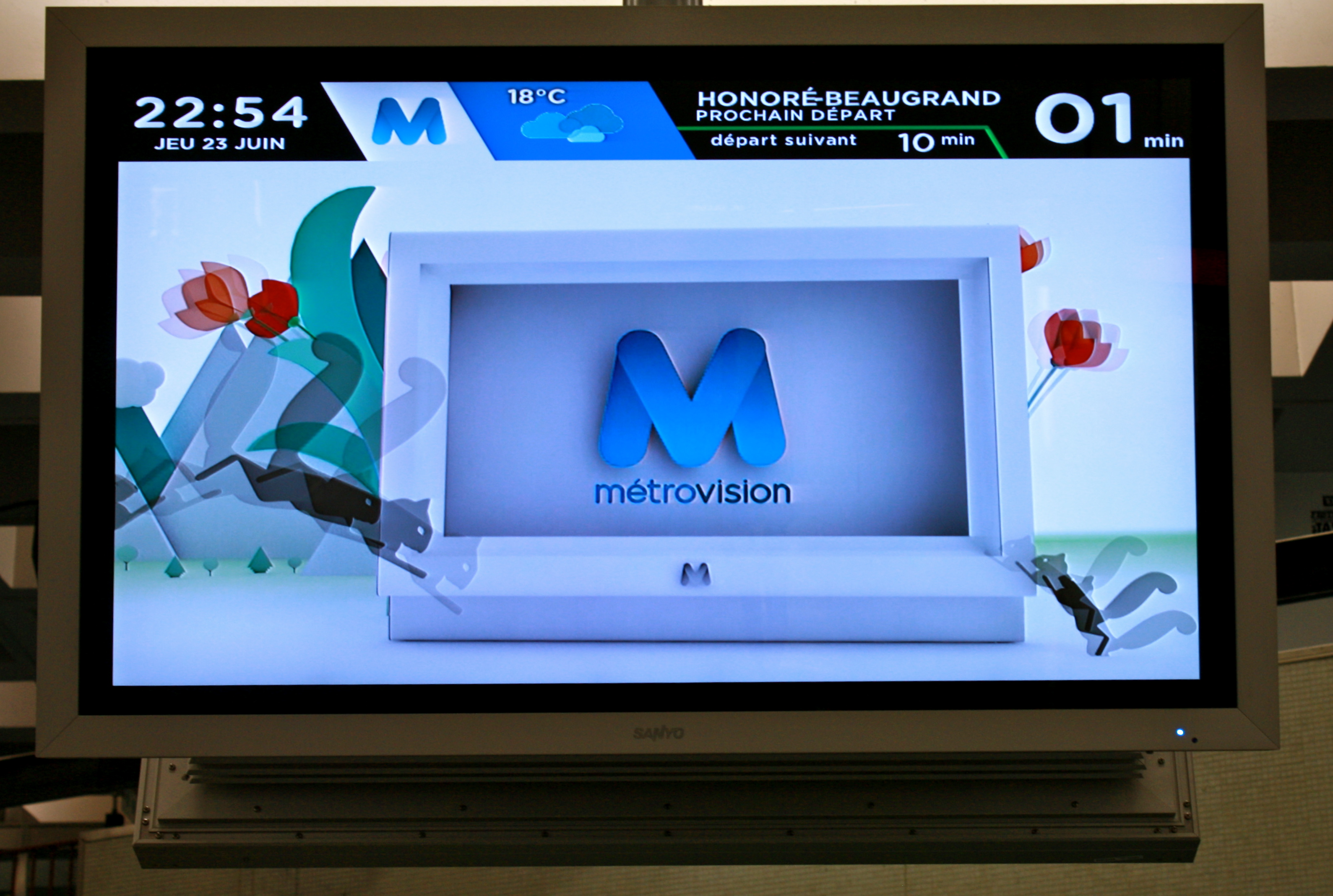
A MétroVision screen at Place-des-Arts station in 2011, showing the former interface

Since 2004, metro stations are equipped with MétroVision information screens displaying advertising, news headlines and MétéoMédia weather information, as well as STM-specific information regarding service changes, service delays and other information about using the system. By the end of 2014, the STM had installed screens in all 68 stations. Berri–UQAM station was the first station to have these screens installed.

=== Ridership ===
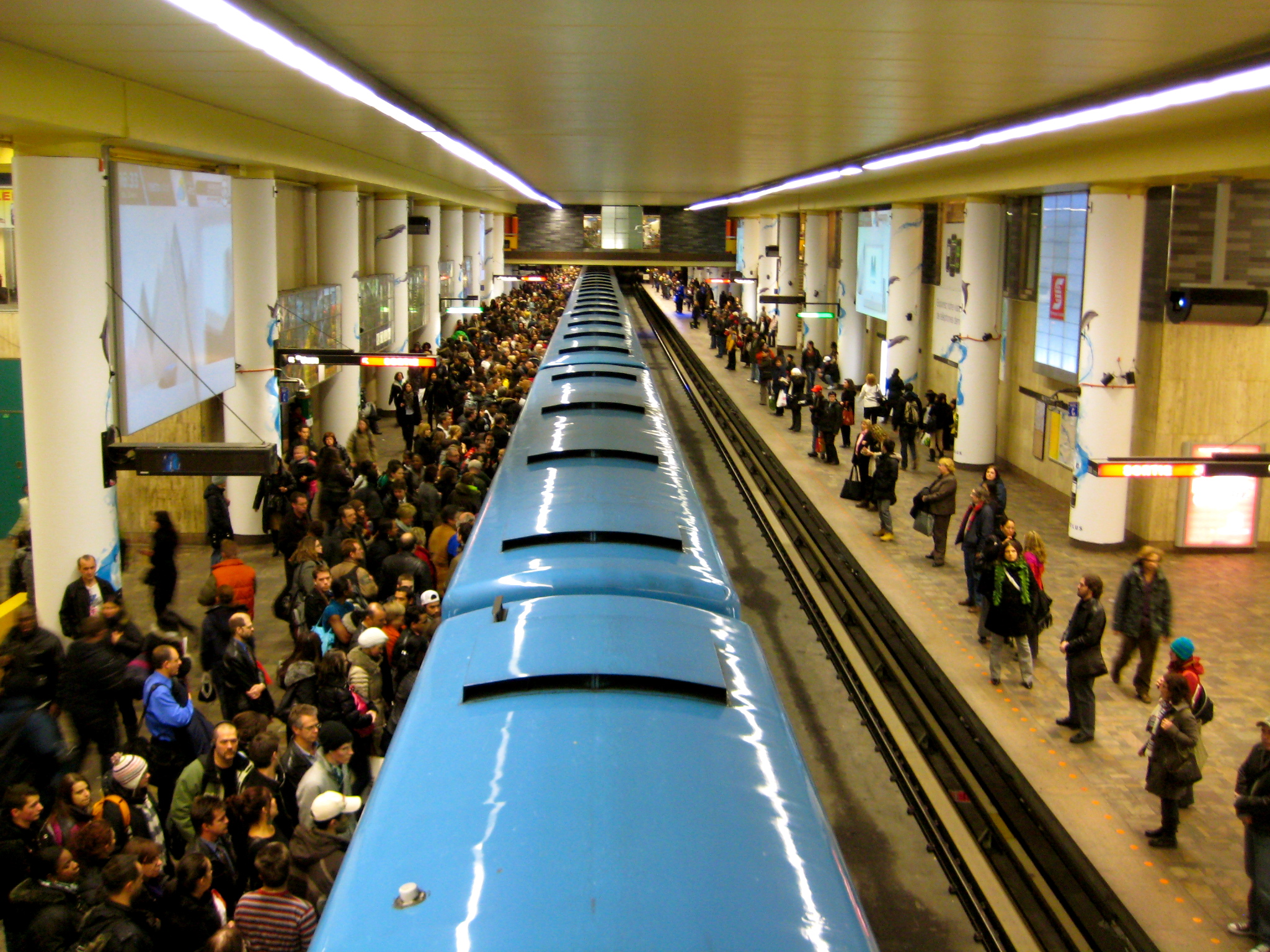
A train at McGill station during rush hour

Montreal Metro ridership has more than doubled since it opened: the number of passengers increased from 136 million in 1967 to 357 million in 2014. Montreal has one of North America's busiest public transportation systems with, after New York, the largest number of users compared to its population. However, this growth was not continuous: in the late 1960s and early 1990s, ridership declined during some periods. From 1996 to 2015, the number of passengers grew. Today, portions of the busiest lines, such as the Green Line between Berri–UQAM and McGill stations and the Orange Line between Jean-Talon and Champ-de-Mars, experience overcrowding during peak hours. It is not uncommon for travellers in these sections to let several trains pass before being able to board. Conditions at these stations worsen in summer because of the lack of air conditioning and heat generated by the trains.

In 2014, the five most popular stations (in millions of inbound travellers) were Berri–UQAM (12.8), McGill (11.1), Bonaventure (8.1), Guy–Concordia (8.1) and Côte-Vertu (7.6); all of these but Côte-Vertu are located downtown. The least busy station is Georges-Vanier, with 773,078 entries in 2011.

=== Funding ===
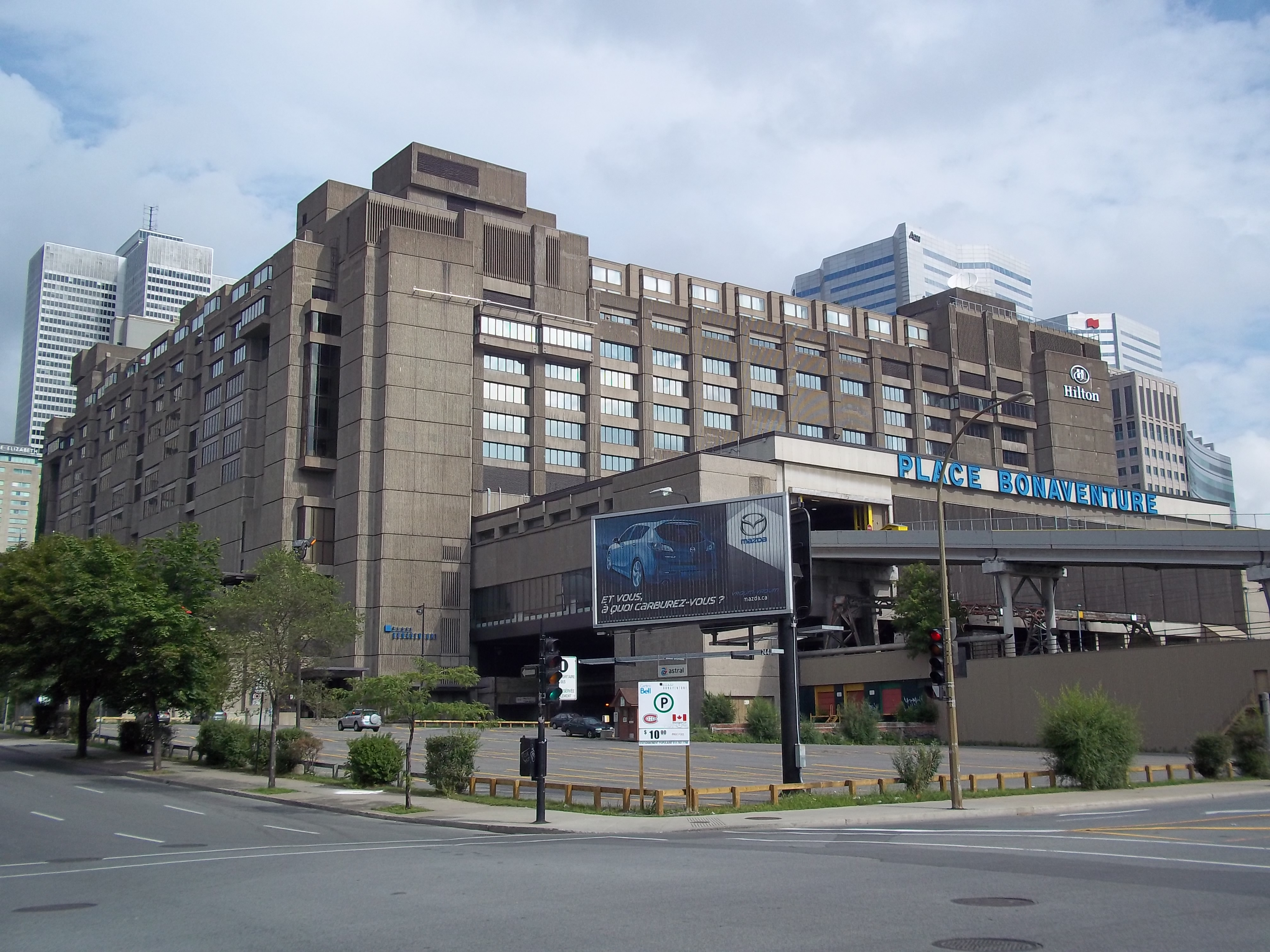
STM headquarters Place Bonaventure

The network operations funding (maintenance, equipment purchase and salaries) is provided by the STM. Tickets and subscriptions cover only 40% of the actual operational costs, with the shortfall offset by the urban agglomeration of Montreal (28%), the Montreal Metropolitan Community (5%) and the Government of Quebec (23%).

The STM does not keep separate accounts for Metro and buses services, therefore the following figures include both activities. In 2016, direct operating revenue planned by the STM totalled $667 million. To compensate for the reduced rates, the city will pay $513 million plus $351 million from Quebec. For a budget of $1.53 billion, salaries account for 57% of expenditures, followed in importance by financial expenses (22%) resulting from a 2.85 billion debt. For the Metro only, wages represented 75% of the $292 million operating costs, before electricity costs (9%).

Heavy investment (network extensions) is entirely funded by the provincial government. Renovations and service improvements are subsidized up to 100% by the Government of Canada, the province and the urban agglomeration. For example, 74% of the rolling stock replacement cost is paid for by Quebec while 33% of the bill for upgrades to ventilation structures is covered by the federal government. Small investments to maintain the network in working order remain entirely the responsibility of the STM.

=== Security ===
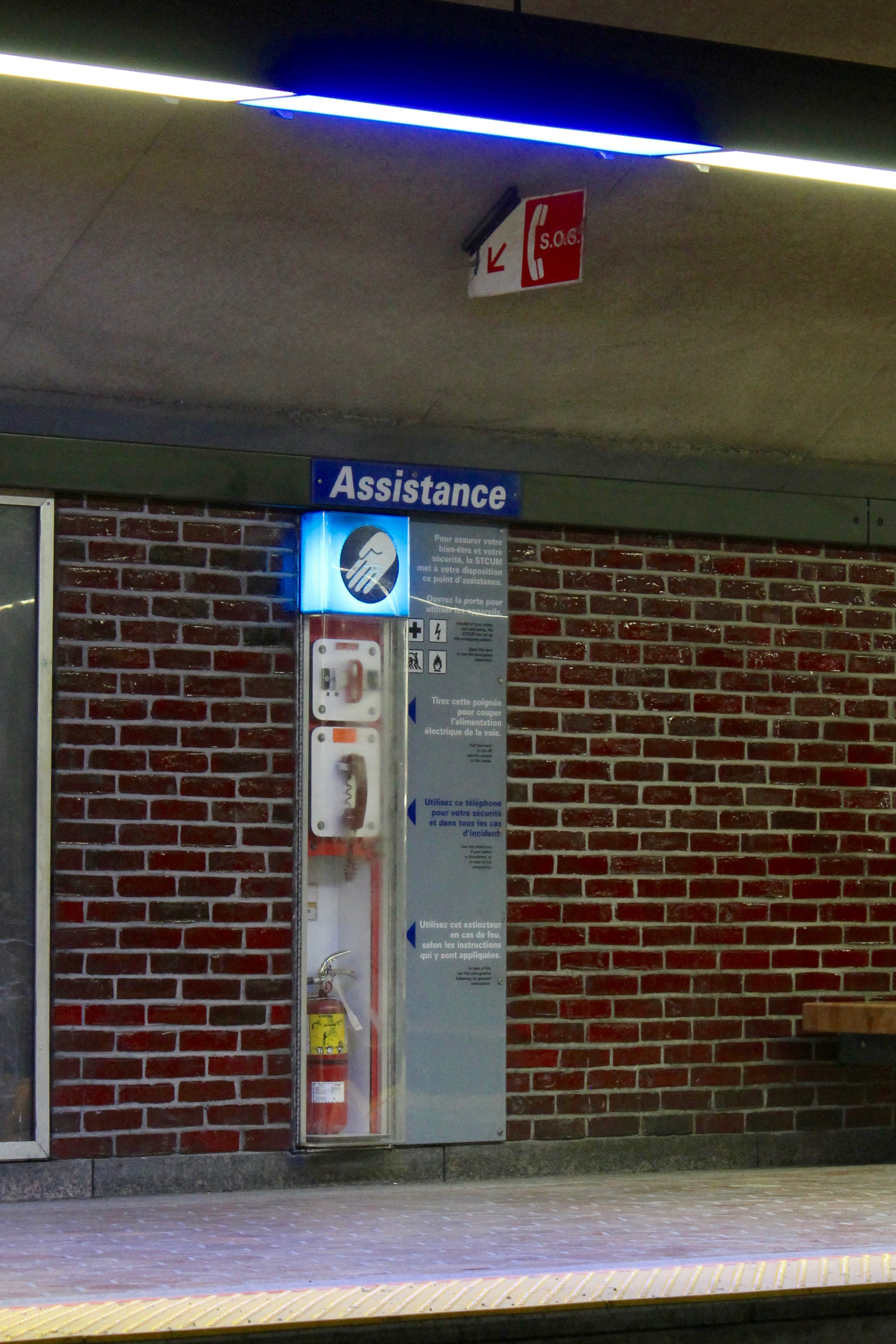
Emergency station on a platform

Montreal Metro facilities are patrolled daily by 155 STM inspectors and 115 agents of the Montreal Police Service (SPVM) assigned to the subway. They are in contact with the command centre of the Metro which has 2,000 cameras distributed on the network, coupled with a computerized visual recognition system.

On station platforms, emergency points are available with a telephone connected to the command centre, an emergency power supply cut-off switch and a fire extinguisher. The power supply system is segmented into short sections that can be independently powered, so that following an incident a single train can be stopped while the others reach the nearest station.

In tunnels, a raised path at trains level facilitates evacuation and allows people movement without walking on the tracks. Every 15 meters, directions are indicated by illuminated green signs. Every 150 meters, emergency stations with telephones, power switches and fire hoses can be found. At the ventilation shafts locations in the old tunnels or every 750 meters in recent tunnels sections (Laval), emergency exits reach the surface.

On the surface, blue fire hydrants in the streets are dry risers connected to the Metro fire control system. If a fire breaks out in tunnels, firefighters connect the red fire hydrant with the blue terminals to power the subway system. This decoupling prevents accidental flooding.

== Station design ==
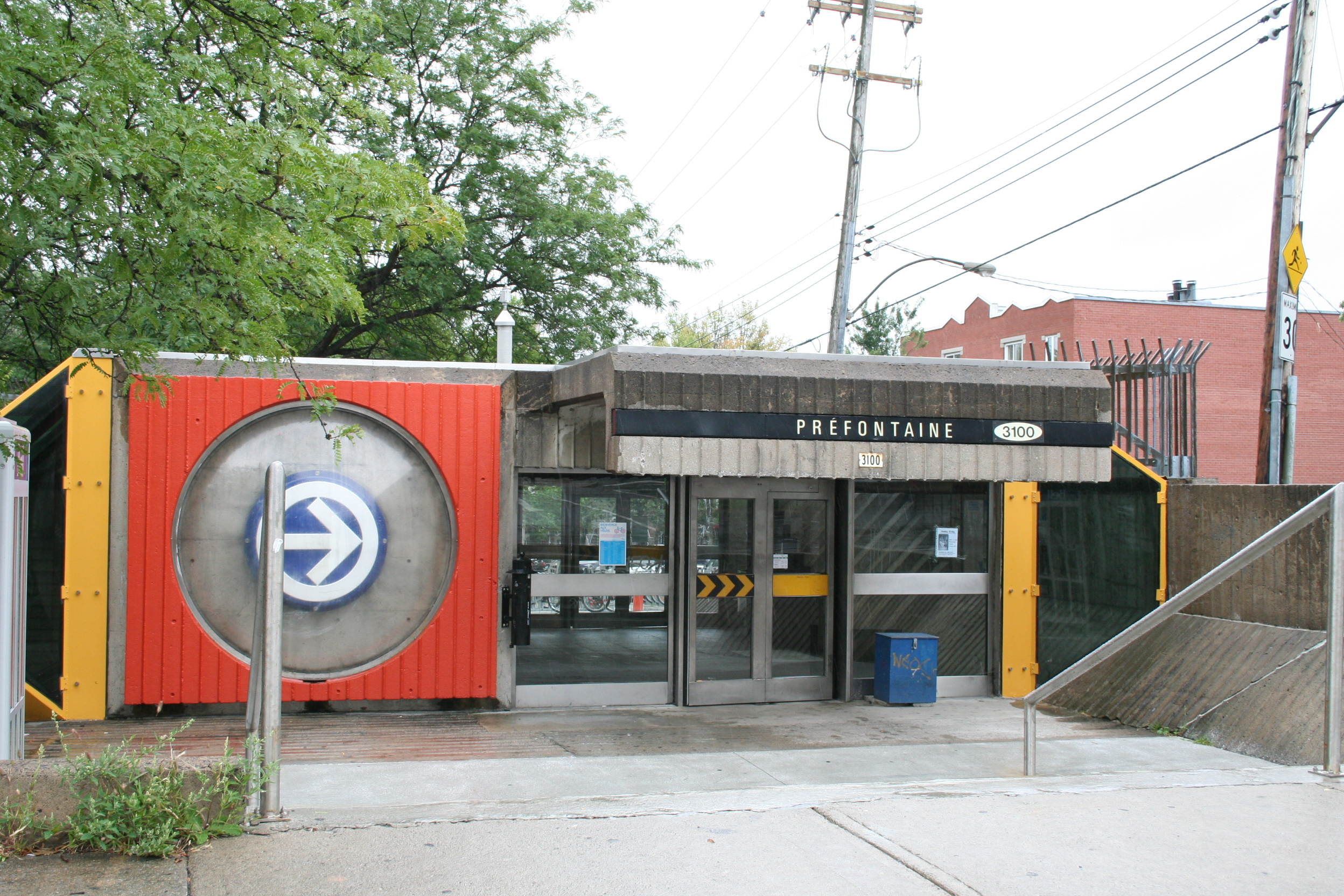
Préfontaine station entrance building

The design of the Metro was heavily influenced by Montreal's winter conditions. Unlike other cities' subways, nearly all station entrances in Montreal are set back from the sidewalk and completely enclosed; usually in small, separate buildings or within building facades. They are equipped with swivelling "butterfly" doors meant to mitigate the wind caused by train movements that can make doors difficult to open. The entire system runs underground and some stations are directly connected to buildings, making the Metro an integral part of Montreal's Underground City.

The network has 68 stations, four of which have connections between Metro lines, and five connect to the commuter train network. They are mostly named after streets adjacent to them.

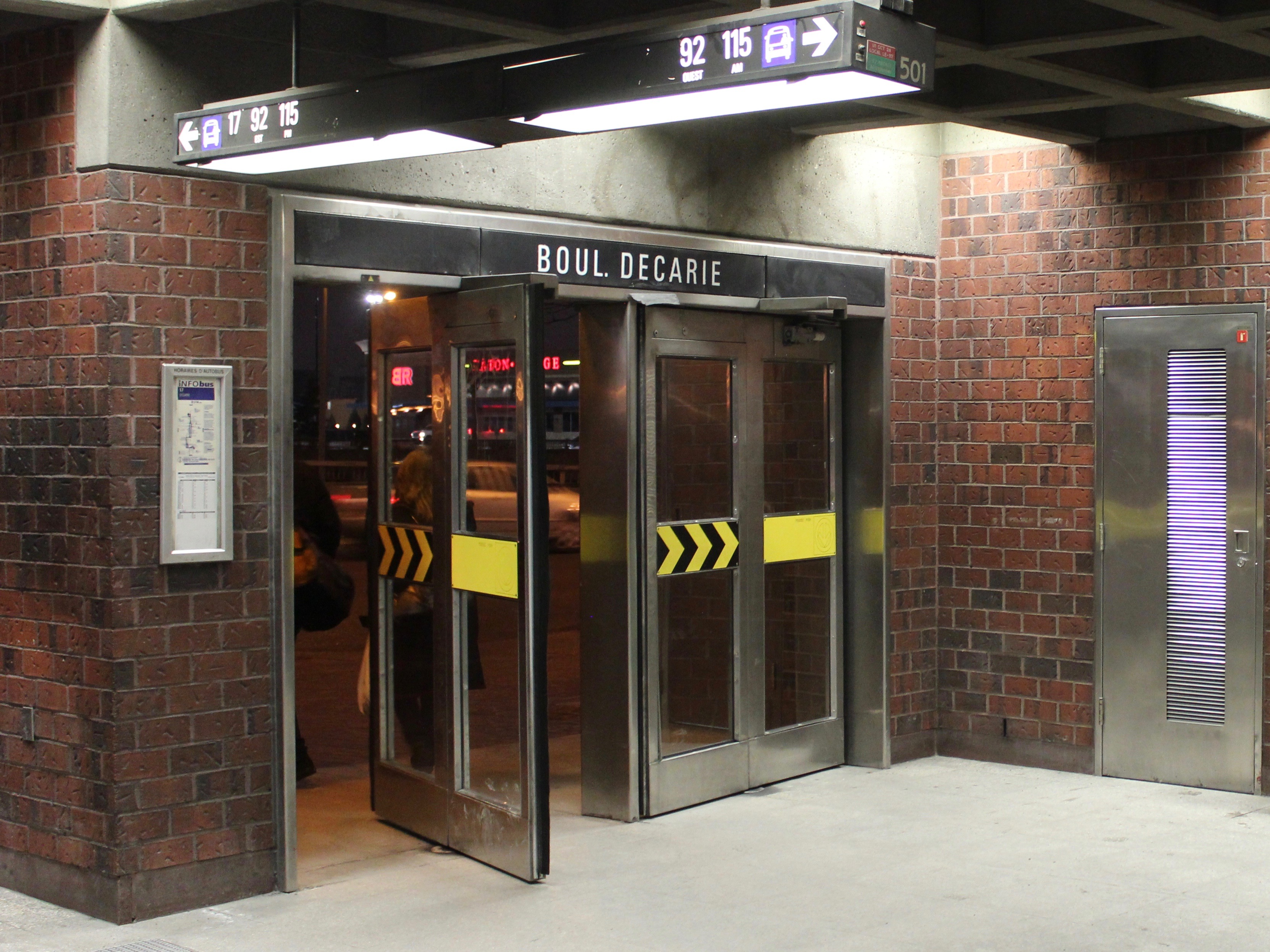
Namur swivelling doors

The average distance between stations is 950 metres (1,040 yd), with a minimum in the city centre between Peel and McGill stations 297 metres (325 yd) and a maximum between Berri–UQAM and Jean-Drapeau stations of 2.36 kilometres (1.47 mi). The average station depth is 15 metres (49 ft), the deepest station of the network, Charlevoix, has its Honoré-Beaugrand bound platform located 29.6 metres (97 ft) underground. The shallowest stations are Angrignon and Longueuil–Université-de-Sherbrooke terminus, 4.3 metres (14 ft) below surface.

Platforms, 152.4 metres (500 ft) long and at least 3.8 metres (12 ft) wide, are positioned on either sides of the tracks except in the Lionel-Groulx, Snowdon and Jean-Talon stations, where they are superimposed to facilitate transfers between lines in certain directions. Charlevoix and De l'Église stations are designed with bunk platforms for engineering reasons, the basement rock in their area (shales) being too brittle for a station with a larger footprint. The terminus stations of future extensions could be equipped with central platforms to accommodate a turning loop.

=== Architectural design and public art ===
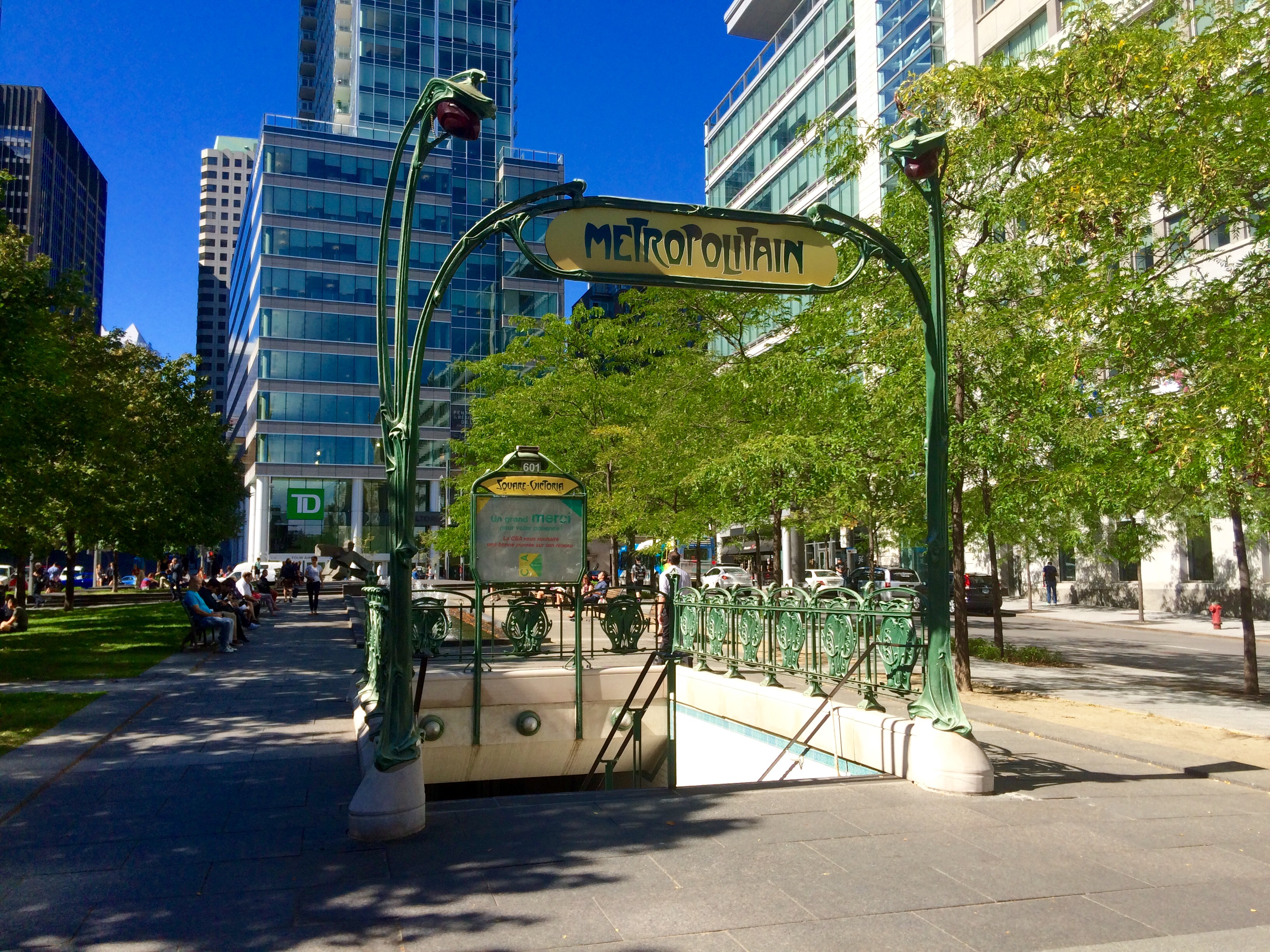
One of the entrances to the Square-Victoria–OACI station looks like a Paris Métro station. This original Hector Guimard gate was a gift from the city of Paris.

The Montreal Metro is renowned for its architecture and public art. Under the direction of Drapeau, a competition among Canadian architects was held to decide the design of each station, ensuring that every station was built in a different style by a different architect. Several stations, such as Berri–UQAM, are important examples of modernist architecture, and various system-wide design choices were informed by the International Style. However, numerous interventions, such as the installation of public telephones and loudspeakers, with visible wiring, have had a significant impact on the elegance of many stations.

Along with the Stockholm Metro, Montreal pioneered the installation of public art in the Metro among capitalist countries, a practice that beforehand was mostly found in socialist and communist nations (the Moscow Metro being a case in point). More than fifty stations are decorated with over one hundred works of public art, such as sculpture, stained glass, and murals by noted Quebec artists, including members of the famous art movement, the Automatistes.

Some of the most important works in the Metro include the stained-glass window at Champ-de-Mars station, the masterpiece of major Quebec artist Marcelle Ferron; and the Guimard entrance at Square-Victoria-OACI station, largely consisting of parts from the famous entrances designed for the Paris Métro, on permanent loan since 1966 by the RATP to commemorate its cooperation in constructing the Metro. Installed in 1967 (the 100th anniversary of Hector Guimard's birth), this is the only authentic Guimard entrance in use outside Paris. (Note: Although reproductions using original molds were given to Mexico City (Bellas Artes station on Line 8), Chicago (Van Buren Street station on the Metra network), Lisbon (Picoas station on the Yellow Line) and Moscow (Kiyevskaya station on the Arbatsko-Pokrovskaya line).)

=== Accessibility ===
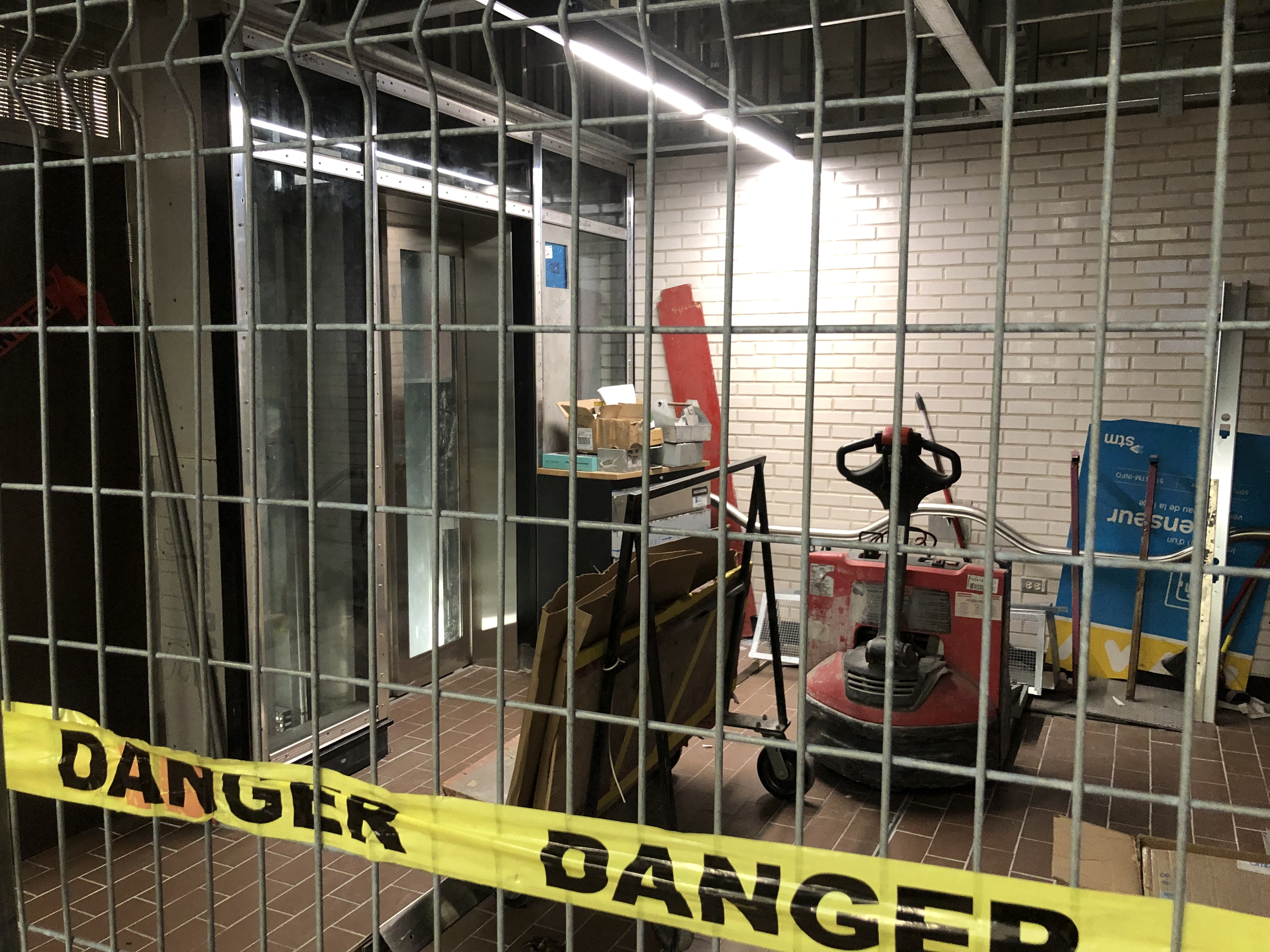
Elevator under construction at Atwater station, February 2025

The Montreal Metro was a late adopter of accessibility compared to many metro systems (including those older than the Metro), much to the dismay and criticism of accessibility advocates in Montreal. The first accessible stations on the system were the three stations in Laval, Cartier, De la Concorde and Montmorency, which opened in 2007 as part of the Orange Line extension. Four existing stations – Lionel-Groulx, Berri–UQAM, Henri-Bourassa, and Côte-Vertu – were made accessible between 2009 and 2010.

As of April 2026, there were 31 accessible stations on the system, most of which are on the Orange Line. All interchange stations between subway lines are accessible, but Berri–UQAM is currently only accessible for the Orange and Green lines. From May 2022, work is underway at Berri–UQAM to make the station fully accessible.

In 2015, the new McGill University Health Centre mega-hospital opened adjacent to Vendôme station, with a new underground pedestrian tunnel to link the hospital to the station. However, the STM was criticized as many visitors to the hospital have reduced mobility and the station was not accessible. Work began in 2017 to make the station accessible; it was completed in 2021.

The Montreal Metro officially aimed to have 30 accessible stations in 2025 and aims to have 41 stations accessible by 2030, and expects all subway stations to be accessible by 2038. In comparison, the Toronto subway (first opened in 1954) will be fully accessible by 2028, and all Vancouver SkyTrain stations have been accessible from that system's opening in 1985, save for Granville station, which became accessible in 2006.

== Rolling stock ==
The Montreal Metro's car fleet uses rubber tires instead of steel wheels. As the Metro runs entirely underground, the cars and the electrical system are not weatherproof. The trains are 2.5 metres (8 ft 2 3/8 in) wide, narrower than the trains used by most other North American subway systems. This narrow width allowed the use of single tunnels (for both tracks) in construction of the Metro lines.

The first generation of rolling stock in Montreal went beyond just adopting the MP 59 car from the Paris Métro. North American cities building metro systems in the 1960s and 1970s (Washington, D.C., San Francisco and Atlanta) were in search of modern rolling stock that not only best fit their needs but also encompassed a change in industrial design that focused on the aesthetics and performances. Until June 2018, some of the Montreal trains were among the oldest North American subway trains in service – the Canadian Vickers MR-63 dating back to the system's opening in 1966 – but extended longevity is expected of rolling stock operated under fully sheltered conditions.

Unlike the subway cars of most metro systems in North America, but like those in most of Europe, Montreal's cars do not have air conditioning. In summer, the lack of cooled air can make trips uncomfortable for passengers. The claim, stated by the STM, is that with the Metro being built entirely underground, air conditioning would heat the tunnels to temperatures that would be too hot to operate the trains.

=== Models ===
==== Current ====
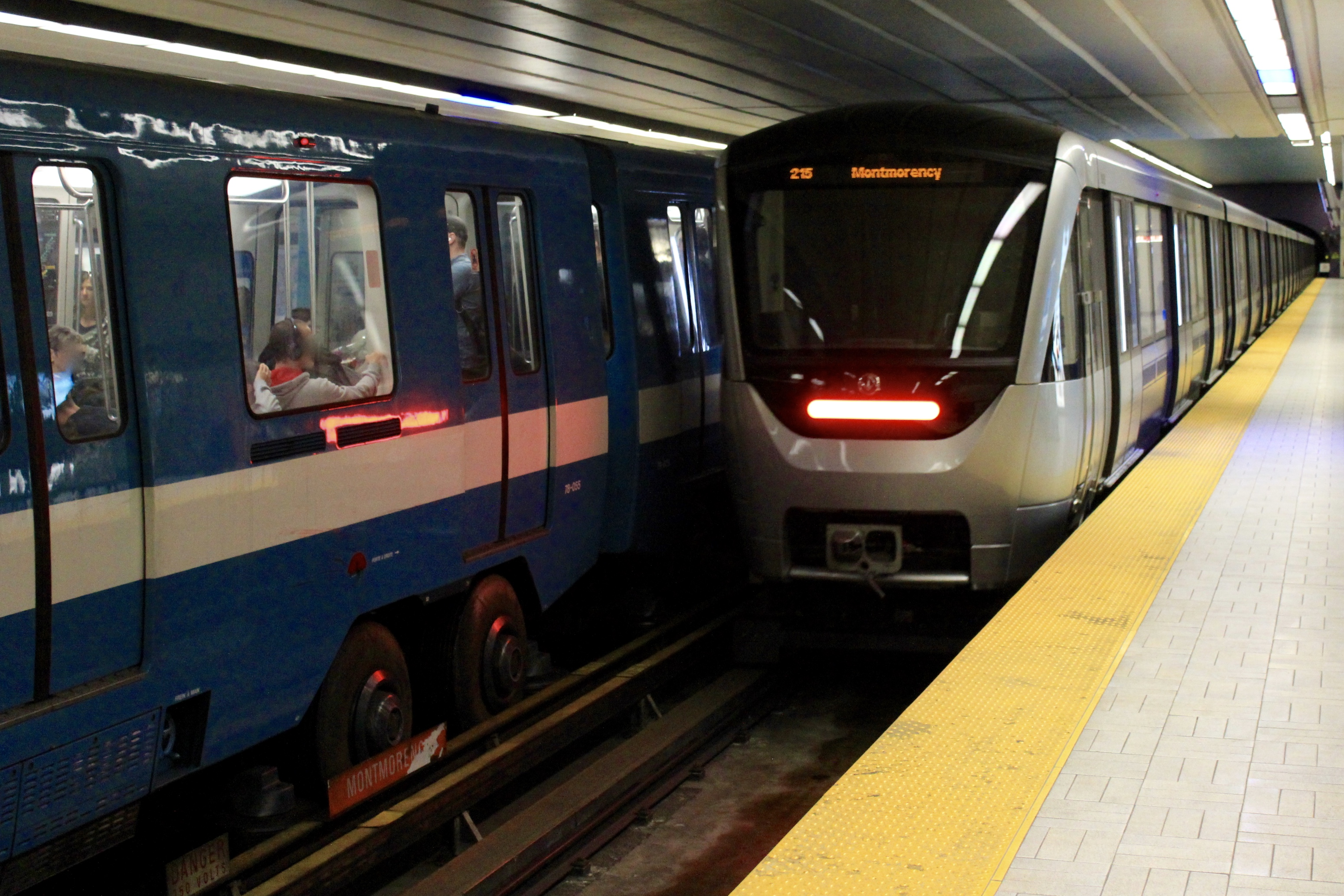
An MPM-10 train next to an MR-73

- Bombardier Transportation MR-73, introduced in 1976. Once used in majority on the Orange Line and Blue Lines, they were migrated to the Green and Yellow Lines as the MR-63s were being retired. They are now the sole rolling stock on the Blue and Yellow Lines, and run alongside the MPM-10 on the Green Line during rush hour periods.
- Bombardier-Alstom MPM-10, named "Azur" by the public in 2012, entered service in 2016. The order completely replaced the outgoing MR-63 model. They use an open gangway design that allows passengers to walk from one end of the train to the other. They are currently the sole rolling stock running on the Orange Line, and run in mixed service with the MR-73s on the Green Line at rush hour. On weekends and off-peak hours, only Azur trains are used on the Green Line.

==== Retired ====
- Canadian Vickers MR-63, were in service from the metro's opening in October 1966 until June 2018. Of the original 369 cars built, 33 were destroyed in two separate accidents. On June 21, 2018, the last of the MR-63 trains was completely retired after 52 years of service.

Name	Delivered	Withdrawn	Lines	Number of cars	Notes
MR-63	1965–1967	2016–2018	Formerly Green, Orange, Yellow, Blue	Formerly 336	Only ran on the Blue Line on June 21, 2018.
MR-73	1976–1980	63 trainsets: 2021	Green, Yellow, Blue Formerly Orange	360 Formerly 423	Ran on the Orange Line from 1985 to 2018. 63 cars were retired and scrapped in June 2021 across the network.
MPM-10 "Azur"	2015–2021	—N/a	Green and Orange	639 (71 trainsets)	In service since February 2016 on the Orange Line, and since October 2017 on the Green Line.

=== Design ===
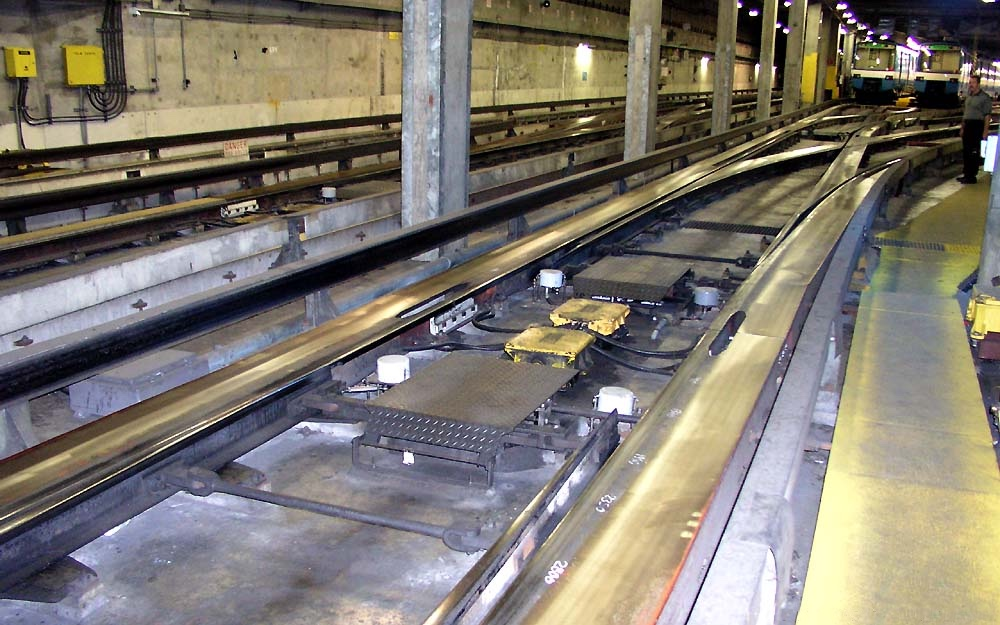
Switches use conventional points on the standard gauge track to guide trains. Rubber tires, rolling on concrete rollways, support the full weight of the trains as they go through switches. Guideways are provided in order to ensure there are no gaps in the electrical power supply.

Montreal's Metro trains are made of low-alloy high-tensile steel, painted blue with a thick white band running lengthwise. Trains are assembled in three-, six- or nine-car lengths. Each three-car segment element consists of two motor cab cars encompassing a trailer car (M-T-M). Each car is 2.5 metres (8 ft 2 3/8 in) wide and has three (MPM-10) or four (MR-63, MR-73) wide bi-parting leaf doors on each side for rapid passenger entry and egress. Design specifications called for station dwell times of typically 8 to 15 seconds. In response to overcrowding on the Orange Line, a redesign of the MR-73 cars removed some seats to provide more standing room. The newest Bombardier MPM-10 trains are open-gangway, allowing passengers to move between cars once on board such that the passenger load is more evenly distributed.

Each car has two sets of bogies (trucks), each with four sets of support tires, guide tires and backup conventional steel wheels. The motor cars' bogies each have two direct-current traction motors coupled to reduction gears and differentials. Montreal's Metro trains use electromagnetic brakes, generated by the train's kinetic energy until it has slowed down to about 10 kilometres per hour (6.2 mph). The train then uses composite brake blocks made of yellow birch injected with peanut oil to bring it to a complete stop. Two sets are applied against the treads of the steel wheels for friction braking. Hard braking produces a characteristic burnt popcorn scent. Wooden brake shoes perform well, but if subjected to numerous high-speed applications they develop a carbon film that diminishes brake performance. The rationale for using wooden brake shoes soaked in peanut oil was health concerns – the use of wooden brake shoes avoids releasing metal dust into the air upon braking. It also reduces screeching noise when braking and prolongs the life of steel wheels.

Rubber tires on the Montreal Metro transmit minimal vibration and help the cars go uphill more easily and negotiate turns at high speeds. However, the advantages of rubber tires are offset by noise levels generated by traction motors which are noisier than the typical North American subway car, although the concrete trackbed favoured over stone ballasting much amplifies the noisiness itself. Trains can climb grades of up to 6.5% and economise the most energy when following a humped-station profile (track profiles that descend to accelerate at leaving a station and ascend upon entering the station). Steel-wheel train technology has undergone significant advances and can better round tight curves, and climb and descend similar grades and slopes. Despite these advances, steel-wheel trains still cannot operate at higher speeds on the same steep or tightly curved track profiles, as opposed to a train equipped with rubber tires.

The release of the MR-73 generation of Metro cars introduced three audible tones heard when departing, generated by chopper circuitry. The chopper circuitry incrementally increases the traction power fed to the trains' traction motors when accelerating from a stop, allowing trains to start smoothly and avoid overloads. The final tone is present throughout the train ride on MR-73s but is not heard at higher speeds because of ambient noise. Equipment on the newest generation of Metro cars does not produce the audible tones when accelerating, though a recording of similar tones is played as an auditory signal in advance of door closure, referred to as the "dou-dou-dou" door closing signal in a 2010 STM advertising campaign. The three tones are essentially the same as the iconic first three trumpet notes from Aaron Copland's musical piece "Fanfare for the Common Man".

Announcements for the Montreal Metro are pre-recorded and voiced by actress Michèle Deslauriers.

=== Train operation ===
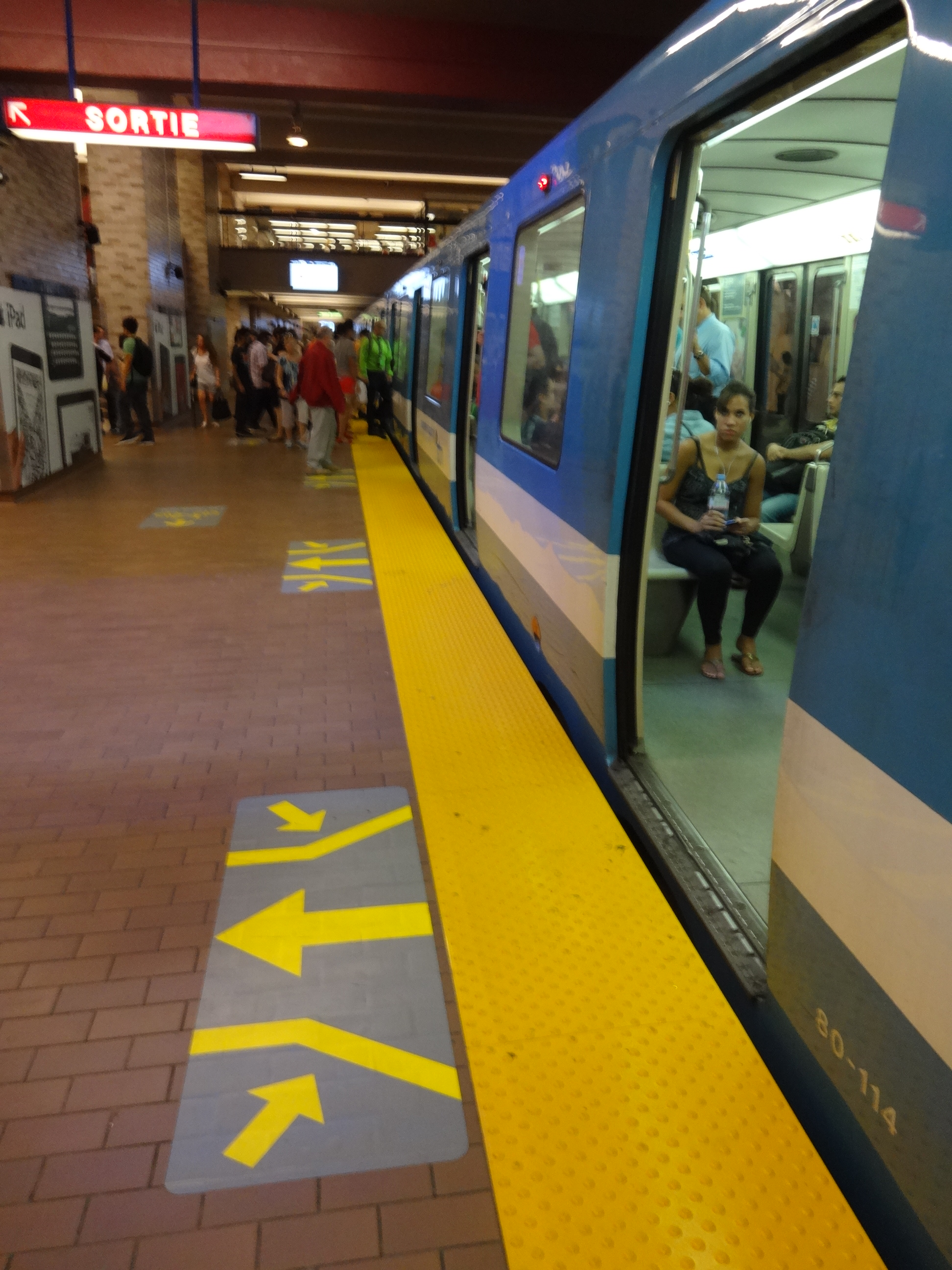
Markings on the floor indicate where the doors will open.

The MR-73 and the former MR-63 trains are equipped with a manual train control system, while the new MPM-10 trains are equipped with an automatic train control system. The train operator can also drive the MPM-10 train manually at their discretion, using the traction/brake control handle. Signalling is effected through coded pulses sent through the rails. Coded speed orders and station stop positions transmitted through track beacons are captured by beacon readers mounted under the driver cabs. The information sent to the train's electronic modules conveys speed information, and it is up to the train automatic control system computer to conform to the imposed speed. Additionally, the train computer can receive energy-saving instructions from track beacons, providing the train with four different economical coasting modes, plus one mode for maximum performance. In case of manual control, track speed is displayed on the cab speedometer indicating the maximum permissible speed. They occasionally reach their speed limit of 72 km/h (45 mph) depending on grade and load. The wayside signals consist of point (switch/turnout) position indicators in proximity to switches and inter-station signalling placed at each station stop.

Trains are programmed to stop at certain station positions with a precise odometer (accurate to plus or minus five centimetres, 2"). They receive their braking program and station stop positions orders (one-third, two-thirds, or end of station) from track beacons prior to entering the station, with additional beacons in the station for ensuring stop precision. The last beacon is positioned at precisely 12 turns of wheels from the end of the platform, which help improve the overall precision of the system.

Trains draw current from two sets of 750-volt direct current guide bar/third rails on either side of each motor car. Nine-car trains draw large currents of up to 6,000 amperes, requiring that all models of rolling stock have calibrated traction motor control systems to prevent power surges, arcing and breaker tripping. Both models have electrical braking (using motors) to assist primary friction braking, reducing the need to replace the brake pads.

The trains are equipped with double coverage broadband radio systems, provided by Thales Group.

== Rolling stock maintenance ==
=== Garages ===
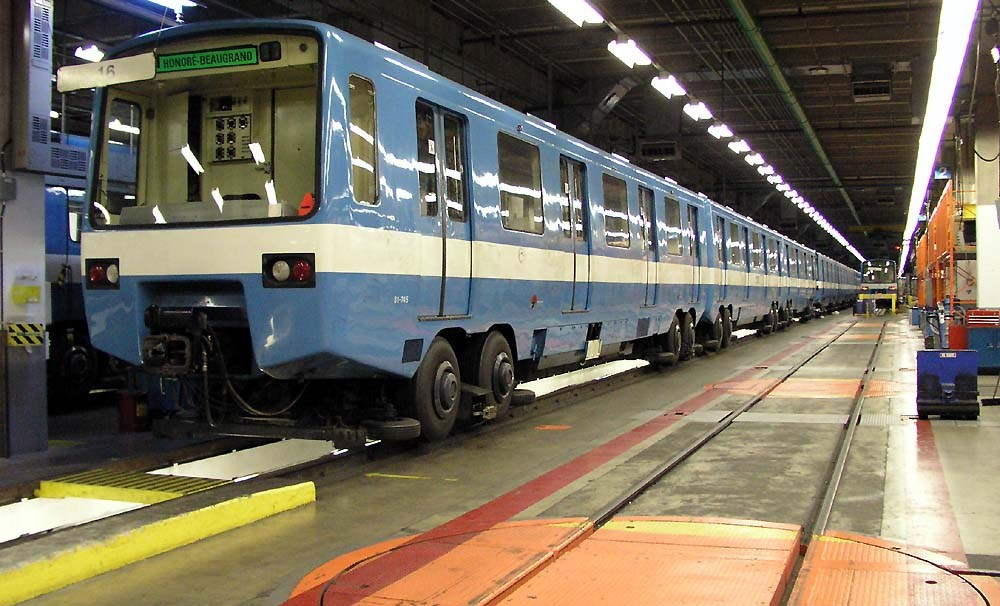
An older generation MR-63 train in the Beaugrand Garage. A turntable used to change tracks is in the foreground.

Idle trains are stored in five garages: Angrignon, Beaugrand, Côte-Vertu, Saint-Charles and Montmorency. Except Angrignon, they are all underground and can accommodate around 46% of the rolling stock. Remaining trains are parked in terminus tail tracks.

- Angrignon garage, west of Angrignon the Green Line terminus, is a surface building next to Angrignon Park housing six tracks accepting two nine-car trains each.
- Beaugrand garage is located east of the Green Line terminus Honoré-Beaugrand. It is entirely under the Chénier-Beaugrand Park, and its main access point is through the Honoré-Beaugrand station. It has seven tracks and accommodates light maintenance on MR-63 cars with two test tracks.
- Saint-Charles garage, north of Henri-Bourassa terminus, is located under Gouin Park. With eight tracks, allowing 20 trains to be parked, it is the main garage of the Orange Line. Also, under Jeanne-Sauvé Park, a training facility used by the firefighters contains one of the burnt MR-63 cars from 1973 and an obsolete picking train.
- Montmorency garage is built perpendicular to its terminal station to allow an easier potential expansion of the Orange Line deeper in Laval territory.
- Côte-Vertu garage was constructed underground at the end of Thimens boulevard to accommodate additional MPM-10 trains on the Orange Line. Accessible via a 600-metre (660 yd) tunnel, it houses a small maintenance facility and two long tracks for a total of twelve parking places. Two more tracks could be added later with the line extension.

=== Maintenance and repair facilities ===
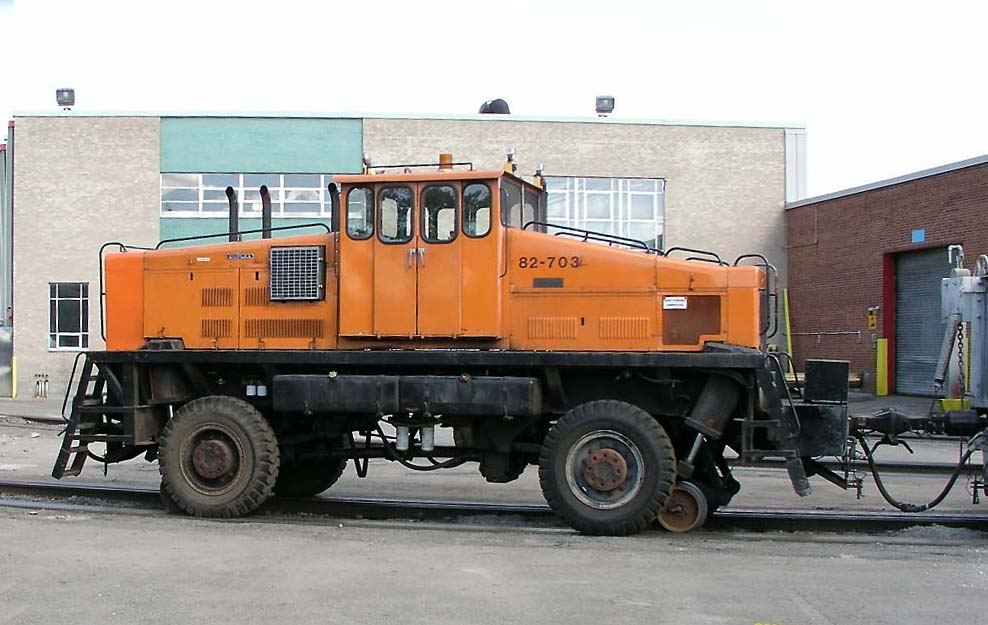
Heavy work trains are hauled with sizeable tractors, such as this 1966 "Duplex". Traction is effected through the rubber-tired wheels and guidance through the retractable flanged wheel. This tractor can also operate on the road.

Rolling stock maintenance is effected in five facilities in four locations. Two small tracks are located at Montmorency and Beaugrand garages, and two large are at the Plateau d'Youville facility. A fifth facility was constructed at the Côte-Vertu garage.

The only repair facility for the Montreal Metro is the Atelier Plateau d'Youville, located at the intersection of Crémazie (part of Trans-Canada Highway) and Saint-Laurent Boulevards. Built alongside the first segment and opened in October 1966 on the site of a former streetcar depot, it is a large above-ground facility that provides major repairs to Metro cars and is the main base for the track assembly workshops (where track sections are pre-assembled prior to installation). The two-way service tunnel connecting the network to the Youville portal gate is found between Crémazie and Sauvé stations. Formerly, the Atelier Plateau d'Youville was connected to the Canadian national rail network with a connecting track to the CN St Laurent Subdivision, which was mainly used for delivery of MR-63 trains.

=== Tail tracks and connecting tracks ===
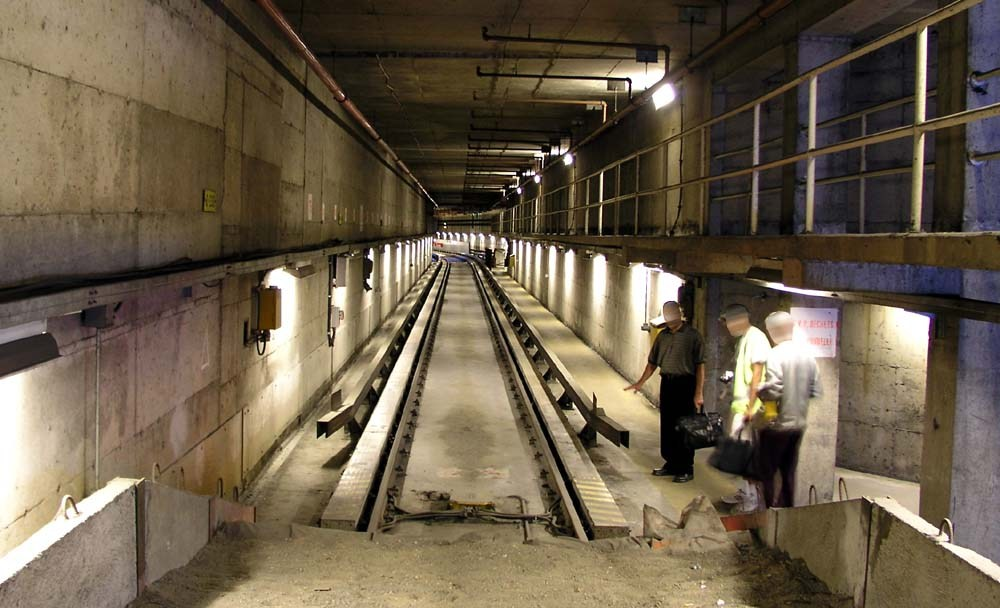
View of a track from a sandpile bumper post showing the cross-section of guide bars, concrete rollways and conventional track

- Centre d'attachement Duvernay is a garage and base for maintenance of way equipment. It accesses the network through the Green Line / Orange Line interchange southeast of Lionel-Groulx. The access building is located at the corner of Duvernay and Vinet streets in Sainte-Cunégonde.
- Centre d'attachement Viau is a garage and base for maintenance of way equipment. It accesses the network immediately west of the Viau station (Green Line). The access building is within the Viau station building; facilities are visible from trains going west of the station.
- Berri–UQAM link is connecting the Green and Yellow Lines south of Berri–UQAM station.
- Snowdon link and tail is an interchange track between the Orange and Blue Lines southwest of Snowdon station used for the storage of maintenance of way equipment. There are no surface facilities. The tail tracks west of Snowdon station extend about 790 metres (860 yd) west of the station, reaching the border of the city of Hampstead. The end of the track is marked by an emergency exit on the corner of Queen Mary and Dufferin Roads.
- Côte-Vertu tail track extends 900 metres (980 yd) after the terminus station towards the intersection of Grenet and Deguire streets.

== Future projects ==
=== City of Montreal ===
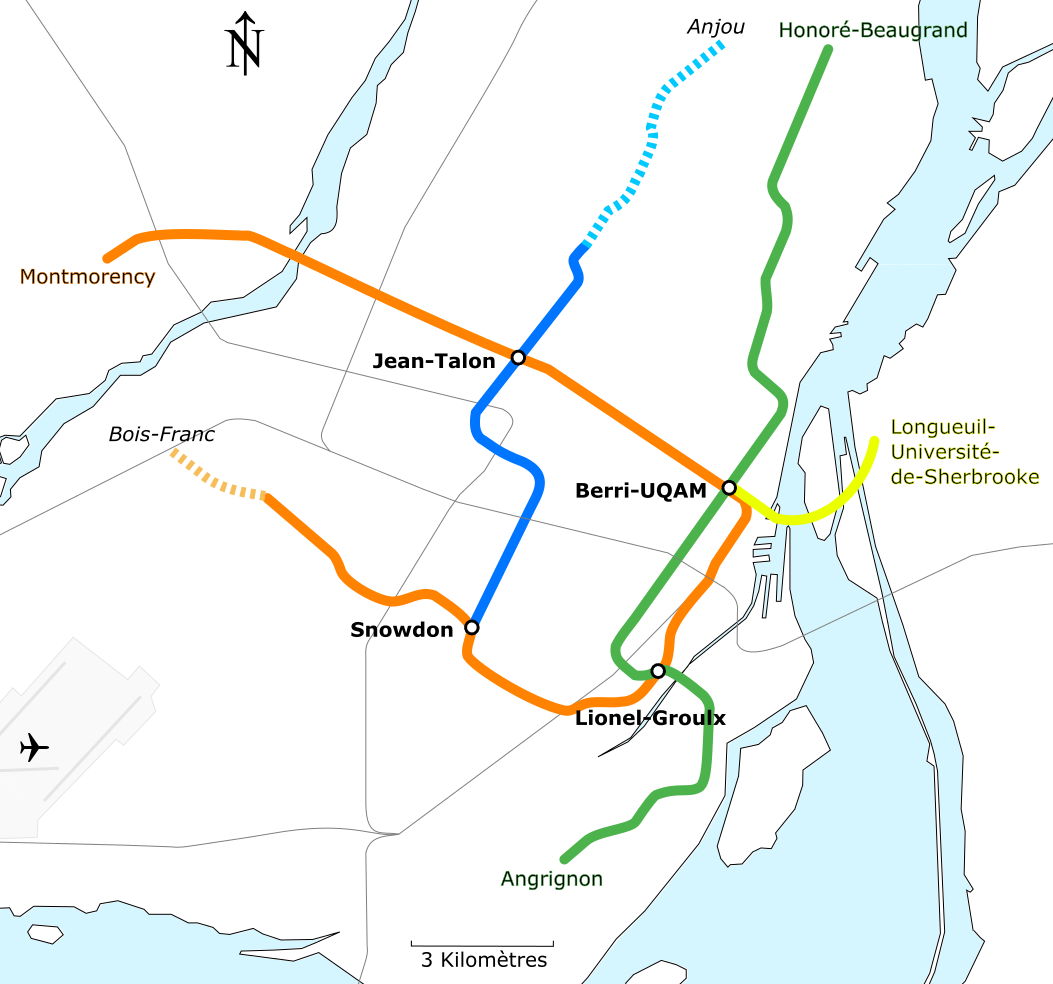
Projected extensions of the Metro network in Montreal

On June 12, 2008, the City of Montreal released its overall transportation plan for the immediate future. On April 9, 2018, construction on the Blue Line's five new stations was announced and began in 2021. The following projects were given priority status in the overall transportation scheme:

- The Blue Line extension from Saint-Michel station up to the boroughs of Saint-Leonard and Anjou, committing to the line's original design. It will consist of five new stations: Vertières, Mary-Two-Axe-Earley, Césira-Parisotto, Madeleine-Parent and Anjou.
- The Orange Line extension northwest from Côte-Vertu station, up to the existing Bois-Franc rail station, with an intermediate station at Rue Poirier. The station at Bois-Franc would be intermodal with the Réseau express métropolitain (part of the Deux-Montagnes commuter rail line at the time of the report).

In the long term, a new extension of the Yellow Line from Berri–UQAM is being studied that would go to McGill station to ease congestion on that part of the Green Line.

In 2006 and 2007, Montreal's West Island newspapers discussed plans to extend the Blue Line from Snowdon into the Notre-Dame-de-Grâce area of Montreal, as depicted in its original design.

=== City of Longueuil ===
In 2001, the Réseau de transport de Longueuil (RTL) has considered an extension of the Yellow Line with four new stations (Vieux-Longueuil, Gentilly, Curé-Poirier/Roland-Therrien and Jacques-Cartier/De Mortagne) beyond Longueuil–Université-de-Sherbrooke, under the city of Longueuil to Collège Édouard-Montpetit but their priority was switched to the construction of the proposed light rail project in the Champlain bridge corridor. In 2008, Longueuil Mayor Claude Gladu brought the proposal back to life.

A 2006 study rejected the possibility and cost of an extension from Lionel-Groulx station to the City of Brossard on the south shore of Montreal as an alternative to the proposed light rail project in the Champlain bridge corridor.

In 2012, the AMT study Vision 2020, proposed extending the Yellow Line under Longueuil with six new stations.

=== City of Laval ===
On July 22, 2007, the mayor of Laval, Gilles Vaillancourt, with the ridership success of the current Laval extension, announced his wish to loop the Orange Line from Montmorency to Côte-Vertu stations with the addition of six (or possibly seven) new stations (three in Laval and another three in Montreal). He proposed that Transports Quebec, the provincial transport department, set aside $100 million annually to fund the project, which is expected to cost upwards of $1.5 billion.

On May 26, 2011, Vaillancourt, after the successful opening of highway 25 toll bridge in the eastern part of Laval, proposed that Laval develop its remaining territories with a transit-oriented development (TOD) build around five new Metro stations: four on the west branch (Gouin, Lévesque, Notre-Dame and Carrefour) of the Orange Line and one more on the east branch (De l'Agora). The next-to-last station on the west branch would act as a corresponding station between the east and the west branches of the line.

== Pioneer in tunnel advertising ==
In the early years of the Montreal Metro's life, a unique mode of advertising was used. In some downtown tunnels, cartoons depicting an advertiser's product were mounted on the walls of the tunnel at the level of the cars' windows. A retail film processing outfit called Direct Film advertised on the north wall in the Westbound track of the Guy (now Guy–Concordia)-to-Atwater Station (Green Line) between 1967 and 1969. Strobe lights, aimed at the frames of the cartoon and triggered by the passing train, sequentially illuminated the images so that they appeared to the viewer (passenger) on the train as a movie. Today known as "tunnel movies" or "tunnel advertising", they have been installed in many cities' subways around the world in recent years, for example in the Southgate tube station in London and the MBTA Red Line in Boston.

== Accidents and incidents ==
- On December 8, 1971, a speeding MR-63 train crashed into a parked MR-63 train near Henri-Bourassa station on the Orange Line, causing a 17-hour inferno that destroyed 24 MR-63 coaches parked at the Henri-Bourassa tail tracks. Operator Gerard Maccarone was the sole fatality in this accident, which was later revealed to be caused by a jammed throttle that prevented the train from braking in time. This was at that time the deadliest subway accident ever to have occurred in Canada until the Russell Hill subway accident on the Toronto subway in 1995.

== See also ==
- List of North American rapid transit systems by ridership
- Transportation in Montreal
- Rapid transit in Canada
- Montreal Expo Express – demo mini-rapid transit line during Expo 67
- Underground City, Montreal

== Notes and references ==
=== Further reading ===
- The Montreal Métro, a source of pride (PDF document)
- P.Laprise, ed. (1983). The Montreal Metro. Montreal: Metropolitan Transit Bureau. ISBN 2-920295-20-9
- Bombardier Transportation. (1974). MR-73: Fiche technique.
- Programme triennial d'immobilisations 2006-2007-2008 (PDF document)
- Voitures de métro MR-73 rénovées (PDF document)
- Rénovation des voitures de métro MR-73 (PDF document)
- Le « dou-dou-dou » du métro – Le hacheur de courant (PDF document)

=== Bibliography ===
- Clairoux, Benoît (2001). Le Métro de Montréal 35 ans déjà (in French). Éditions Hurtubise HMH. ISBN 978-2-89428-526-8.
