= White Line (Montreal Metro) =

Proposed Montreal Metro line

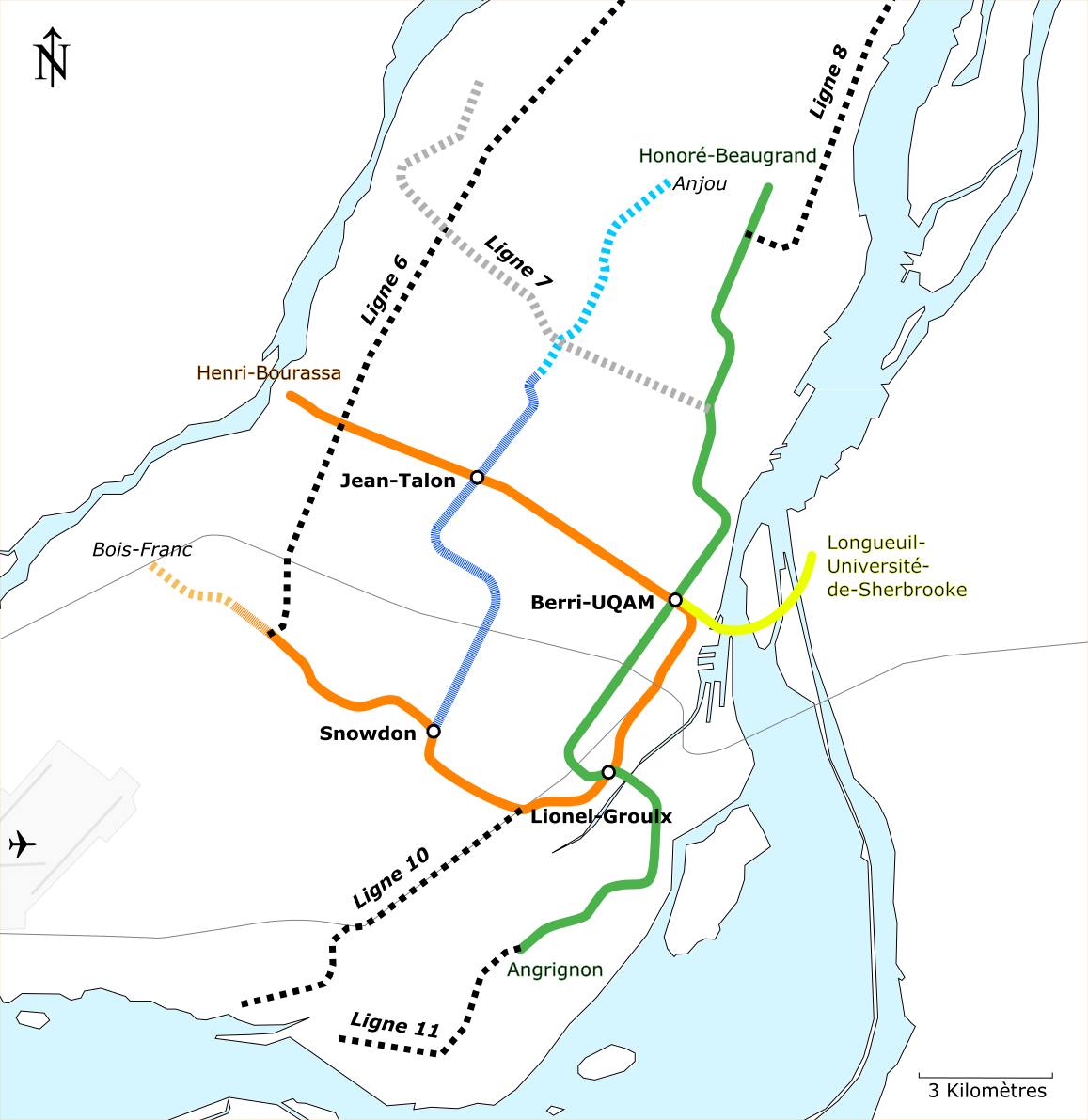
Map of proposed extensions to the Montreal Metro in 1984. Line 7 is depicted by a grey dotted line.

The White Line (French: Ligne blanche), also known as Line 7 (French: Ligne 7), was a proposed line of the Montreal Metro that never made it past its planning stage.

The White Line was first proposed by the Commission de transport de Montréal (CTM) during the initial planning for the Montreal Metro in 1953, and in 1970 the Communauté urbaine de Montréal (CUM) proposed an extension of the Green Line to Montréal-Nord. In September 1983, the Bureau des Transports de Montréal (BTM) proposed a new north-south Line 7 consisting of ten stations, from Pie-IX to Léger, under Boulevard Pie-IX, through Saint-Léonard and north-east towards Rivière-des-Prairies. A year later, at the start of 1984, it was formally proposed by the Communauté urbaine de Montréal (CUM), with 12 stations (from Pie-IX to Maurice-Duplessis/Langelier).

For nearly a decade during the 1980s and 1990s, the line appeared on all official Métro maps, coloured white, so it received the unofficial nickname of "White line". Other nicknames include "Pie-IX line".

The Métro system has another projected subway line, Line 6, whose number was reserved for a surface line proposed by the Ministère des Transports du Québec (MTQ) along the northern shore of the island, but it was never shown on a system map.

Detailed studies on Line 7 are archived at the Grande Bibliothèque, covering the proposed route, station location options, ridership flux, and so on.

The function of what would have been the line was later served by an express bus and now the Pie-IX BRT.

== See also ==
- Red Line (Montreal Metro)
- Line 6 (Montreal Metro)
- Pink Line (Montreal Metro)
