= Line 6 (Montreal Metro) =

Proposed Montreal Metro line

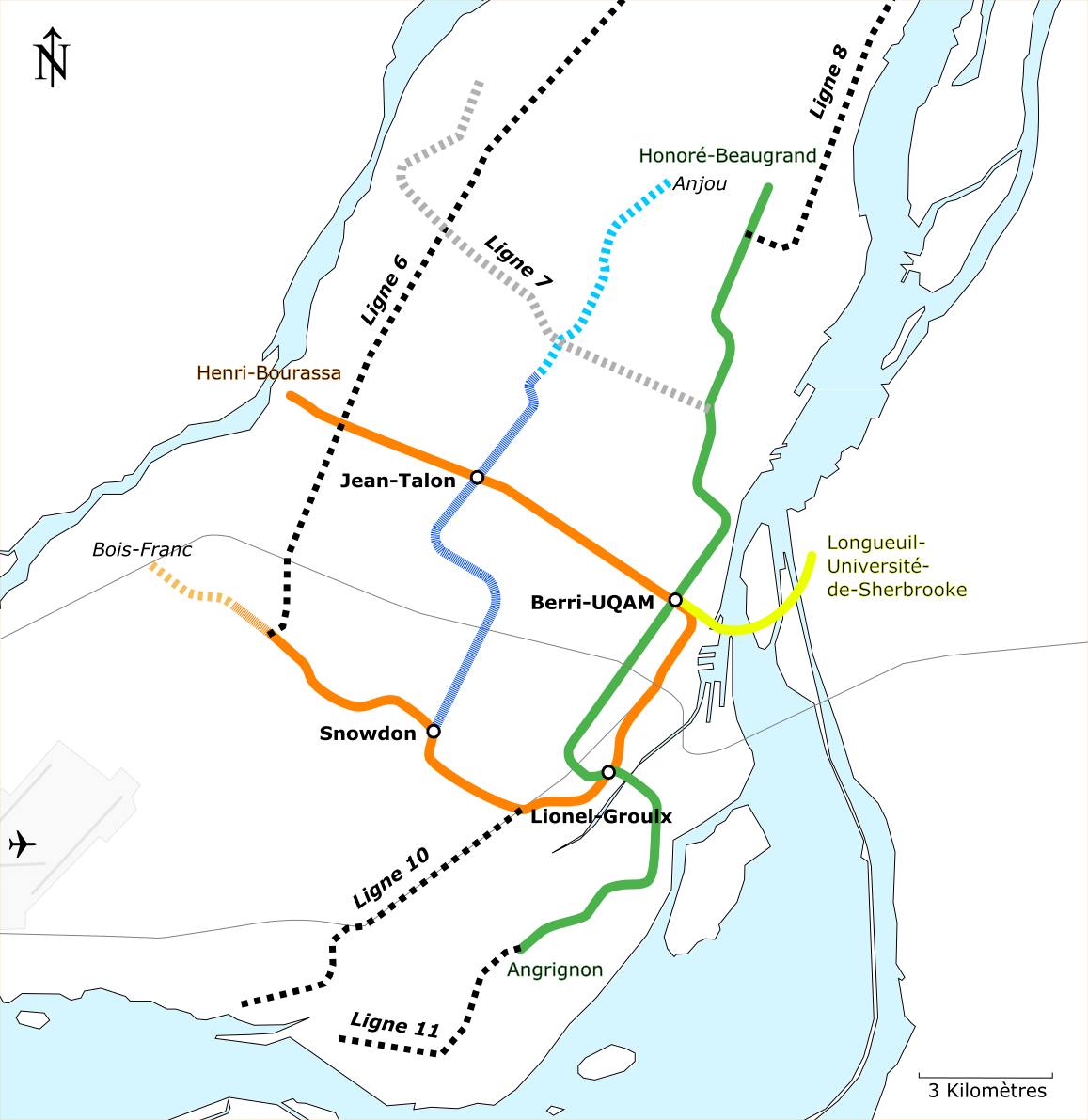
Metro lines and proposed extensions in 1984

Line 6 was a proposed surface-running line of the Montreal Metro. Unlike the rubber-tire technology used on the Metro's current lines, Line 6's trains would have run on steel wheels. Planned as the first of a series of new "regional metro" lines along existing railways in 1979 (similar in concept to the Paris RER and San Francisco BART), the Ministère de Transport du Québec (MTQ) expected Line 6 to begin service along 23.3 km of Canadian National railway tracks by 1989. According to a MTQ proposal from 1982, Line 6 would have intersected the Orange Line (Line 2) at Du College and Sauve stations, and along with a planned transfer with the also-unbuilt Red Line, or Line 3, the line would have had 11 stations overall. Running along the northern part of the island, it would have passed through the districts of St. Laurent, Ahuntsic, Saint-Michel, Montreal-Nord, Riviere-des-Prairies and Pointe-aux-Trembles. Planned stations included elevated stops along viaducts, and others at ground level.

According to the MTQ, trains would have run every five minutes during rush hour and every fifteen minutes the rest of the day, at a top speed of 120 km/h (75 mph), approximately twice that of the underground Metro lines. Trains would have run in four-car sets during rush hour, and two cars the rest of the day.

Due to an economic slowdown in Montreal, the Line 6 proposal was abandoned in 1985. Unlike the unbuilt Lines 3 (Red) and 7 (White), Line 6 never advanced far enough in the planning process to receive a colour. The Mascouche line, opened in 2014 and operated by Exo, follows a similar route to the eastern portion of Line 6.

== List of planned stations ==
The following stations were planned for the line:

- Du Collège
- Côte-Vertu (planned transfer with Line 3 Red, not to be confused with the existing Côte-Vertu station on Line 2 Orange), now Montpellier on the REM
- De L'Acadie
- Sauvé
- Papineau
- Saint-Michel
- Pie-IX
- Viau
- Lacordaire-Langelier
- Armand-Bombardier
- Rodolphe-Forget
- Rivière-des-Prairies
- Pointe-aux-Trembles
