= Pie-IX =

Pope Pius IX was the longest-reigning pope of the Catholic church.

Pie-IX may also refer to:

- Pie-IX Boulevard, a thoroughfare in Montreal, Quebec
- Pie IX Bridge, a bridge connecting Montreal with Laval, Quebec
- Pie-IX (Montreal Metro), a rapid transit station on the Green Line of the Montreal Metro
- Pie-IX BRT, a bus rapid transit corridor on Pie-IX Boulevard in Montreal
- Pie IX, a song by Montreal band Suuns from their album Zeroes QC
