= Pie-IX BRT =

Bus rapid transit (BRT) corridor

Pie-IX bus rapid transit
- French: Service rapide par bus Pie-IX

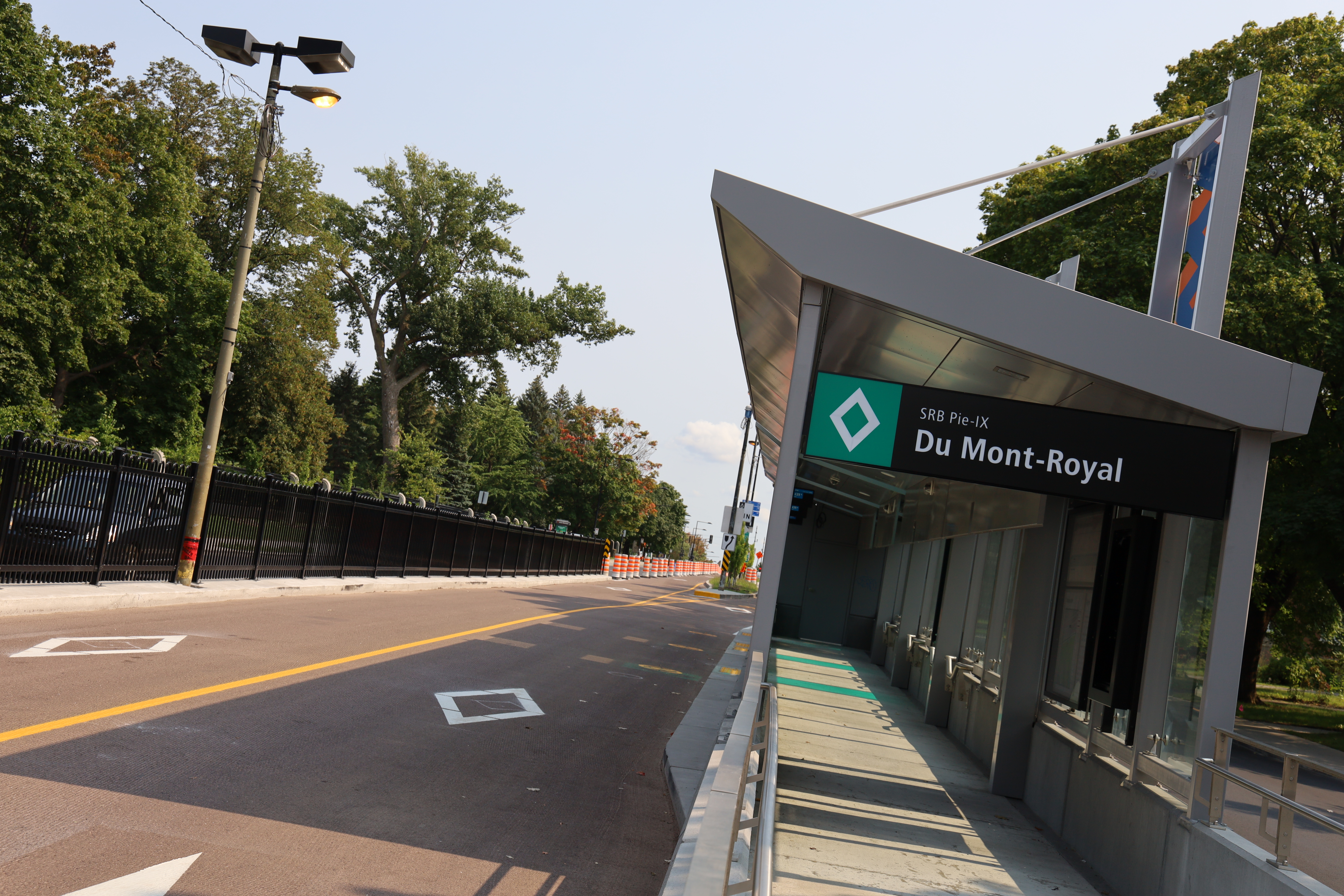
- Du Mont Royal station

Overview
- Operator: Société de transport de Montréal (STM)
- Vehicle: Nova Bus LFS Artic
- Began service: November 7, 2022
- Predecessors: 505 R-BUS Pie-IX (1989–2002)

Route
- Route type: Bus rapid transit
- Locale: Montreal and Laval, Quebec
- Start: Saint-Martin, Laval
- End: Pie-IX station (initial); Saint Catherine Street (planned)
- Length: 13 kilometres (8.1 mi)
- Stops: 20

Service
- Ridership: 7,651,839 (2025)
Route map
Pie-IX BRT highlighted in green
Key

The Pie-IX BRT is a bus rapid transit (BRT) corridor on Pie-IX Boulevard in Montreal between Saint Catherine Street in Hochelaga-Maisonneuve and Saint Martin in Laval. After four years of construction, the majority of Pie-IX BRT stations opened in November 2022, with the remaining opening in 2023. It is currently served by the 439 route, which is the busiest route in Montreal with 7,651,839 annual riders in 2025.

Historically, an express bus BRT-like service was available on Pie-IX Boulevard between 1990 and 2002 by the Société de transport de la communauté urbaine de Montréal (STCUM), until the system was abandoned due to safety concerns following deaths of pedestrians.

== Background ==
Bus rapid transit (BRT) uses reserved bus lanes, priority to buses at intersections, all door boarding and dedicated stations - allowing for higher capacity and reliability than a conventional bus system. In Quebec French, bus rapid transit is known as Service Rapide par Bus (SRB), whereas in other varieties of French, bus rapid transit is known as Bus à haut niveau de service (BHNS), literally 'Bus with a High Level of Service'.

== History ==
=== 505 R-BUS Pie-IX ===
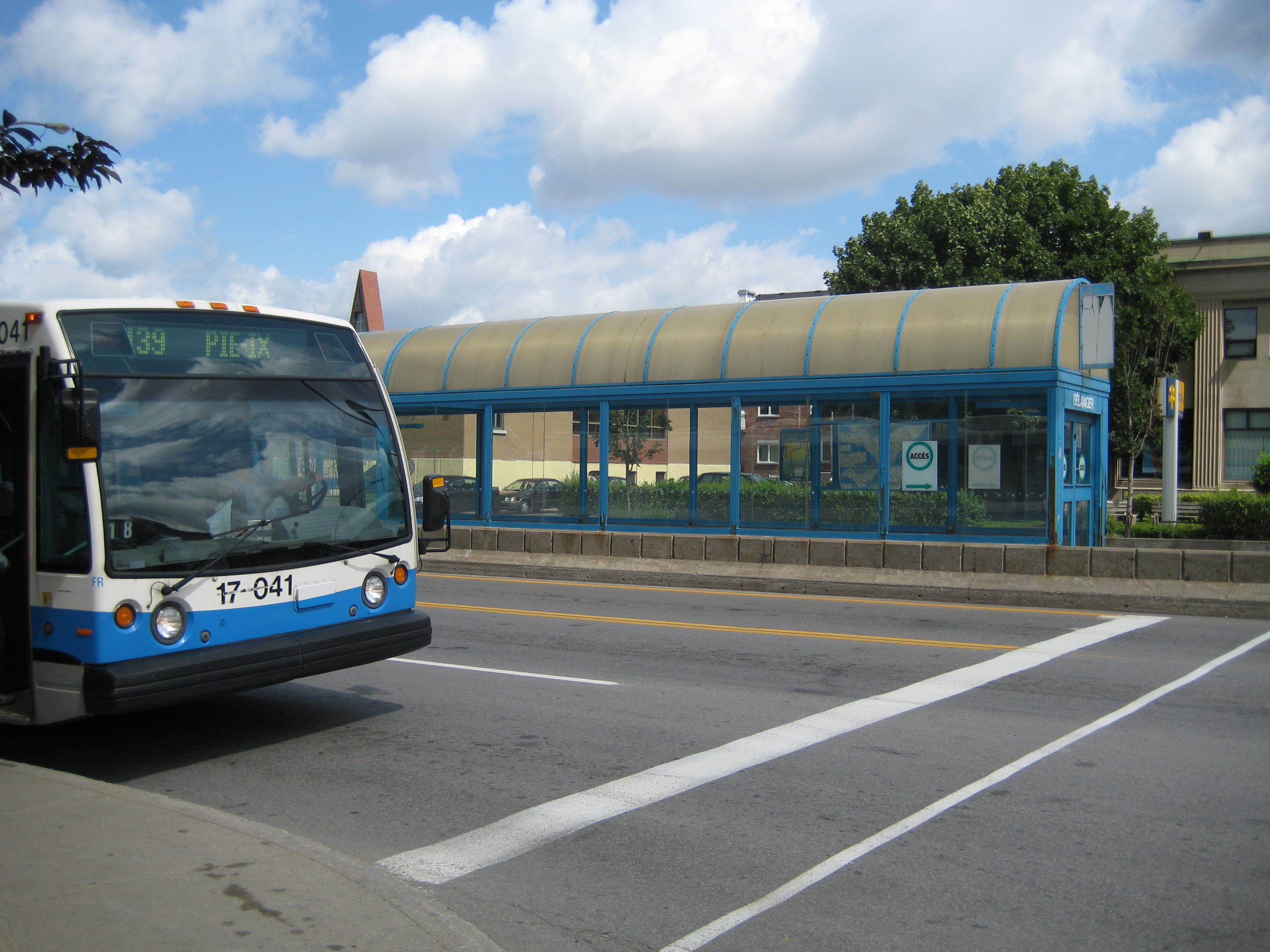
Old BRT shelter on Boulevard Pie-IX at Bélanger, now removed

The STCUM 505 R-BUS Pie-IX (Express Pie-IX), running along Boulevard Pie-IX, provided supplementary, limited-stop service to the 139 Pie-IX bus route during rush hours. It operated from 1990 to 2002, being the first reserved-lane bus service and first BRT service in Montreal. The system had 10 dedicated stations, and a regular stop and terminus at the Pie-IX metro station. A unique feature of the original Pie-IX BRT was the use of contraflow lanes with island platforms at dedicated stations, along with other BRT features such as high frequency of service and priority traffic signals. Ridership was relatively high, with STCUM reporting around 5,000 users a day.

However between 1997 and 2002, four pedestrians were fatally struck, as the layout of the bus lane was deemed too confusing and dangerous. After the fourth pedestrian fatality, service was suspended indefinitely in 2002, although a provisional curbside bus lane was set up in the boulevard's right lane. There were plans to restart the service once safety cones and fences are installed along Pie-IX Boulevard, but the relaunch did not occur. The stations were dismantled as of August 2010, to make way for the revised service system.

=== Pie-IX BRT ===
In 2007, the City of Montreal proposed a renewed bus rapid transit service on Pie-IX Boulevard as part of its transportation plan. The plan calls for BRT service along Pie-IX from Autoroute 440 in Laval to Notre-Dame Street in Hochelaga-Maisonneuve, continuing along Notre-Dame and René Lévesque Boulevard to offer an express link to Downtown Montreal. In 2009, the Agence métropolitaine de transport (AMT) regional transportation agency formally proposed the Pie-IX BRT to the provincial government, calling for frequent 24-hour service on bidirectional lanes in the central median between Autoroute 40 and Notre-Dame Street. The renewed BRT proposal called for side platforms at stops, eliminating the much-criticized contraflow design of the original lane.

Although the AMT planned for the Pie-IX BRT to begin operations in 2013, the project only received approval from the provincial government in 2015, with a tentative completion date of 2022. The approved project was less ambitious than the original proposal, calling only for the construction of bidirectional bus lanes and 15 BRT stops between Charleroi Street in Montréal-Nord and Pie-IX station in Hochelaga-Maisonneuve.

==== Construction ====
After the project was transferred to the Société de transport de Montréal (STM) in 2017, construction began in November 2018. Work began with the rebuilding of the underground utilities beneath the boulevard. It was also announced that the Pie-IX BRT would be extended after all to Saint-Martin in Laval, as the provincial government agreed to rebuild Pie IX Bridge to carry the bus lanes across the Rivière des Prairies. The total cost of the project was estimated to be $394 million. The southern portion cancelled in 2015 was restored in 2019 when the province announced that the Pie-IX BRT would be extended southward to Notre-Dame Street, with construction to begin in spring 2022 and end in fall 2023.

In 2022, it was announced that the launch of the Pie-IX BRT would be phased, with most of the service launching as planning in late 2022. The openings of Jean-Talon and Bélanger stations were pushed back to 2023 due to the construction of a pedestrian tunnel to better integrate the BRT service with the future Blue Line extension station. Pierre-De Coubertin station was also pushed back to 2023 due to construction delays. The overall cost of the project had increased to $472m.

==== Opening ====
After a formal opening by Mayor of Montreal Valérie Plante and Quebec Minister for Transport Geneviève Guilbault, the majority of stations opened on 7 November 2022, with 6 stations planned to open in 2023.

== Features ==
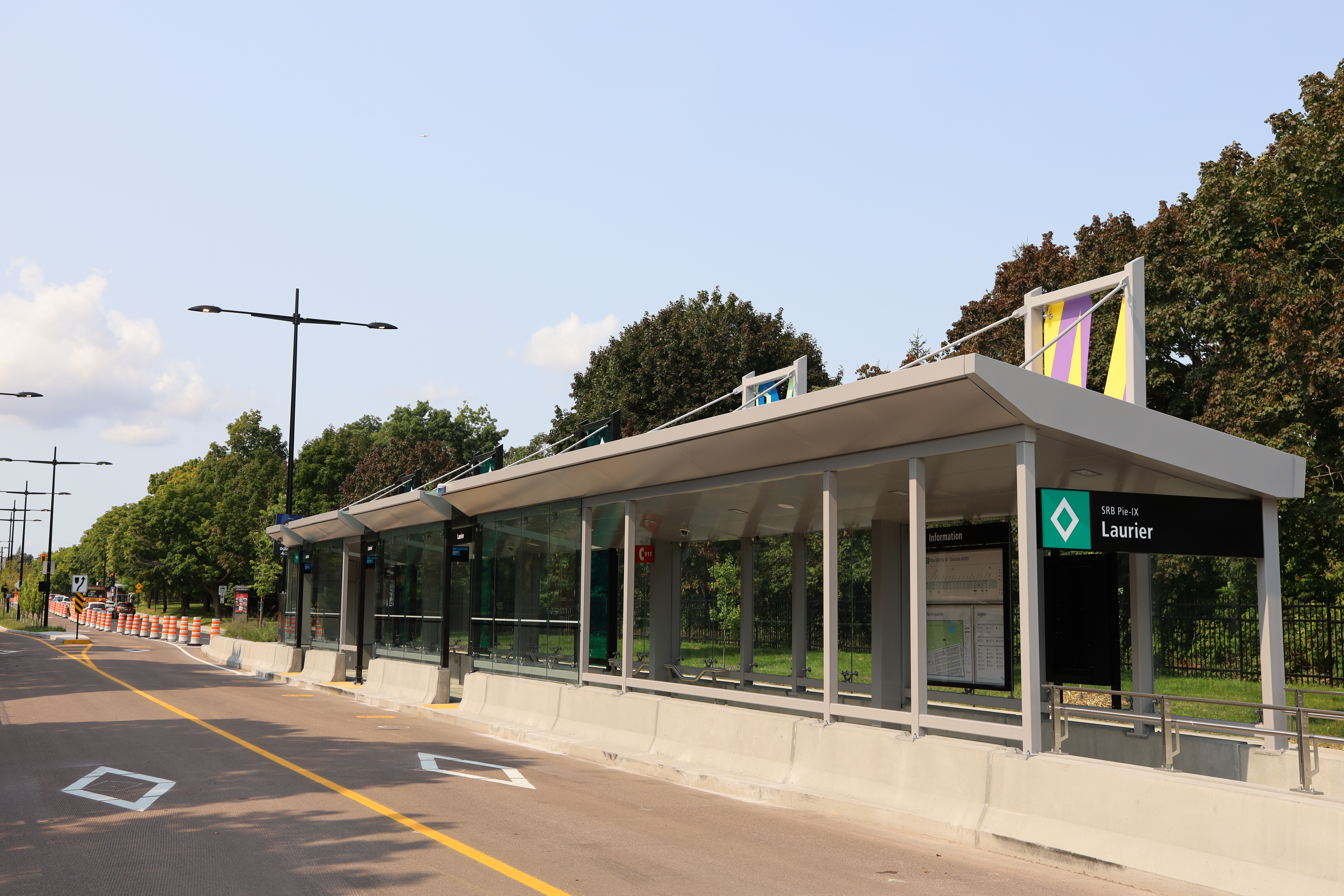
Laurier Pie-IX BRT station, showing the dedicated lanes

The Pie-IX bus rapid transit system includes many typical BRT features, which save an estimated 10 minutes from the bus travel time along Pie-IX Boulevard.

- Bus priority measures — The Pie-IX BRT have a dedicated right-of-way along a bidirectional, all-day central bus lane along its entire route from Saint-Martin to Notre-Dame Street along with traffic-signal priority measures at major intersections.
- Station infrastructure — Featuring platform-level boarding and dedicated stations, the Pie-IX BRT is fully-accessible and equipped with passenger shelters and countdown timers at all stops.
- All-door boarding — Unlike most buses in Montreal where boarding is only permitted through the front door, the Pie-IX BRT permits passengers to enter and exit through all doors to decrease the boarding time.

Additionally, work to replace municipal infrastructure such as sewer and water lines, as well as repaving roads and sidewalks took place. Extensive landscaping including tree planting also took place.

== Stations ==
Station	Opened / Opening	Connections	Locale
Saint Martin	November 7, 2022	ARTM: Saint-Martin Park and Ride Lot	Laval
Concorde	November 7, 2022		Laval
Pie IX Bridge over the Rivière des Prairies
Amos	November 7, 2022		Montréal-Nord
De Castille	November 7, 2022		Montréal-Nord
Fleury	November 7, 2022		Montréal-Nord
56e rue	November 7, 2022	Saint-Michel–Montréal-Nord station	Montréal-Nord
47e rue	November 7, 2022		Villeray–Saint-Michel–Parc-Extension
39e rue	November 7, 2022		Villeray–Saint-Michel–Parc-Extension
Robert	November 7, 2022		Villeray–Saint-Michel–Parc-Extension
Jarry	November 7, 2022		Villeray–Saint-Michel–Parc-Extension
A-40 Quebec Autoroute 40
Jean-Talon	December 18, 2023	Montreal Metro: Vertières Station	Villeray–Saint-Michel–Parc-Extension
Bélanger	December 18, 2023		Villeray–Saint-Michel–Parc-Extension
Bélanger	December 18, 2023		Rosemont–La Petite-Patrie
Beaubien	November 7, 2022		Rosemont–La Petite-Patrie
Rosemont	November 7, 2022		Rosemont–La Petite-Patrie
Laurier	November 7, 2022		Rosemont–La Petite-Patrie
Mont-Royal	November 7, 2022		Rosemont–La Petite-Patrie
Pierre-De Coubertin	2023	Montreal Metro: Pie-IX station	Hochelaga-Maisonneuve
De Rouen	2027		Hochelaga-Maisonneuve
Ontario	2027		Hochelaga-Maisonneuve
Sainte-Catherine	2027		Hochelaga-Maisonneuve

== Artwork ==
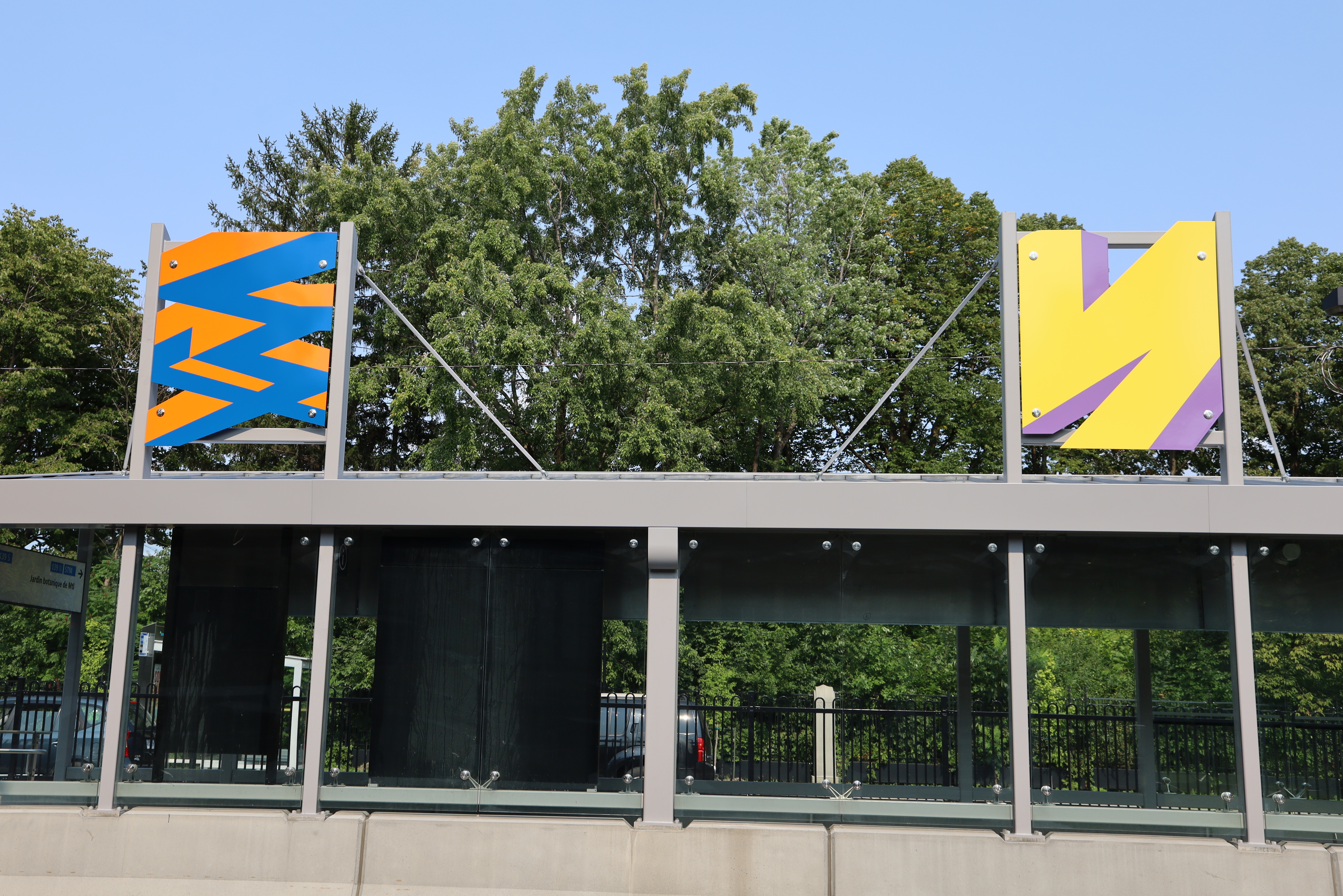
Kyrielle by Jean-Sébastien Denis

Owing to Quebec's percent for art programme, and following the example of the Montreal Metro, the Pie-IX BRT will have artwork at its stations. Kyrielle by Montreal born artist Jean-Sébastien Denis consists of painted aluminium in 70 different varieties, fixed to the Pie-IX BRT shelters. The patterns and colours of the aluminium evoke flags and other emblems.

== Most recent proposed plans ==
=== Pie-IX light rail ===
Rail service along Pie-IX Boulevard has been discussed on several occasions in the city's history. While an electric streetcar once existed on Pie-IX Boulevard, the service was withdrawn in the mid-20th century in favour of motor buses. Later, as part of the development of the Montreal Metro, a White Line was proposed beneath Pie-IX Boulevard, but the project never moved past the planning stage.

In the City of Montreal's 2007 Transportation Plan, Pie-IX is identified as a potential axis for light rail development. In response to calls for the Pie-IX bus rapid transit project to be converted to light rail, an ARTM spokesperson indicated in 2018 that the project had advanced too far and that it was too late to consider an alternative transit mode.

=== BRT expansion ===
The 2007 Transportation Plan that proposed the Pie-IX BRT also called for a five-kilometre BRT route along Henri Bourassa Boulevard to be built by 2018 at a cost of $25 million. However, this project did not advance further than the conceptual stage.

Ahead of the 2021 Montreal municipal election, Projet Montréal proposed as part of its successful bid for a second mandate to implement a "Metrobus" with characteristics similar to the Pie-IX BRT on Henri-Bourassa Boulevard. The line would extend from Du Ruisseau station on the Réseau express métropolitain to the proposed Montréal-Nord station on the REM de l'Est, with connections at Henri-Bourassa station on the Orange Line and Amos station on the Pie-IX BRT. The STM also commissioned a prefeasibility study exploring the implementation of three BRT lines on Henri-Bourassa Boulevard, Côte-des-Neiges Road and Park Avenue, with the final report due in 2023.

== See also ==
- Autorité régionale de transport métropolitain (ARTM)
- Société de transport de Montréal (STM)
- List of Société de transport de Montréal bus routes
- Ottawa Transitway
