= Saint-Michel–Montréal-Nord station =

Railway station in Montreal, Quebec, Canada

Saint-Michel–Montréal-Nord
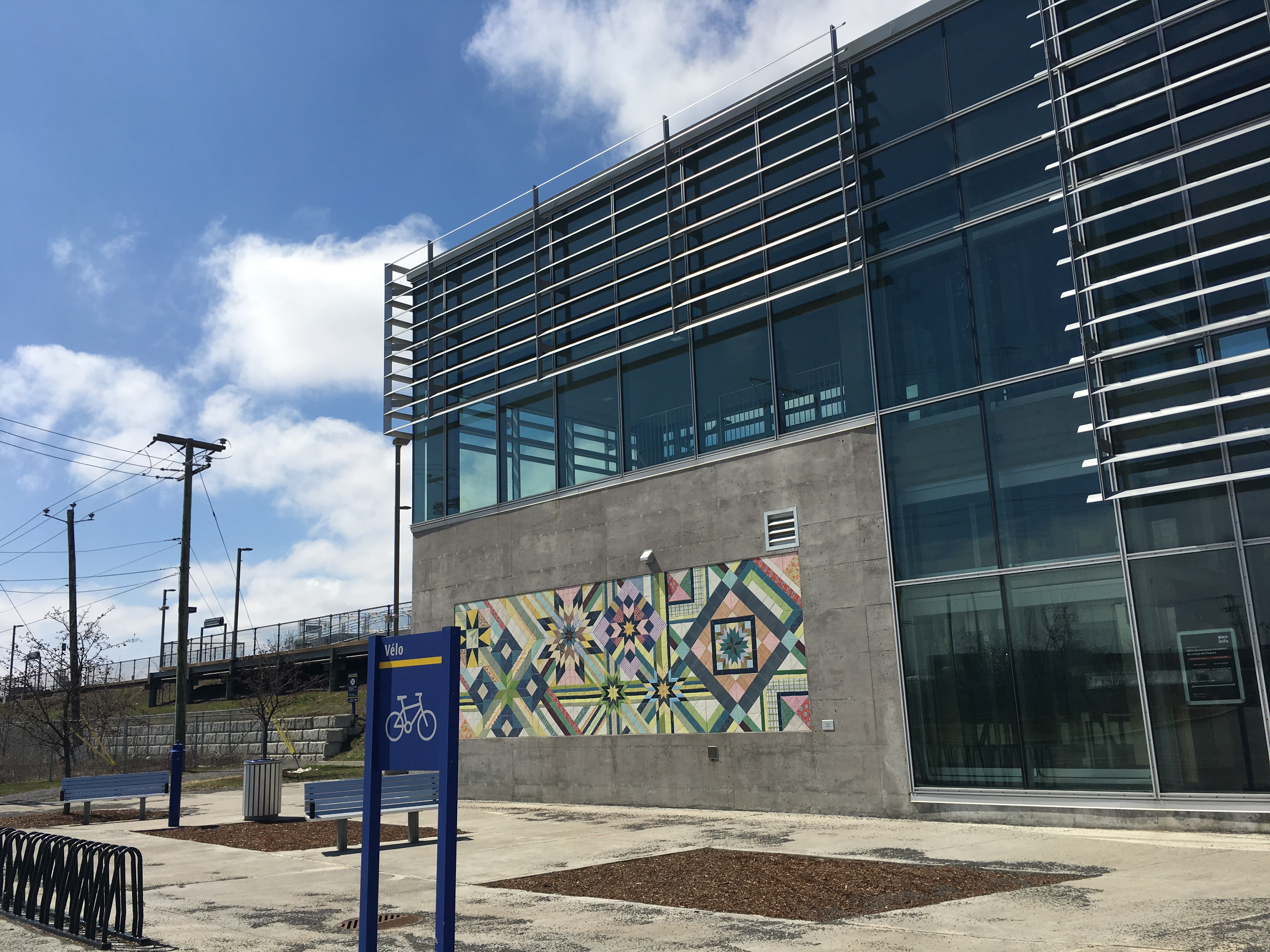

General information
- Location: 9990 Pie-IX Blvd. Montréal-Nord, Quebec H1H 3Z1; Canada
- Coordinates: 45°35′00″N 73°37′48″W
- Operator: Exo
- Platforms: 1 side platform
- Tracks: 1
- Connections: STM bus

Construction
- Parking: 130 Park-and-Ride (reserved), 4 Carpooling, and 5 Disabled spaces
- Cycle facilities: 95 spaces
- Accessible: Yes

Other information
- Fare zone: ARTM: A
- Website: Saint-Michel-Montreal-Nord (RTM)

History
- Opened: December 1, 2014

Passengers
- 2019: 94,600 (Exo)

Services
Preceding station	Exo	Following station
Saint-Léonard–Montréal-Nord toward Mascouche	Line 15 – Mascouche	Sauvé toward Côte-de-Liesse
Former services at Pie IX station
Preceding station	Canadian National Railway	Following station
St. Vital toward Montreal	Montreal – Rawdon; Local stops	Ste. Gertrude toward Rawdon
Location

Saint-Michel–Montréal-Nord station (French pronunciation: [sɛ̃ miʃɛl mɔ̃ʁeal nɔʁ]) is a commuter rail station operated by Exo in the borough of Montréal-Nord, in Montreal, Quebec, Canada. It is served by the Mascouche line.

The station is located immediately southwest of Boulevard Pie-IX, parallel to Boulevard Industriel. The station, built on an embankment, possesses a single track with a single low-level side platform on its southeast side. The platform is wheelchair accessible and features a raised wheelchair platform with a ramp to provide access to the trains.

The station has one headhouse, located at the northeastern end of the station on Boulevard Pie-IX. It provides stair and elevator access to platform 1 from the street and the adjacent kiss-and-ride loop. The southwestern end of the station has stair and ramp access to the station's parking lot.

A ceramic mural by Shelley Miller entitled Tissu urbain is located on the exterior wall of the headhouse, with smaller components inside.

As of November 7, 2022, the station offers a transfer to the 56e Rue station of the Pie-IX bus rapid transit line (bus route 439 Express Pie-IX).

== Connecting bus routes ==
Société de transport de Montréal
No.	Route	Connects to	Service times / notes
39	Des Grandes-Prairies	Pie-IX BRT	Weekdays only
41	Saint-Michel / Ahuntsic	Pie-IX BRT; Saint-Michel; Sauvé	Weekdays only
139	Pie-IX	Pie-IX BRT; Pie-IX	Daily
355 ☾	Pie-IX	Pie-IX; Frontenac; Bonaventure; Gare Centrale; Terminus Centre-ville; Lucien-L'Allier; Atwater	Night service
439	Express Pie-IX	Pie-IX	Daily Main route of the Pie-IX BRT Certain trips end at Saint-Martin Park and Ride in Laval and other at Cégep Marie-Victorin
440	Express Charleroi	Sauvé; Pie-IX BRT; Saint-Léonard-Montréal-Nord	Weekdays, peak only
