= Pie-IX Boulevard =

Boulevard in Montreal

Coordinates: 45°32′56″N 73°32′11″W

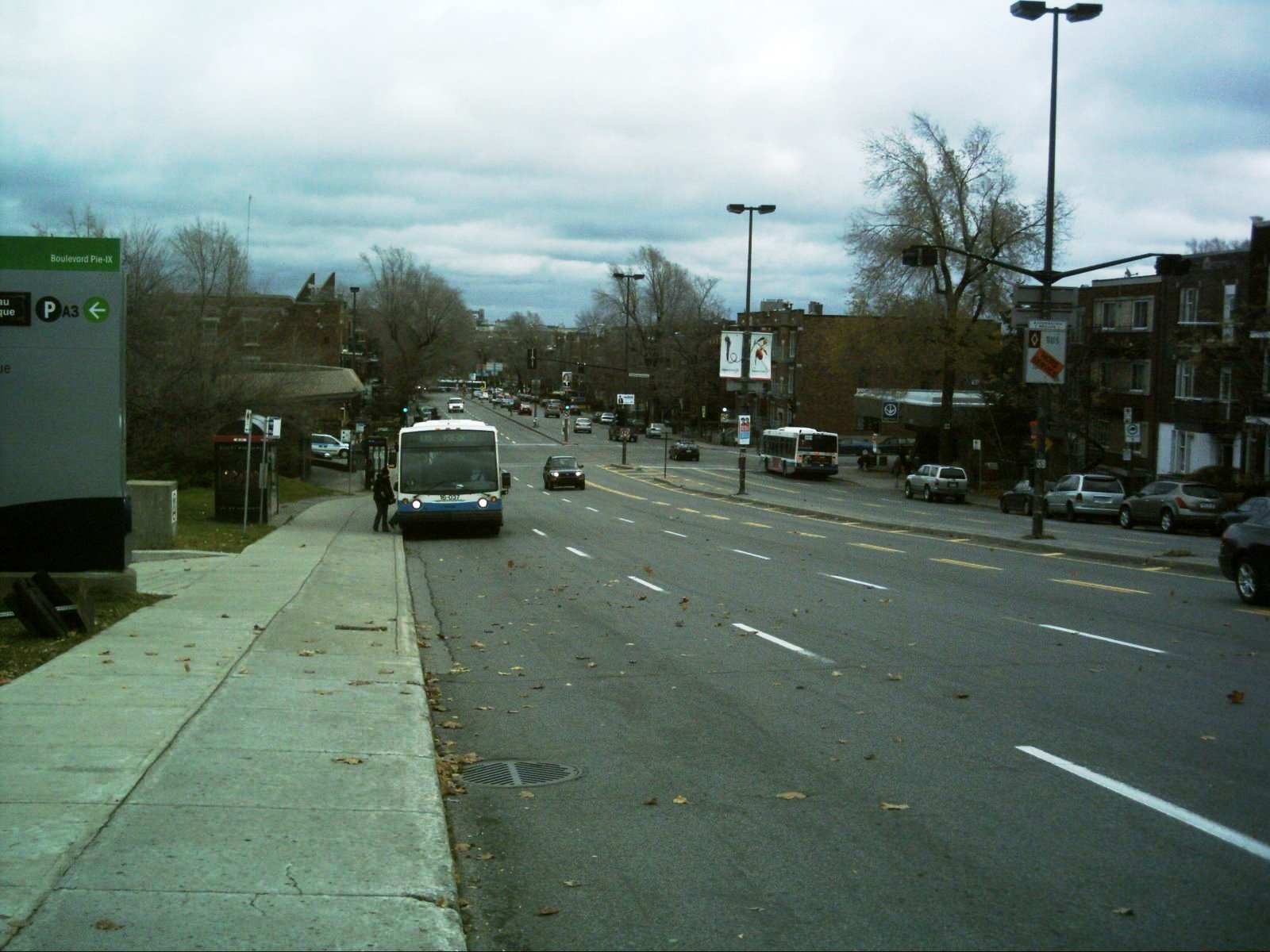
- Metro Pie-IX, looking south from Sherbrooke Street.
- Native name: boulevard Pie-IX (French)
- Part of: R-125
- Length: 11 km (6.8 mi)
- Location: Montreal, Quebec, Canada
- South end: Notre-Dame Street
- North end: Henri Bourassa Boulevard

Construction
- Inauguration: 1874

Pie-IX Boulevard (French: boulevard Pie-IX, pronounced [piˈnœf] in both English and French), named after Pope Pius IX, is a major boulevard in Montreal, Quebec, Canada. It runs for roughly 11 km (6.8 mi) in a northwest–southeast direction between Henri Bourassa Boulevard and Notre-Dame East. Pie-IX Boulevard runs past the Montreal Botanical Gardens and the Olympic Stadium. The boulevard forms part of Quebec Route 125.

It traverses the boroughs of Mercier–Hochelaga-Maisonneuve, Rosemont–La Petite-Patrie, Villeray–Saint-Michel–Parc-Extension and Montréal-Nord.

== Transit ==
Pie-IX metro station is located on and named for the street.

The boulevard is serviced by the 139 Pie-IX regular service bus, and the BRT reserved bus lane 439 bus.

The Montréal-Nord commuter rail station is located on Pie-IX Boulevard.

=== Pie-IX BRT ===
After an initial attempt in the 1990s, a bus rapid transit (BRT) opened on November 7, 2022. Currently, the BRT runs from Saint-Martin in Laval to Pie-IX and Mont-Royal in Rosemont-La-Petite-Patrie. The Jean-Talon and Bélanger stations are under construction that includes a transfer to a new unnamed station on the Blue Line.

== See also ==
- Pie IX Bridge
