= Pie-IX station =

Montreal Metro station

Pie-IX
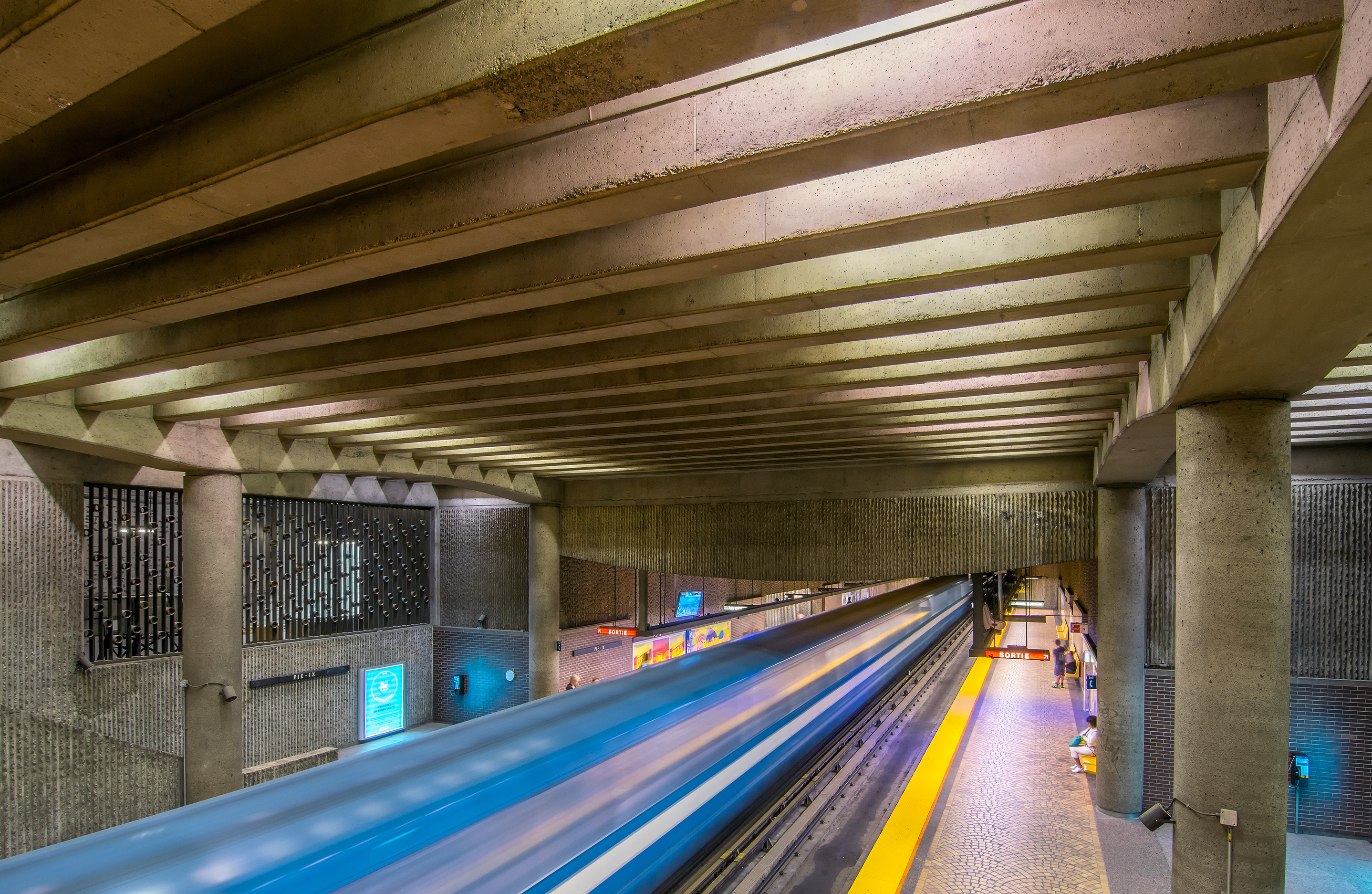

General information
- Location: 2700 and 2705 Pie-IX Boulevard; Montreal, Quebec H1V 3P1; Canada
- Coordinates: 45°33′14″N 73°33′06″W
- Operator: Société de transport de Montréal
- Platforms: 2 side platforms
- Tracks: 2
- Connections: STM bus

Construction
- Depth: 10.1 metres (33 feet 2 inches), 53rd deepest
- Accessible: Yes
- Architect: Marcel Raby

Other information
- Fare zone: ARTM: A

History
- Opened: 6 June 1976
- Rebuilt: 2020-22 (both entrances)

Passengers
- 2024: 4,560,429 ▲9.75%
- Rank: 19 of 68

Services
Preceding station	Montreal Metro	Following station
Joliette toward Angrignon	Green Line	Viau toward Honoré-Beaugrand
Location

Pie-IX station (French pronunciation: [pinœf]) is a Montreal Metro station in the borough of Mercier–Hochelaga-Maisonneuve in Montreal, Quebec, Canada. It is operated by the Société de transport de Montréal (STM) and serves the Green Line. The station opened in June 1976, in time for the 1976 Summer Olympics - as the station serves the Olympic Stadium and the Olympic Park. Since November 7, 2022, the station is connected to the Pie-IX BRT.

== Overview ==
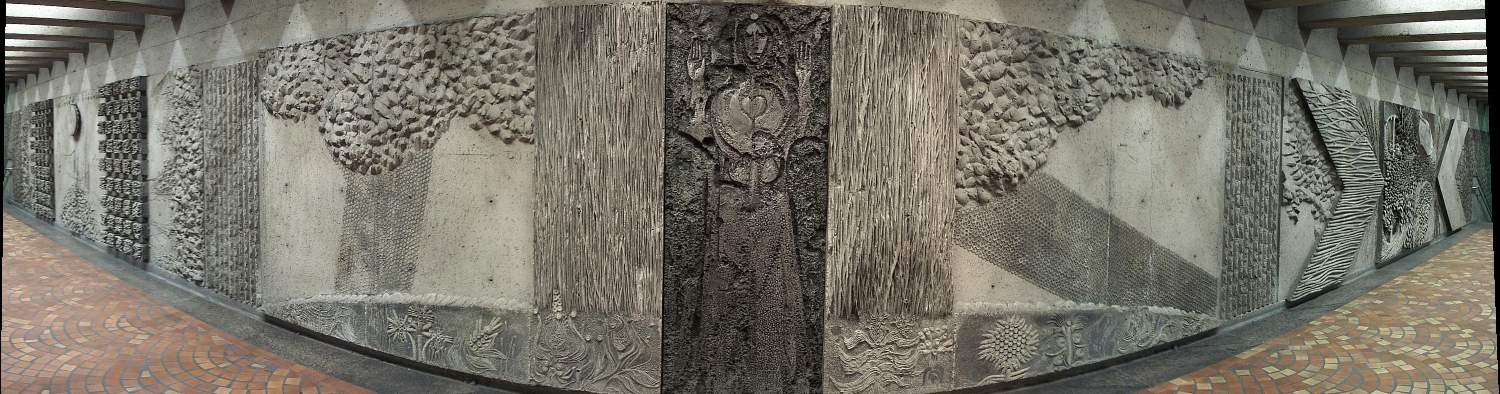
Citius, Altius, Fortius, a relief by Jordi Bonet.

The station opened on June 6, 1976, as part of the extension of the Green Line to Honoré-Beaugrand station, in time for the 1976 Summer Olympics.

Designed by architect Marcel Raby, the station was built in open cut. The centre of the station is taken up with a vast mezzanine bisected by a long ticket barrier. This space, as well as a secondary access to the Angrignon platform, allows the station to handle very large crowds from the Olympic Stadium. The mezzanine gives direct underground city access to the Stadium. The station has two exits of its own, one incorporated into the stadium's parvis, and another across the street.

=== Accessibility ===
In 2020, work began to make the station universally accessible at a cost of $81m. The work included the installation of four elevators, widened staircases, as well as extensive station renovation. The project was completed in November 2022, making Pie-IX the Metro's 22nd accessible station.

== Artwork ==
The station includes four Olympic-themed works of art: three sculptures by the architect Marcel Raby featuring different takes on the Olympic rings, and one long mural in concrete and aluminium by Jordi Bonet entitled Citius, Altius, Fortius ("stronger, higher, faster" - the motto of the Olympic Games).

As part of the work to make the station accessible, an artwork by Francis Montillau was installed in spring 2023.

== Origin of the name ==
This station is named for Pie-IX Boulevard (pronounced pee neuf). This street was named in 1912 for Pope Pius IX (1792–1878), elected Pope in 1846.

== Connections ==
Since November 7, 2022, the station is connected to the Pie-IX BRT at Pierre-De Coubertin Boulevard. Unlike other BRT stops on Pie-IX Boulevard, the Pierre-De Coubertin stop is located curb-side for easy access to and from the Metro station.

=== Connecting bus routes ===
Société de transport de Montréal
No.	Route	Connects to	Service times / notes
97	Avenue-du-Mont-Royal	Mont-Royal; Pie-IX BRT	Daily
139	Pie-IX	Pie-IX BRT; Saint-Michel-Montréal-Nord	Daily
355 ☾	Pie-IX	Saint-Michel-Montréal-Nord; Frontenac; Bonaventure; Gare Centrale; Terminus Centre-ville; Lucien-L'Allier; Atwater	Night service
439	Express Pie-IX	Saint-Michel-Montréal-Nord	Daily Main route of the Pie-IX BRT. Certain trips end at Saint-Martin Park and Ride in Laval and other at Cégep Marie-Victorin

== Nearby points of interest ==
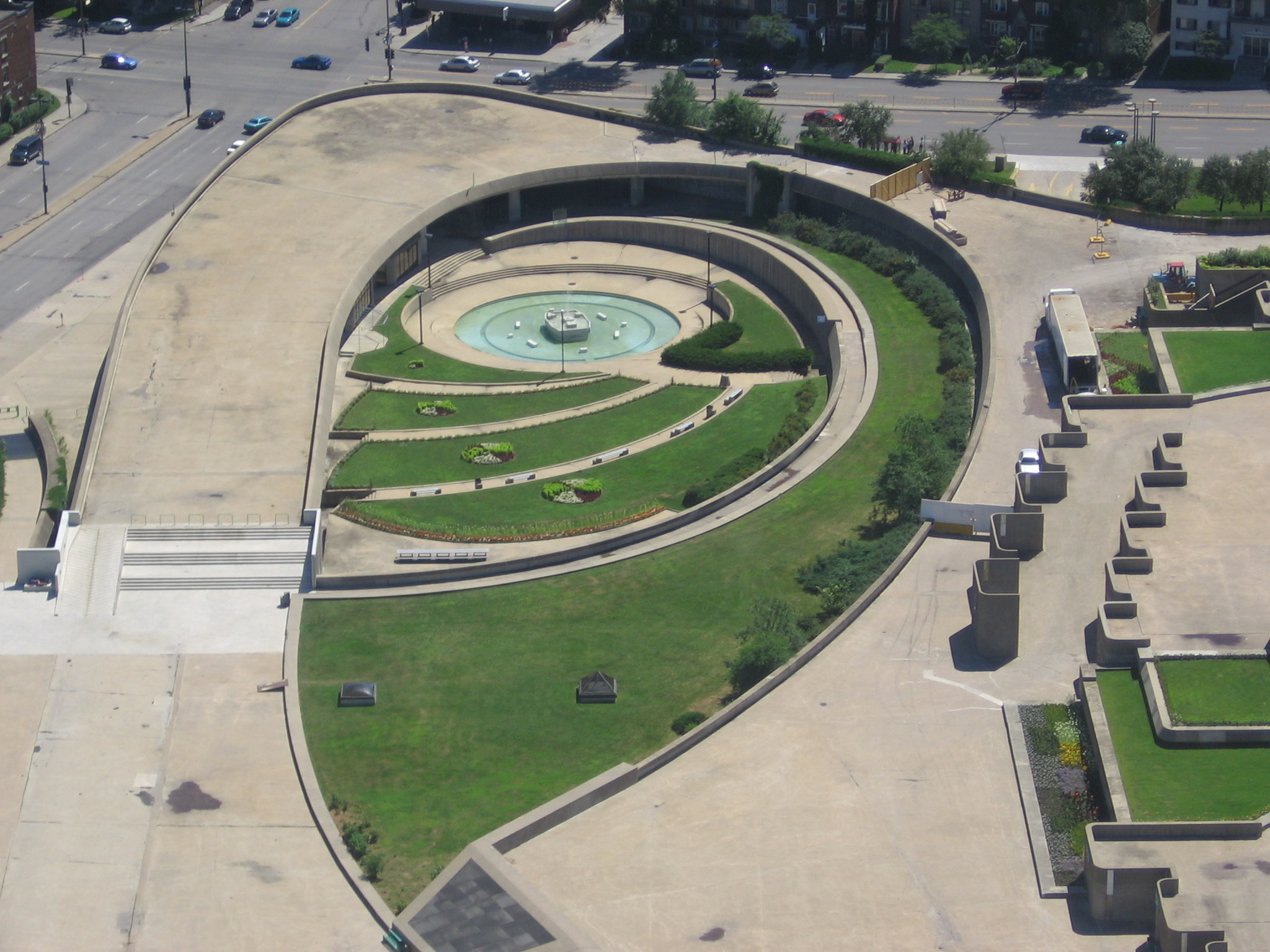
Pie-IX station from the viewpoint of Olympic Stadium

- Olympic Park
- Olympic Stadium
- Biodome
- Rio Tinto Alcan Planetarium
- Montreal Botanical Garden
- Château Dufresne - Musée des arts décoratifs de Montréal
- Collège de Maisonneuve
- Olympic Village
