= Olympic Stadium (Montreal) =

Stadium in Montreal, Quebec, Canada

- Stade olympique
- The Big O The Big Owe
- Aerial view of Olympic Stadium and the surrounding Olympic complex, 2026.

- Location in Montreal Location in Quebec Location in Canada
- Address: 4545 Pierre-de-Coubertin Avenue
- Location: Montreal, Quebec, Canada
- Coordinates: 45.558°N 73.552°W
- Owner: Régie des installations olympiques, Government of Quebec
- Capacity: Permanent capacity: 56,040 (1992–present); 1976 Summer Olympics: 73,000 (1976–1992); Baseball: 49,757 (1992–present); Soccer: 61,004; Football: 66,308
- Roof: Dome
- Surface: Grass (1976 and June 2, 2010); AstroTurf (1977–2001, 2005–06); Defargo Astrograss (2002–03); FieldTurf (2003–2005); Team Pro EF RD (2007–2014); Xtreme Turf by Act Global (2014–2022); FIFA Quality Pro (2023–)
- Record attendance: 78,322 (Pink Floyd, July 6, 1977)
- Field size: Foul Lines: 99 metres (325 ft) (1977), 101 metres (330 ft) (1981), 99 metres (325 ft) (1983); Power Alleys: 114 metres (375 ft); Centre Field: 123 metres (404 ft) (1977), 123 metres (405 ft) (1979), 123 metres (404 ft) (1980), 122 metres (400 ft) (1981), 123 metres (404 ft) (1983); Backstop: 19 metres (62 ft) (1977), 20 metres (65 ft) (1983), 16 metres (53 ft) (1989)
- Public transit: Pie-IX, Viau

Construction
- Groundbreaking: April 28, 1973
- Opened: July 17, 1976; April 15, 1977 (baseball)
- Cost: C$ 770 million C$ 5.2 billion (2017 – including additional costs, interest and repairs for the entire Olympic Park)
- Architect: Roger Taillibert

Tenants
- Montreal Expos (MLB) (1977–2004); Montreal Alouettes/Concordes (CFL) (1976–86, 1996–97, part-time 1998–2013); Montreal Manic (NASL) (1981–83); Montreal Machine (WLAF) (1991–92); CF Montréal (MLS) (2012–present, select games)

Website
- Parc Olympique Website

Olympic Stadium (French: Stade olympique, pronounced [stad ɔlɛ̃pik]) is a multi-purpose stadium in Montreal, Canada, located at Olympic Park in the Hochelaga-Maisonneuve district of the city. Built in the mid-1970s as the main venue for the 1976 Summer Olympics, it is nicknamed "The Big O", a reference to both its name and to the doughnut-shape of the permanent component of the stadium's roof. It is also disparagingly referred to as "The Big Owe" in reference to the high cost of its construction and of hosting the 1976 Olympics as a whole.

The stadium is one of the largest by seating capacity in Canada. After the Olympics, artificial turf was installed and it became the home of Montreal's professional baseball and football teams. The Montreal Alouettes of the CFL returned to their previous home of Molson Stadium in 1998 for regular season games, but continued to use Olympic Stadium for playoff and Grey Cup games until 2012. Following the 2004 baseball season, the Expos relocated to Washington, D.C., to become the Washington Nationals. The stadium currently serves as a multi-purpose facility for special events (e.g. concerts, trade shows) with a permanent seating capacity of 56,040. The capacity is expandable with temporary seating. CF Montréal (formerly known as Montreal Impact) of Major League Soccer (MLS) has used the venue when demand for tickets justifies the large capacity or when the weather restricts outdoor play at nearby Saputo Stadium in the spring months.

The stadium has not had a main tenant since the Expos left in 2004. Despite decades of use, the stadium's history of numerous structural and financial problems has largely branded it as a white elephant.

Incorporated into the north base of the stadium, inclined at 45°, and not completed until a full decade after the stadium's opening, is the Montreal Tower. At 165 metres (541 ft), it is the world's tallest inclined tower. The stadium and Olympic Park grounds border Maisonneuve Park, which includes the Montreal Botanical Garden, adjacent to the west across Sherbrooke Street (Route 138).

== History ==
=== Background and architecture ===
As early as 1963, Montreal Mayor Jean Drapeau sought to build a covered stadium in Montreal. A covered stadium was thought to be all but essential for Drapeau's other goal of bringing a Major League Baseball team to Montreal, given the cold weather that can affect the city in April, October and sometimes even September. In 1967, soon after the National League granted Montreal an expansion franchise for 1969, Drapeau wrote a letter promising that any prospective Montreal team would be playing in a covered stadium by 1971. However, even though Quebec mayors have broad executive power, Drapeau could not make such a guarantee on his own authority. Just as Charles Bronfman, who was slated to become the franchise's first owner, was ready to walk away, Drapeau had his staffers draw up a proposal for a stadium. It was enough to persuade Bronfman to continue with the effort.

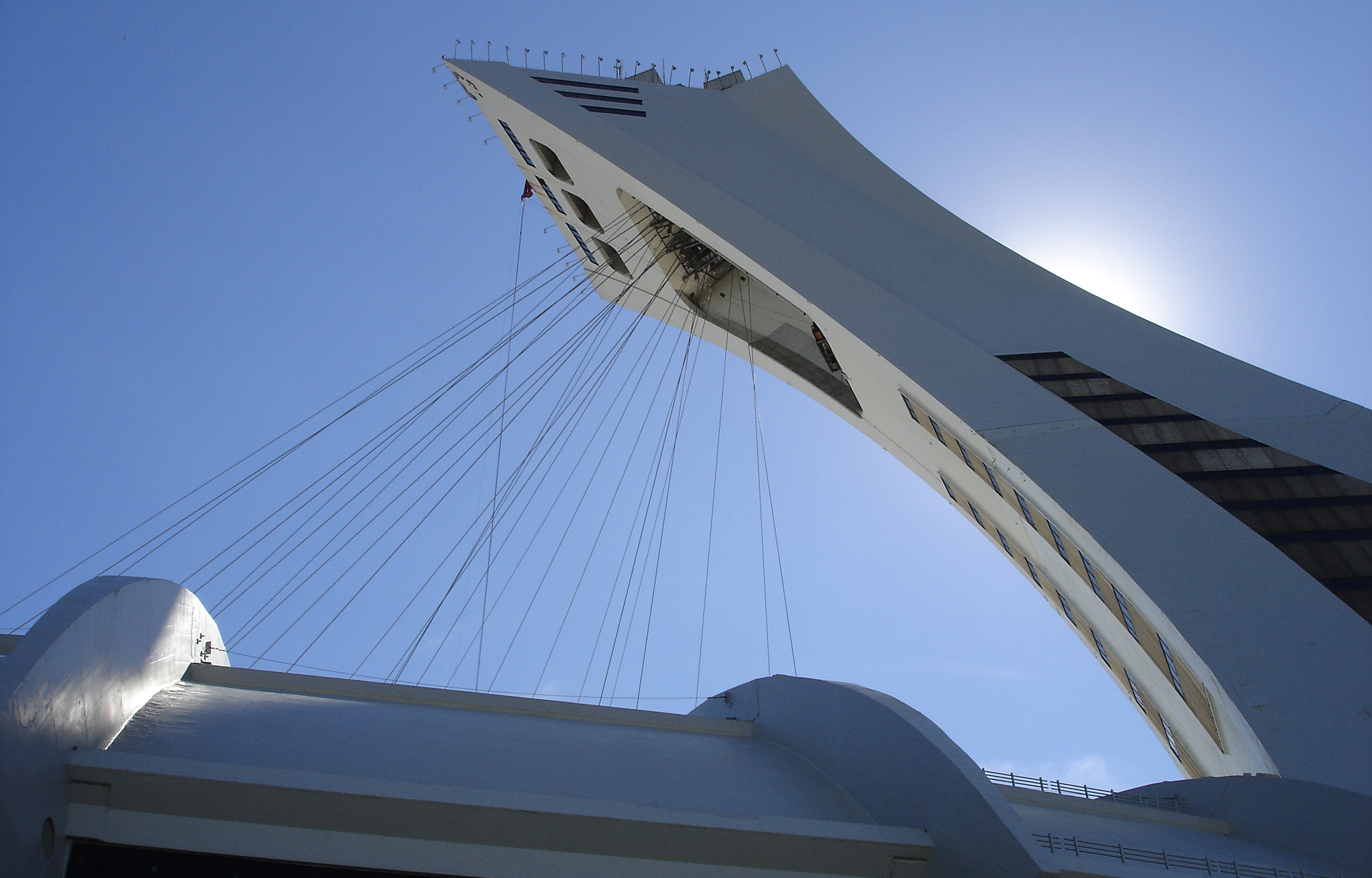
Tower with cables for retractable roof

The stadium was designed by French architect Roger Taillibert to be an elaborate facility featuring a retractable roof, which was to be opened and closed by cables suspended from a huge 165-metre (541 ft) tower – the tallest inclined structure in the world, and the tenth tallest structure in Montreal. The design of the stadium has been likened to that of the Australian Pavilion at Expo '70 in Osaka, Japan, although Taillibert had previously explored the concept of an umbrella-style roof for a theatre in Cannes (1964) and Piscine Carnot in Paris (1967). Soon after Montreal was awarded the 1976 Games, Drapeau struck a secret deal with Taillibert to build the stadium. It only came to light in 1972.

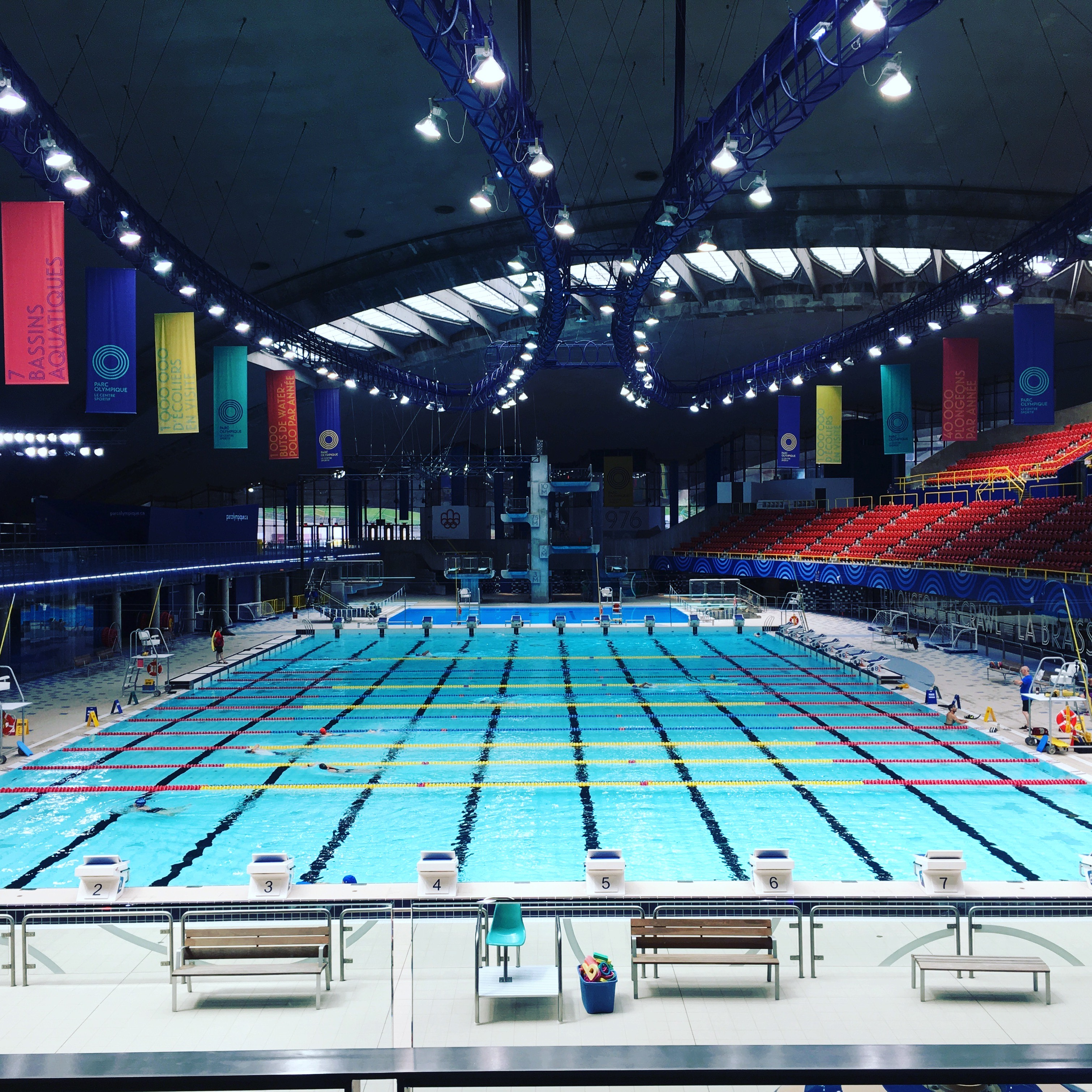
The 1976 Montreal Olympic Swimming Pool on July 25, 2017

The Olympic swimming pool is located under this tower. An Olympic velodrome (since converted to the Montreal Biodome, an indoor nature museum) was situated at the base of the tower in a building similar in design to the swimming pool. The building was built as the main stadium for the 1976 Summer Olympic Games. The stadium was host to various events including the opening and closing ceremonies, athletics, football finals, and the team jumping equestrian events.

The building's design is cited as a masterpiece of Organic Modern architecture. Taillibert based the building on plant and animal forms, aiming to include vertebral structures with sinews or tentacles, while still following the basic plans of Modern architecture.

=== Construction ===
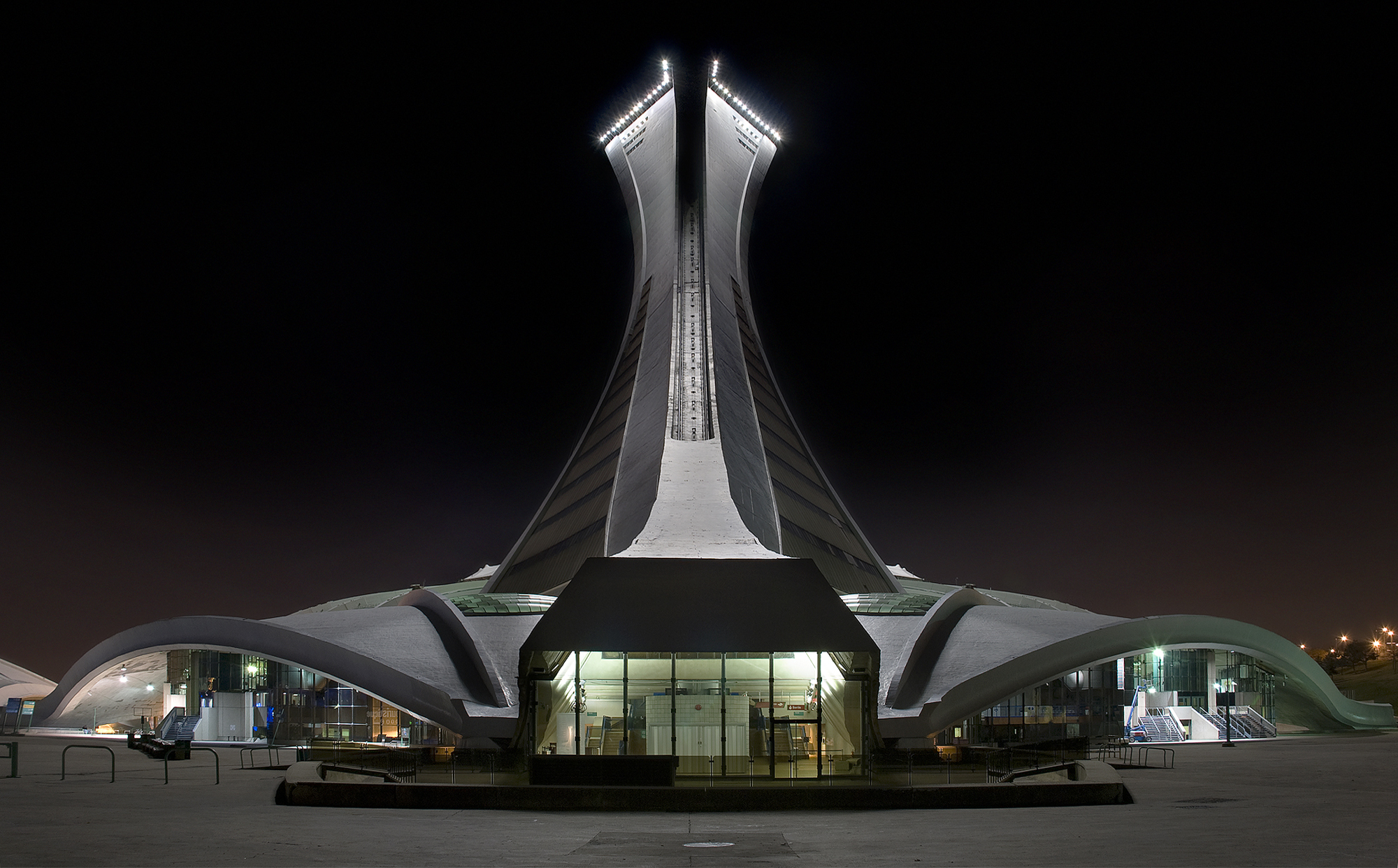
Back view at night

The stadium was originally slated to be finished in 1972, but the grand opening was cancelled due to a strike by construction workers. The Conseil des métiers de la construction union headed by André "Dédé" Desjardins kept the construction site in "anarchic disorder" until the Quebec Premier Robert Bourassa bought him off in a secret deal. In his 2000 book Notre Cher Stade Olympique, Taillibert wrote "If the Olympic Games took place, it was thanks to Dédé Desjardins. What irony!" Further delays ensued due to the stadium's unusual design and Taillibert's unwillingness to back down from his original vision of the stadium even in the face of escalating costs for raw materials. It did not help that the original project manager, Trudeau et Associés, seemed to be incapable of handling some of the most basic construction tasks. In 1974, the Quebec provincial government lost patience with the delays and cost overruns and fired Taillibert from the project.

Additionally, the project was plagued by circumstances beyond anyone's control. Work slowed to a snail's pace for a third of the year due to Montreal's typically brutal winters. As a result, the stadium and tower remained unfinished at the opening of the 1976 Olympic Games.

The roof materials languished in a warehouse in Marseille until 1982, and the tower and roof were not completed until 1987. It would be another year before the 66-tonne, 5,500 m^{2} (59,000 sq ft) Kevlar roof (designed and built by Lavalin) could retract. Even then, it could not be used in winds above 40 km/h (25 mph). Ultimately, it was only opened and closed 88 times.

=== Observatory ===
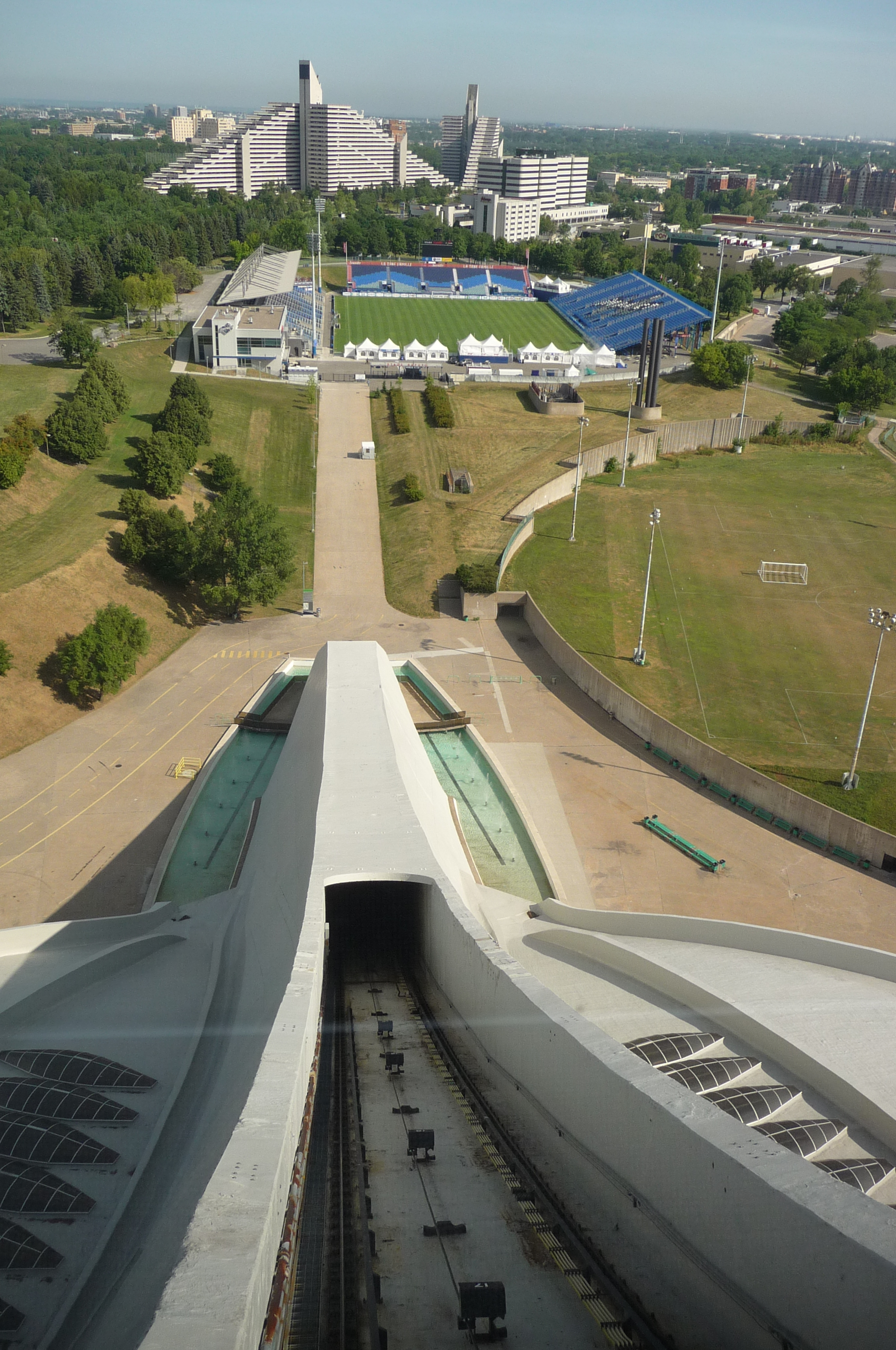
North-east view from elevator lower deck compartment

When construction on the stadium's tower resumed after the 1976 Olympics, a multi-storey observatory was added to the plan, accessible via an inclined elevator, opened in 1987, that travels 266 metres (873 ft) along the curved tower's spine. The elevator cabin ascends from base of the tower to the upper deck in less than two minutes at a rate of 2.8 m/s (6.3 mph), with space for 76 persons per trip and a capacity of 500 persons per hour. The cabin is designed to remain level throughout its trip, while providing a panoramic view to its passengers.

The elevator faces north-east, offering a view to the north, south and east. It overlooks the Olympic Village, the Biodome, the Botanical Gardens and Saputo Stadium. The Olympic Park, the stadium's suspended roof and downtown Montreal can be viewed from the south-west-facing Observatory at the top of the tower.

=== Stadium financing ===
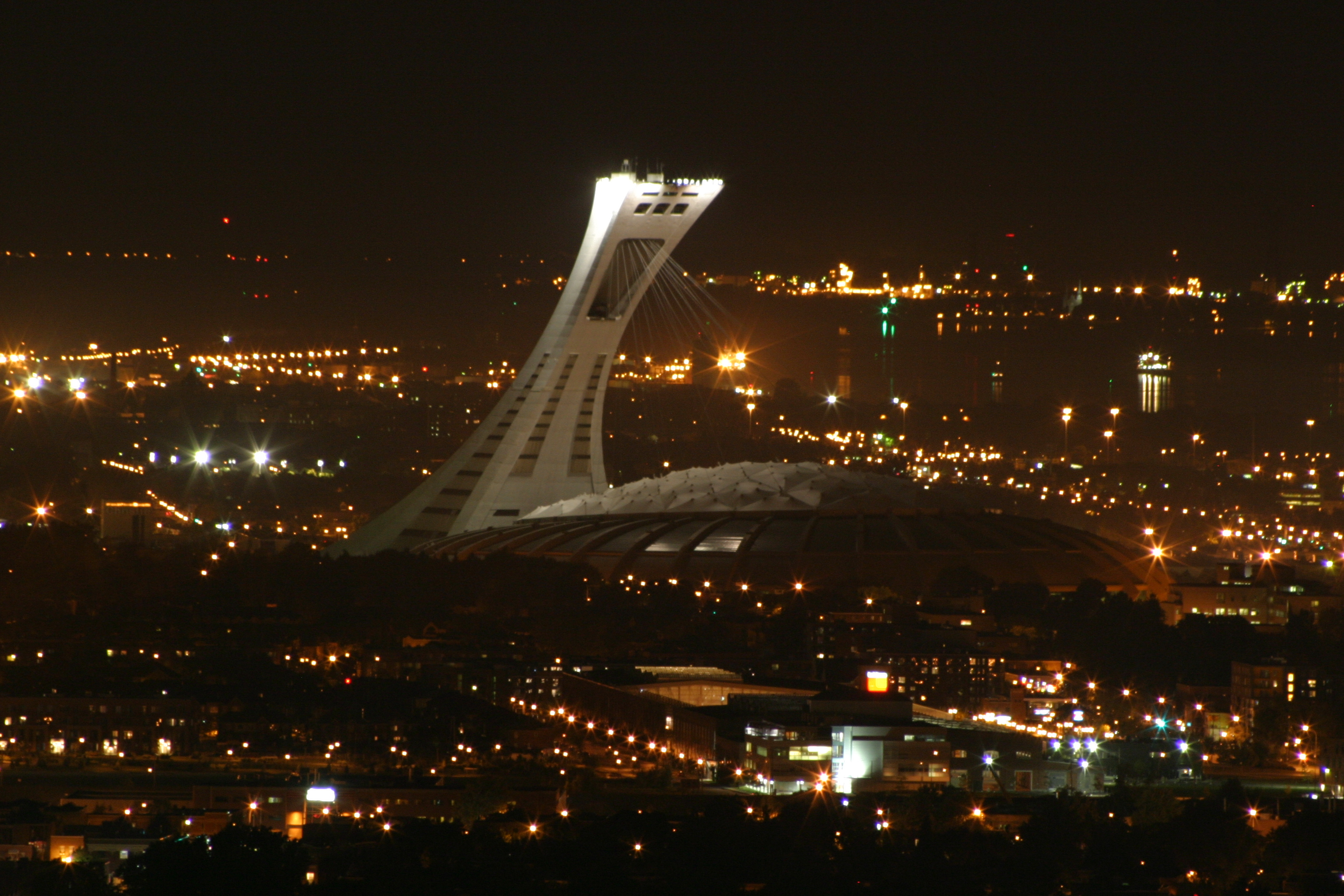
Aerial view at night

Despite initial projections in 1970 that the stadium would cost only CA$134,000,000 (equivalent to $1,083,881,773 in 2025) to construct, strikes and construction delays served to escalate these costs. By the time the stadium opened (in an unfinished form), the total costs had risen to CA$1,100,000,000 (equivalent to $5,807,717,042 in 2025).

The Quebec government introduced a special tobacco tax in May 1976 to help recoup its investment. By 2006, the amount contributed to the stadium's owner, the Olympic Installations Board (OIB) (fr: Régie des Installations Olympiques), accounted for 8% of the tax revenue earned from cigarette sales. The 1976 special tobacco tax act stipulated that once the stadium was paid off, ownership of the facility would be returned to the City of Montreal.

In mid-November 2006, the stadium's costs were finally paid in full, more than 30 years after it opened. The total expenditure (including repairs, renovations, construction, interest, and inflation) amounted to C$1.61 billion, making it—at the time all costs were paid off—the second most expensive stadium built (after Wembley Stadium in London). Despite initial plans to complete payment in October 2006, an indoor smoking ban introduced in May 2006 curtailed the revenue gathered by the tobacco tax. By 2014, the stadium's expense ranking had fallen to fifth, with the construction of costlier venues like MetLife Stadium, AT&T Stadium, and the new Yankee Stadium. Perceived by many to be a white elephant, the stadium has also been dubbed The Big Owe due to its astronomical cost.

The stadium has generated on average CA$20 million in revenue each year since 1977. It is estimated that a large-scale event such as the Grey Cup can generate as much as $50 million in revenue.

=== Continuing problems ===
Although the tower and retractable roof were not completed in time for the 1976 Olympics, construction on the tower resumed in the 1980s. During this period, however, a large fire set the tower ablaze, causing damage and forcing a scheduled Expos home game to be postponed. In 1986, a large chunk of the tower fell onto the playing field prior to another Expos game August 29 vs. San Diego Padres forcing a doubleheader on August 30.

In January 1985, approval was given by the Quebec government to complete the project and install a retractable roof, financed by an Olympic cigarette tax in the province. The tower construction and installation of the orange-coloured Kevlar roof were completed by April 1987, a decade later than planned. The roof experienced numerous rips, allowing rain to leak into the stadium.

As part of various renovations made in 1991 to improve the stadium's suitability as a baseball venue, 12,000 seats were eliminated, most of them in distant portions of the outfield, and home plate was moved closer to the stands.

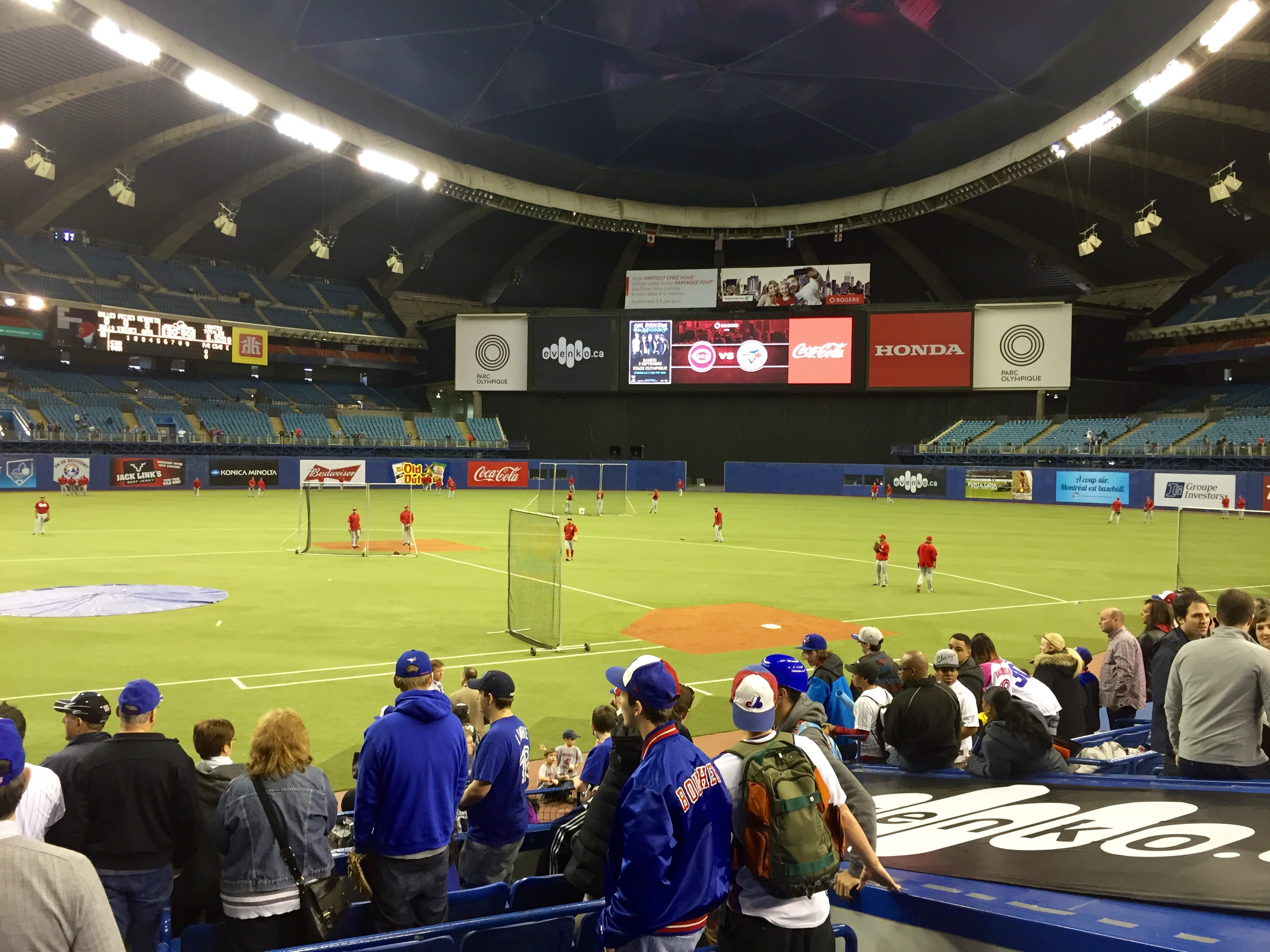
Olympic Stadium's blue roof and new scoreboard installed in 2015

On September 8 of that year, support beams snapped and caused a 55-long-ton (62-short-ton; 56 t) concrete slab to fall onto an exterior walkway. No one was injured, but the Expos had to move their final 13 home games of that season to the opponents' cities. The Expos hinted that the 1992 season was at risk unless the stadium was certified safe. In early November, engineers found the stadium was structurally sound. However, it took longer to certify the roof as safe because it had been badly ripped in a June windstorm. For the 1992 season, it was decided to keep the roof closed at all times. The Kevlar roof was removed in May 1998, making the stadium open-air for the 1998 season. Later in 1998, a $26 million non-retractable opaque blue roof was installed.

In 1999, a 350 m^{2} (3,770 sq ft) portion of the roof collapsed on January 18, dumping ice and snow on workers that were setting up for the annual Montreal Auto Show. The auto show and a boat show the following month were cancelled, and the auto show left the venue for good (since then, the Montreal Auto Show has usually been held at the Palais des congrès de Montréal). Repaired once again, the roof was modified to better withstand winter conditions: the OIB installed a network of pipes to circulate heated water under the roof to allow for snow melting. Despite these corrective measures, the stadium floor remained closed from December to March. Birdair, the fabric provider and designer of the roof, was later sued for the roof failure. The installer of the roof, Danny's Construction, having suffered tremendous cost overruns along with its subcontractor Montacier, due to changes in the plans and specifications and delays, was terminated during the construction, and Birdair completed the project. Danny's Construction sued Birdair in 1999. In February 2010, after a lengthy trial, the Quebec Superior Court awarded a judgement in favour of Danny's Construction and dismissed Birdair's countersuit.

The stadium's condition suffered considerably in the early 21st century. During the Expos' final years in Montreal, it was coated with grime, and much of the concrete was chipped, stained, and soiled.

=== Plans for a third roof ===
In 2009, the stadium received approval to remain open in the winter, provided weather conditions are favourable. However, the Olympic Installations Board issued a report stating that the roof was unsafe during heavy rainfall or more than 8 centimetres (3.1 in) of snow, and that it rips 50 to 60 times a year. The city fire department warned in August 2009 that without corrective measures, including a new roof, it may order the stadium closed. Events cannot be held if more than 3 centimetres (1.2 in) of snow are predicted 24 hours in advance, such as caused postponement of the Montreal Impact home opener soccer match in March 2014. A contract for a new permanent steel roof was awarded in 2004, with an estimated CA$300 million price tag. In June 2010, the Olympic Installations Board sought approval from the provincial government for the contract. In May 2011 a committee was formed to study the future of the stadium and improve the usage of the stadium, pool, and sports centre.

A slab of concrete measuring approximately 8 by 12 metres (26 by 39 ft) fell from the roof of the stadium's underground parking facility on March 4, 2012. There were no injuries. The roof continues to deteriorate, with 7,453 tears as of May 2017, limiting use of the venue in winter to when there are three or fewer centimetres of snow on the roof.

In 2015, a new high definition scoreboard was installed, replacing the aging two-panel display dating back to the stadium's renovations in 1992.

In November 2017, the Quebec government approved a new roof, estimated to cost CA$250 million. The new roof was then planned to be removable, allowing the stadium to either be open-air or enclosed, consistent with the intent of the original roof. The option of a removable portion of the roof has since been removed from the scope of the project.

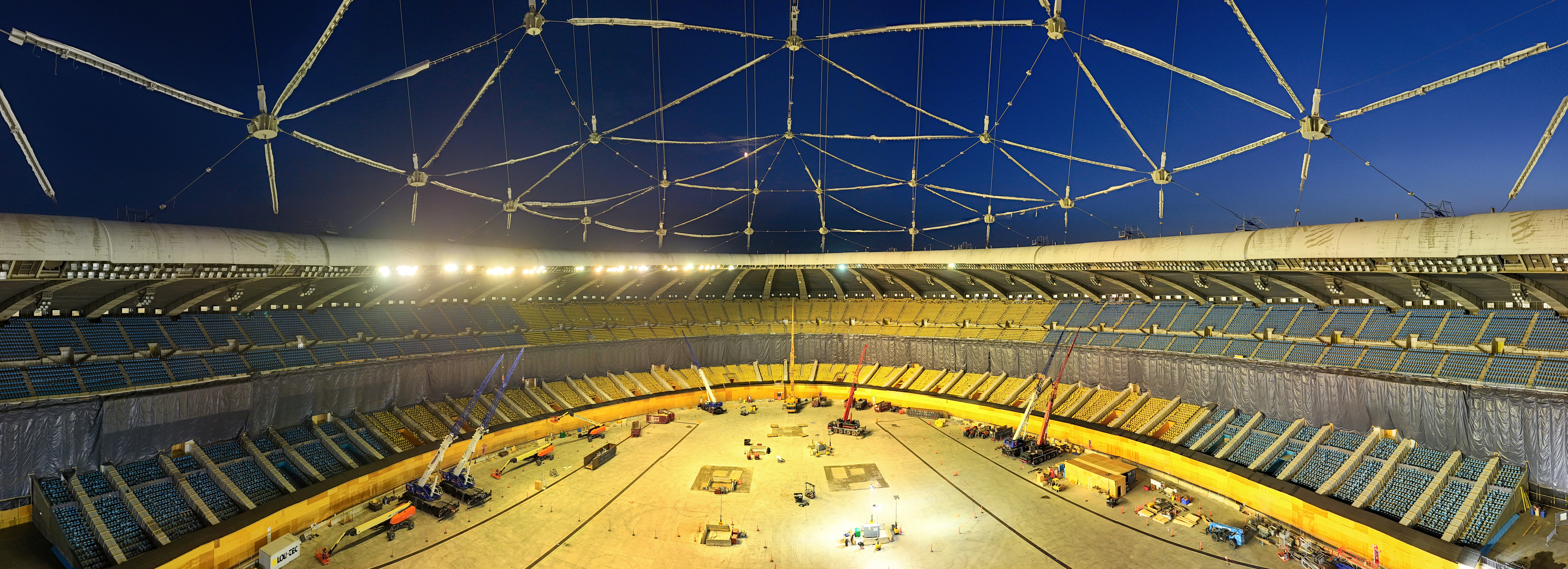
Inside the stadium during renovation work, 2024

The Olympic Installations Board has estimated the cost of demolishing the stadium would be between CA$500 and $700 million, though this figure is based on a preliminary two-month study and thus has a high margin of error. The high cost of demolition is due to the stadium being built of pre-stressed concrete, which rules out a controlled implosion or wrecking ball, and instead would require carefully removing the rebar wire which is under tension.

In February 2024, Quebec Tourism Minister Caroline Proulx announced that the expected cost of the new roof had increased to CA$870 million. She said the new roof will take four years to construct, and is expected to last for 50 years. She said demolition of the stadium is "unthinkable" and not an option, for multiple reasons: the structure is an icon of Quebec, Montreal's Metro runs directly beneath the stadium, multiple businesses lease space in the office tower, and demolition would cost an estimated CA$2 billion. However, Le Journal de Montréal reported that the number was inflated, and demolition would cost only a small fraction of that amount. In addition, they reported that the cited cost for the new roof did not include hundreds of millions of dollars in additional work necessary to correct acoustics and remodel seats and restrooms.

=== Interior Renovations ===
In July 2026, the Quebec government gave the green light to the Olympic Park to proceed with the stadium's long rumored modernization project. The work is scheduled for completion by 2028, the year already planned for the stadium's reopening.

The new configuration will have the stands in the lower bowl be reconfigured into a rectangular shape, to encircle a field for Canadian football and soccer use. The seats will be moved approximately 30 meters from the playing surface on each side. Premium spaces and boxes will also be added to increase revenue.

The new configuration should allow for a capacity of 50,000.

== Post-Olympic use ==
=== Gridiron football ===
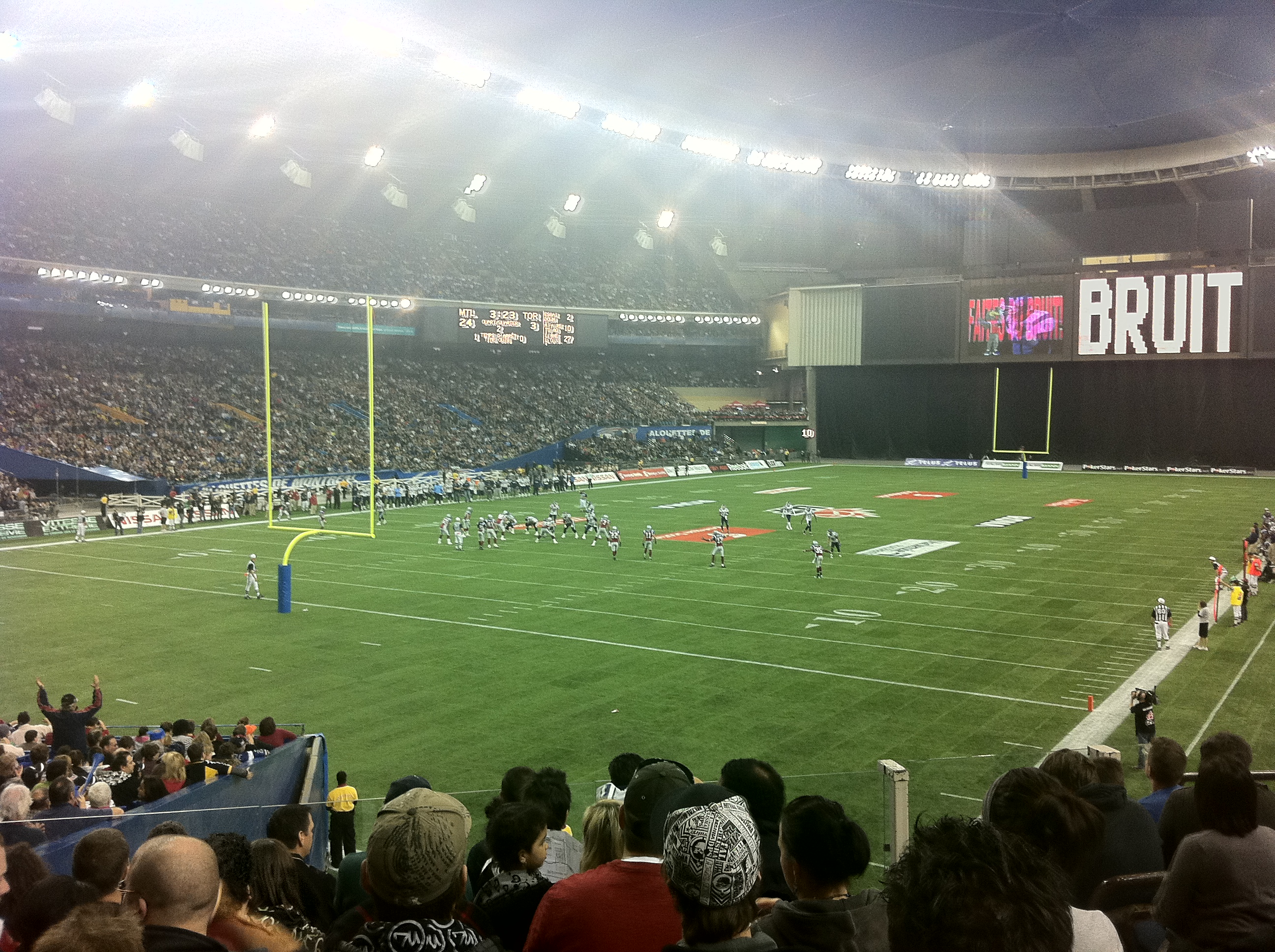
The Alouettes in action in 2010

The Canadian Football League's Montreal Alouettes became the stadium's first major post-Olympic tenant when they moved their home games there halfway through the 1976 season. Capacity was reduced from its Olympic capacity of 72,000 to 58,500, but leapt to 66,308 when the natural grass was replaced with AstroTurf ahead of the 1977 season. The Alouettes remained there through 1986, the franchise's final season of operations; the team would shut down shortly after the start of the 1987 season. A revived Alouettes franchise returned for the 1996 and 1997 seasons, but then moved to the Percival Molson Stadium in 1998. The Alouettes used Olympic Stadium for select regular season games until 2009, and playoff games until 2012. Due to the increased popularity of the Alouettes and the small capacity of Percival Molson Stadium, the team considered returning to Olympic Stadium on a full-time basis, but instead renovated Percival Molson Stadium to increase its capacity. In addition, the stadium holds the record for the largest Grey Cup attendance, that of the 1977 Grey Cup game, in which the hometown Montreal Alouettes defeated the Edmonton Eskimos, 41-6 before 68,318 spectators; this despite a local transit strike and harsh winter weather conditions.

Olympic Stadium has hosted the Grey Cup a total of six times, most recently in 2008 when the Calgary Stampeders defeated the hometown Alouettes. The stadium holds the record for nine of the ten largest crowds in CFL history, which include five regular-season and four Grey Cup games. A single-game record crowd numbering 69,083 attended a game played on September 6, 1977, between the Alouettes and Toronto Argonauts.

In 1991 and 1992, the stadium was the home of the Montreal Machine of the World League of American Football. This included hosting World Bowl '92 on June 6, 1992, in which the Sacramento Surge defeated the Orlando Thunder 21–17 before 43,789.

In 1988 (Jets and Browns) and 1990 (Steelers and Patriots), NFL pre-season games were played at Olympic Stadium.

=== Baseball ===
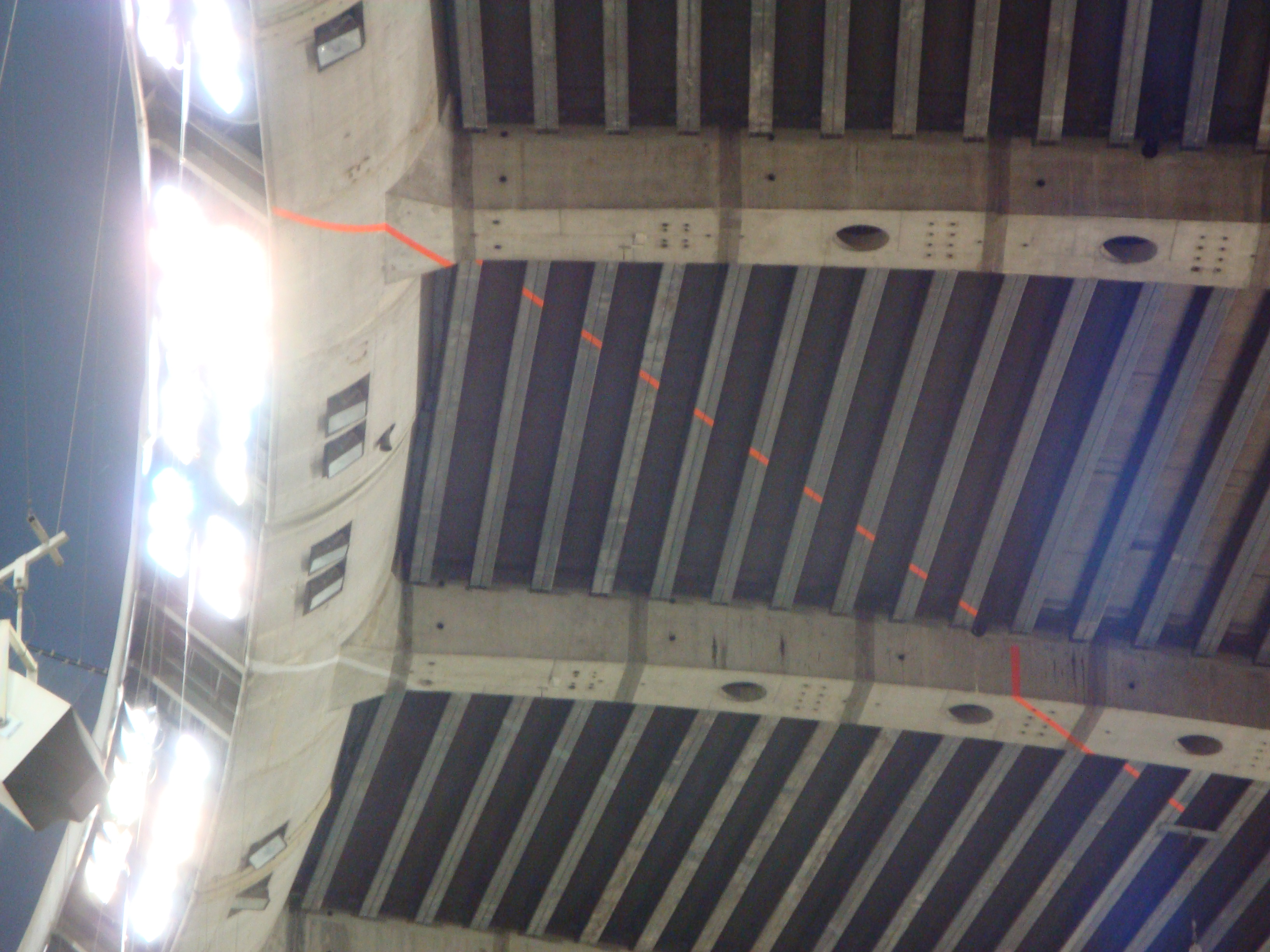
Detail of the roof including the foul lines

In 1977, the stadium replaced Jarry Park Stadium as the home ballpark of the National League's Montreal Expos. As a part of the team's franchise grant, a domed stadium was supposed to be in place for the 1972 baseball season. However, due to the delays in constructing Olympic Stadium, until 1977, the Expos annually sought and received a waiver to remain at Jarry. As late as January 1977, it was thought the Expos would have to play at least part of the 1977 season at Jarry as well. The Parti Québécois' landslide victory in the 1976 provincial elections caused the Expos to break off lease talks. However, an agreement was reached in February, and an official announcement came in March.

The Expos regularly played 81 home games every season until 2003, when they played 22 home games in Puerto Rico at Hiram Bithorn Stadium in San Juan. The Expos played 59 home games at Olympic Stadium in each of their final two seasons of 2003 and 2004; the franchise moved south to Washington, D.C. for the 2005 season and became the Washington Nationals.

Olympic Stadium's first baseball game was played on April 15, 1977. In front of 57,592, the Expos lost 7–2 to the Philadelphia Phillies. However, the Expos had to use a hacksaw to cut open the locks because the OIB did not have a master key. The Expos played five home playoff games in 1981; two in the NLDS against the Phillies, and three in the NLCS against the Los Angeles Dodgers, who went on to win the World Series. On October 19, the Expos lost the decisive fifth game, 2–1, to the Dodgers on Rick Monday's ninth-inning home run. These were the only playoff games ever played at the stadium, as the Expos did not make the playoffs again during their time in Montreal. In 1982, the Major League Baseball All-Star Game was played at Olympic Stadium in front of 59,057—a stadium record for baseball. On September 29, 2004, the Expos played their last game in Montreal, losing 9–1 to the Florida Marlins before 31,395.

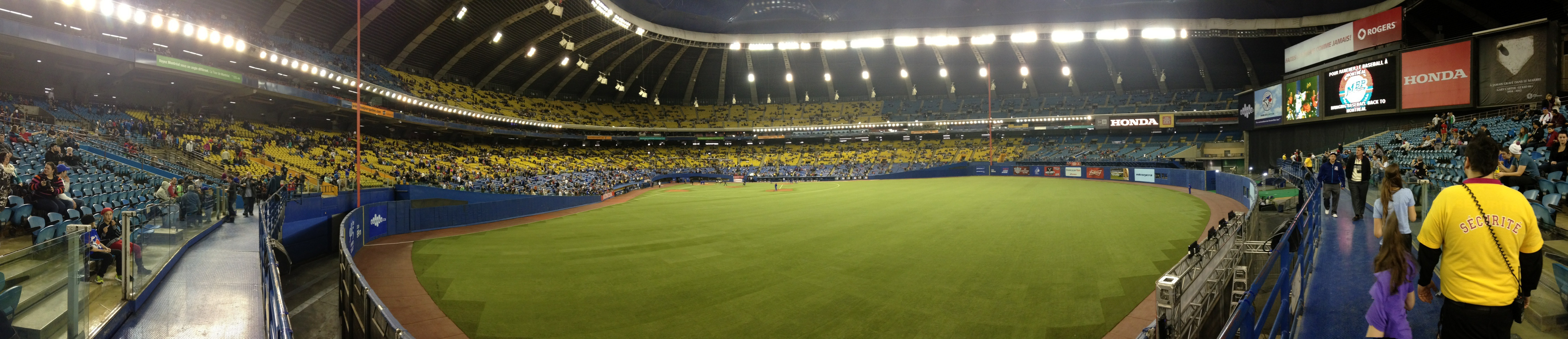
Olympic Stadium panoramic during an MLB preseason game in 2014

Olympic Stadium proved to be somewhat problematic as a baseball venue. As in all multipurpose stadiums, the lower seating tier was set further back than in baseball-specific parks to accommodate the football field. However, since Canadian football fields are longer and wider than American football fields, Olympic Stadium's lower tier was set back even further than comparable seats at American multipurpose stadiums. The upper deck was one of the highest in the majors; as was the case with most of its multipurpose counterparts, most of the upper-deck seats, particularly those in the outfield, were too far away to be of any use during the regular season.

The Expos were not consulted on the stadium's location, design, or construction even though they were slated to be its primary tenants. Nonetheless, for most of their tenure they put considerable effort into making the atmosphere friendlier for baseball. During the 1970s and early 1980s, fans arriving at the stadium from the Metro were greeted by an oom-pah band playing "The Happy Wanderer." Whenever an opposing pitcher tried to hold a runner at first rather than pitch, the sound system would cluck at him like a chicken.

Before the 1991 season, the OIB began a major overhaul on the stadium's baseball configuration. The lower deck in centre field was removed to make room for a larger scoreboard with replay capability. That scoreboard was installed ahead of the 1992 season. Also ahead of the 1992 season, the running track was removed, home plate was moved closer to the stands and new seats closer to the field were installed. Several distant sections of permanent seating beyond the outfield fence were closed, replaced with bleacher seats directly behind the fence. The total seating capacity for baseball was reduced from a high of around 60,400 to 46,000.

The Expos were very successful in the stadium for a time, with above National League median attendance in 1977 and from 1979 to 1983. The Expos outdrew the New York Mets from 1977 to 1983, and 1994 to 1996, as well as the New York Yankees in 1982 and 1983.

The stadium's playing conditions left much to be desired. For most of the Expos' tenure, the playing surface was an extremely thin AstroTurf carpet, with only equally thin padding between it and the concrete floor. It was so hard on players' knees that visiting teams frequently ran at a nearby park. Longtime Expos trainer Ron McClain begged for a replacement, but the OIB was unwilling to spend the $1 million needed for a new surface. Before the roof finally arrived, players had to contend with huge patches of ice in early April or late September. Additionally, for most of the Expos' tenure, the padding on the fence was so thin that fielders risked severe injury by going after long fly balls. However, the OIB was also unwilling to replace the padding. By the 1990s, several free agents specifically demanded that the Expos be taken out of consideration due to the poor playing conditions.

By the mid-1990s, owner Claude Brochu concluded that Olympic Stadium was not suitable as a baseball venue, and actively campaigned for a replacement. Brochu sold the team to Jeffrey Loria in 2000, who was equally dissatisfied with Olympic Stadium; he bluntly stated, "We cannot stay here." However, Quebec Premier Lucien Bouchard refused to authorize public funding deemed necessary for a replacement, in part because Olympic Stadium still had not been paid for. The poor conditions played a role in the Expos nearly being disbanded (along with the Minnesota Twins) in the 2001 Major League Baseball contraction plan, which fell through due to court rulings.

Ten years after the last Expos game at Olympic Stadium, the Toronto Blue Jays played two spring training games at the stadium against the New York Mets on March 28 and 29, 2014, with combined attendance of 96,350. The Jays would continue this practice for the next 5 years: against the Cincinnati Reds on April 3 and 4, 2015, with combined attendance of 96,545, the Boston Red Sox on April 1 and 2, 2016, with combined attendance of 106,102, the Pittsburgh Pirates on March 31 and April 1, 2017, combined attendance of 95,382, the St. Louis Cardinals on March 26 and 27, 2018, with combined attendance of 51,151 and the Milwaukee Brewers on March 25 and 26, 2019, with a combined attendance of 46,984. The New York Yankees were scheduled to play there on March 23 and 24, 2020; however, the games were cancelled due to the COVID-19 pandemic. No further games have been scheduled since, ending baseball spring training at the Montreal Olympic Stadium.

==== Longest home runs ====
Willie Stargell of the Pittsburgh Pirates hit the longest home run at Olympic Stadium on May 20, 1978, driving the ball into the second deck in right field for an estimated distance of 535 feet. The yellow seat that marked the location where the ball landed has been removed from the 300 level (a new yellow marker seat was placed in 2015). The seat is now preserved at the Canadian Baseball Hall of Fame. Stargell also hit a notable home run at the Expos' original Montreal home, Jarry Park, which landed in a swimming pool beyond the right field fence.

On April 4, 1988, the Expos' Opening Day, Darryl Strawberry of the New York Mets hit a ball off a speaker which hangs off a concrete ring at Olympic Stadium, estimated to have travelled 525 feet.

Henry Rodríguez hit a ball on June 15, 1997, that bounced off the concrete ring in right field, caromed up to hit the roof, and came down, hitting a speaker. The distance travelled by this ball is also estimated at 525 feet.

The longest home run hit to left field was Vladimir Guerrero's blast on July 28, 2003, that hit an advertising sign directly below the left field upper deck. The ad was later replaced with a sign reading "VLAD 502".

=== Soccer ===
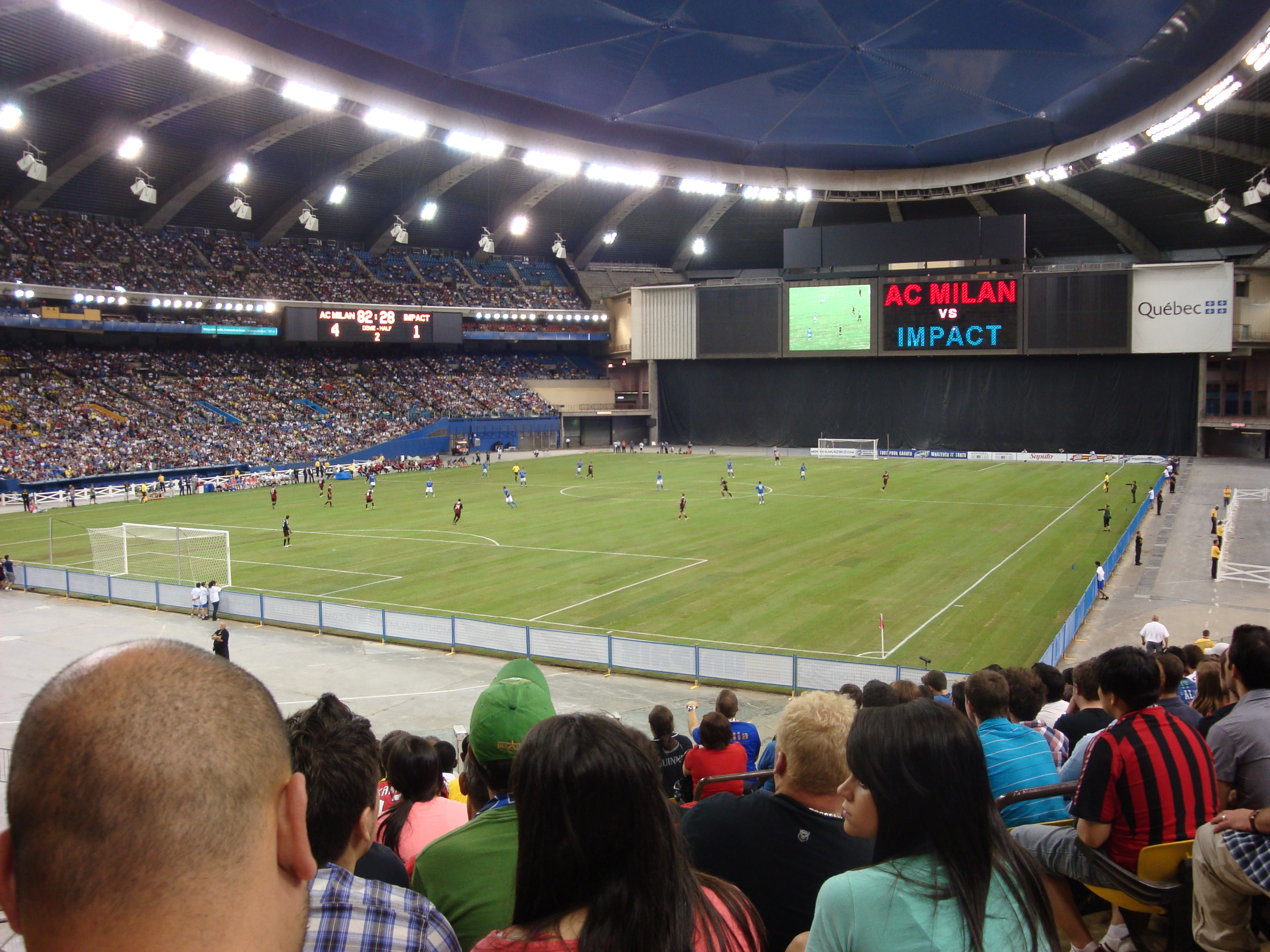
Olympic Stadium with natural grass field

Olympic Stadium was the home of the NASL's Montreal Manic soccer team from 1981 to 1983. A 1981 playoff game against the Chicago Sting attracted a crowd of over 58,000. Several games of the 2007 FIFA Under 20 World Cup were played at Olympic Stadium and drew the largest crowds of the tournament, including two sell-outs of 55,800.

Olympic Stadium hosted a CONCACAF Champions League quarter-final game pitting the original Montreal Impact – who played primarily in the adjacent Saputo Stadium – against Club Santos Laguna of the Liga MX (Mexico First Division) on February 25, 2009. This was the first time an international soccer game took place in Montreal during the winter months. The Impact won 2–0 in front of a record crowd of 55,571. The stadium was also home to a friendly match between the Impact and A.C. Milan of the Italian Serie A on June 2, 2010, before 47,861.

On July 25, 2009, Olympic Stadium became the first stadium outside France to host Ligue 1's Trophée des Champions, a super cup played by the winner of Ligue 1 and the Coupe de France. Over 34,000 attended the game as Bordeaux defeated Guingamp, 2–0. The game was held in Montreal to help Ligue 1 break into the growing North America soccer market.

On March 17, 2012, a record crowd of 58,912 packed Olympic Stadium to cheer on the current version of the Montreal Impact for their MLS debut on home soil, in a 1–1 draw with the Chicago Fire, setting a new attendance record for professional soccer in Quebec. That record was later broken months later on May 12, with 60,860 people for a match against the LA Galaxy, also setting a new attendance record for professional soccer in Canada.

On August 24, 2014, Olympic Stadium hosted the final of the 2014 FIFA U-20 Women's World Cup.

On April 29, 2015, a record crowd of 61,004 attended the CONCACAF Champions League final between the Impact and Club América, also setting a new record attendance for professional soccer in Canada.

Olympic Stadium hosted several 2015 FIFA Women's World Cup matches. One notable game was the semi-final match-up between the United States and Germany that took place on June 30, which drew a crowd of 51,176 people. The Americans won 2–0 in front of a largely partisan crowd and then went on to win their third World Cup trophy the following Sunday in Vancouver. This stadium was originally one of Canada's three candidate venues for the 2026 FIFA World Cup and was expected to get a retractable roof. However, Montreal withdrew from the host city selection process for the World Cup on July 6, 2021.

In June 2026, Major League Soccer commissioner Don Garber stated that Montréal’s Olympic Stadium “can be one of the great stadiums in the entire world” if the province completes its full renovation plan, following his tour of the facility during ongoing roof replacement work. Garber’s remarks came amid concerns raised by CF Montréal president Gabriel Gervais, who warned that the club’s long‑term viability under MLS’s forthcoming winter schedule depends on the stadium being fully modernized and available for year‑round use. While praising the redevelopment vision for Olympic Park, Garber emphasized that the current renovation—focused primarily on an $870 million roof project—does not include the interior upgrades required for winter play, and he dismissed comparisons to relocation scenarios in other markets as “not even comparable.”

The interior renovations were approved by the Montreal government in July 2026.

=== 2015 FIFA Women's World Cup ===
2015 FIFA Women's World Cup
Date	Time (EDT)	Team #1	Result	Team #2	Round	Attendance
9 June 2015	16:00	Spain	1–1	Costa Rica	Group E	10,175
9 June 2015	19:00	Brazil	2–0	South Korea	Group E	10,175
13 June 2015	16:00	Brazil	1–0	Spain	Group E	28,623
13 June 2015	19:00	South Korea	2–2	Costa Rica	Group E	28,623
15 June 2015	16:00	Netherlands	1–1	Canada	Group A	45,420
17 June 2015	16:00	England	2–1	Colombia	Group F	13,862
21 June 2015	16:00	France	3–0	South Korea	Round of 16	15,518
26 June 2015	16:00	Germany	1–1 (5–4 pen.)	France	Quarterfinals	24,859
30 June 2015	19:00	United States	2–0	Germany	Semifinals	51,176

=== Office space ===
Starting in 2018, the Desjardins Group plans to move approximately 1000 of its employees into the Montreal Tower. The company plans to occupy seven of the 12 floors available in the tower. It is estimated that around $60 million in renovations are required before Desjardins can move in.

=== Other ===
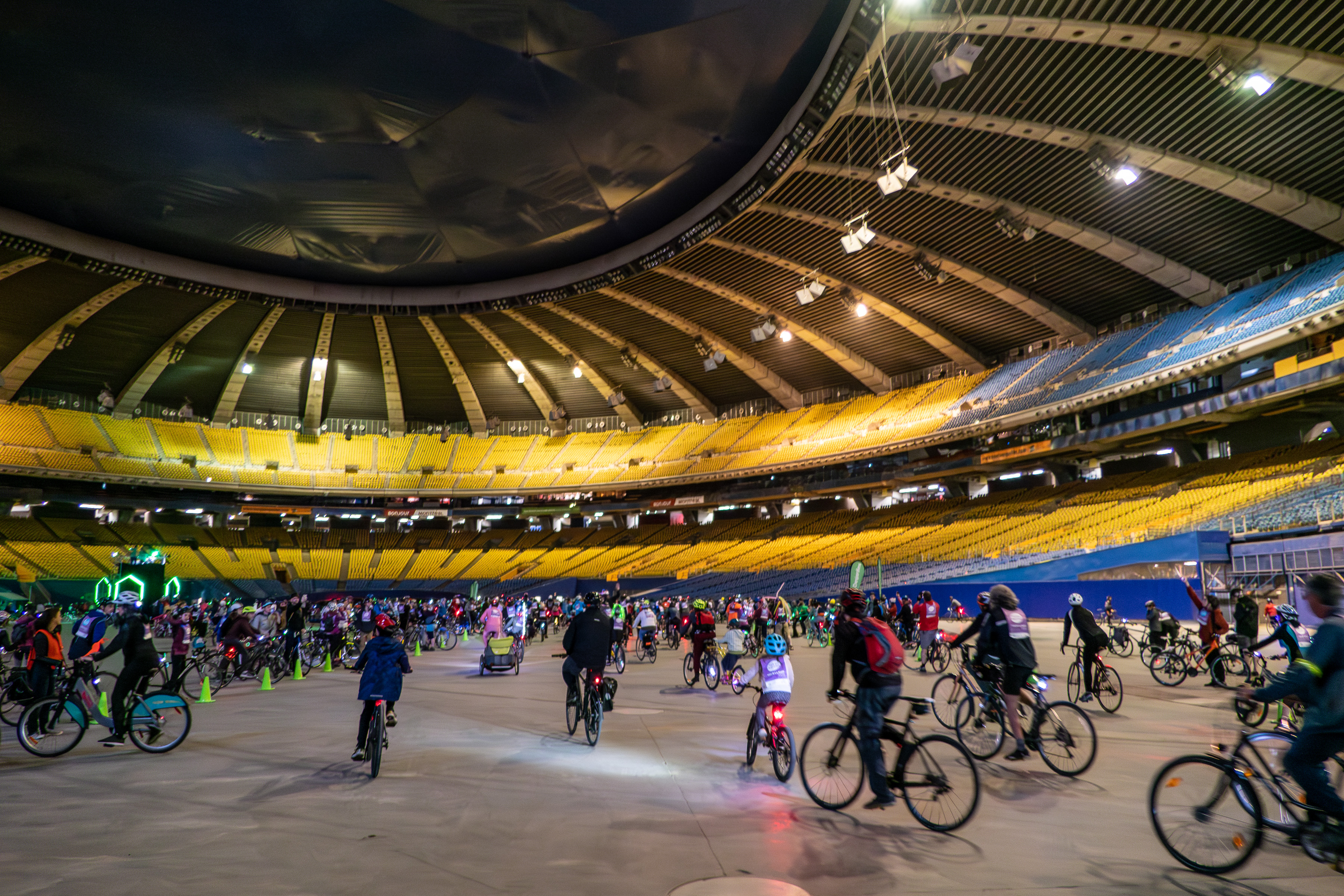
Cyclists ride inside the stadium during the 2019 Tour la Nuit

In winter 1977, Emerson, Lake and Palmer filmed a performance of their arrangement of the Aaron Copland piece "Fanfare For The Common Man" at the stadium. The group also recorded a concert at the stadium in August of that year and released it as a live album.

Olympic Stadium hosted the 1978 World Junior Speed Skating Championships where they crowned the American siblings Eric and Beth Heiden as junior world champions.

In August 1979, Olympic Stadium hosted the 1979 IAAF World Cup in Athletics.

The Catholic Charismatic Renewal Assembly took place in the presence of Father Emiliano Tardif in 1979.

On June 20, 1980, Roberto Durán defeated Sugar Ray Leonard to win the WBC boxing world's welterweight championship at Olympic Stadium.

The Drum Corps International World Championship finals were held at this arena in 1981 and 1982.

On September 11, 1984, Pope John Paul II participated in a youth rally with about 55,000 people in attendance.

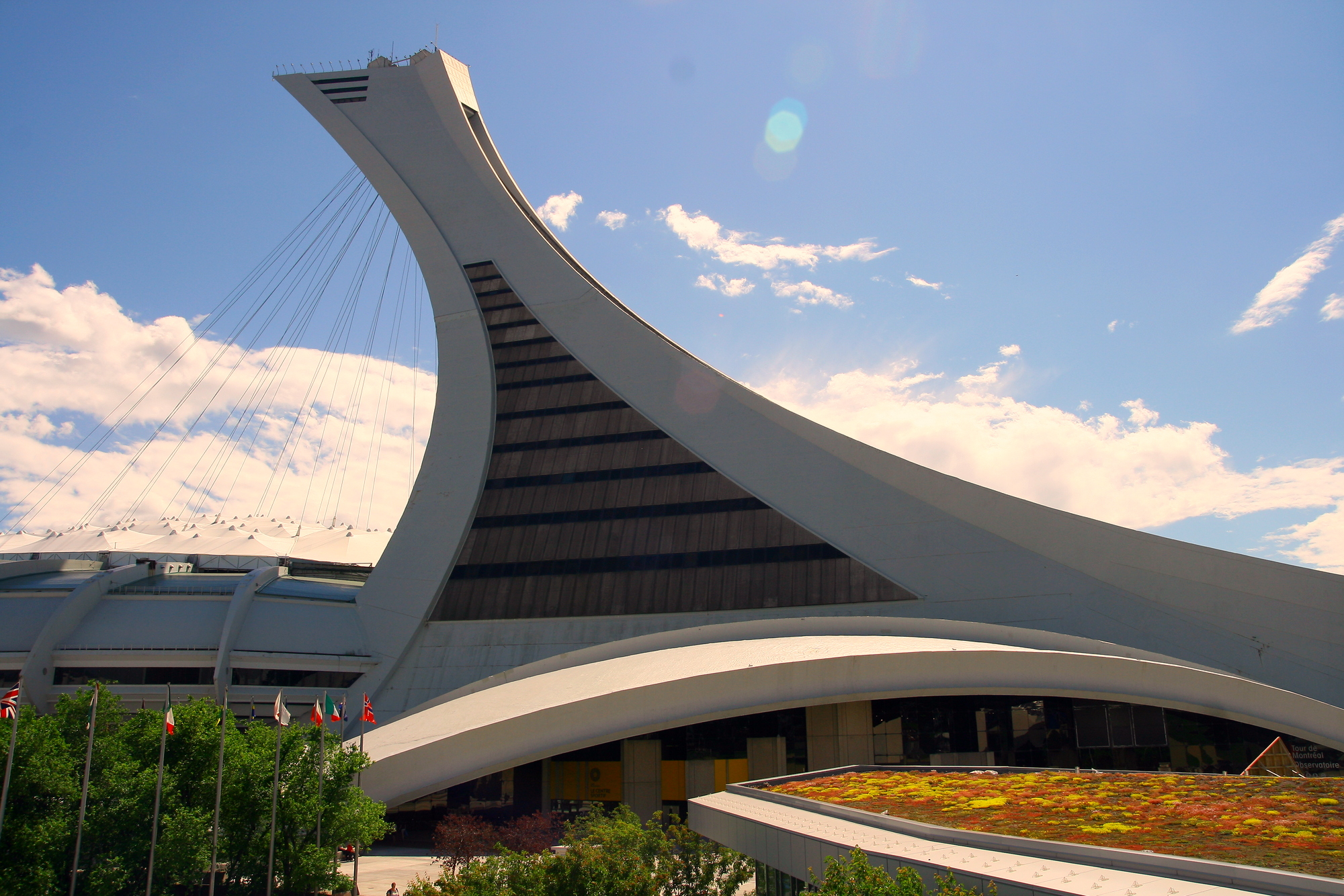
Full view of the Montreal Olympic Stadium's mast from the side

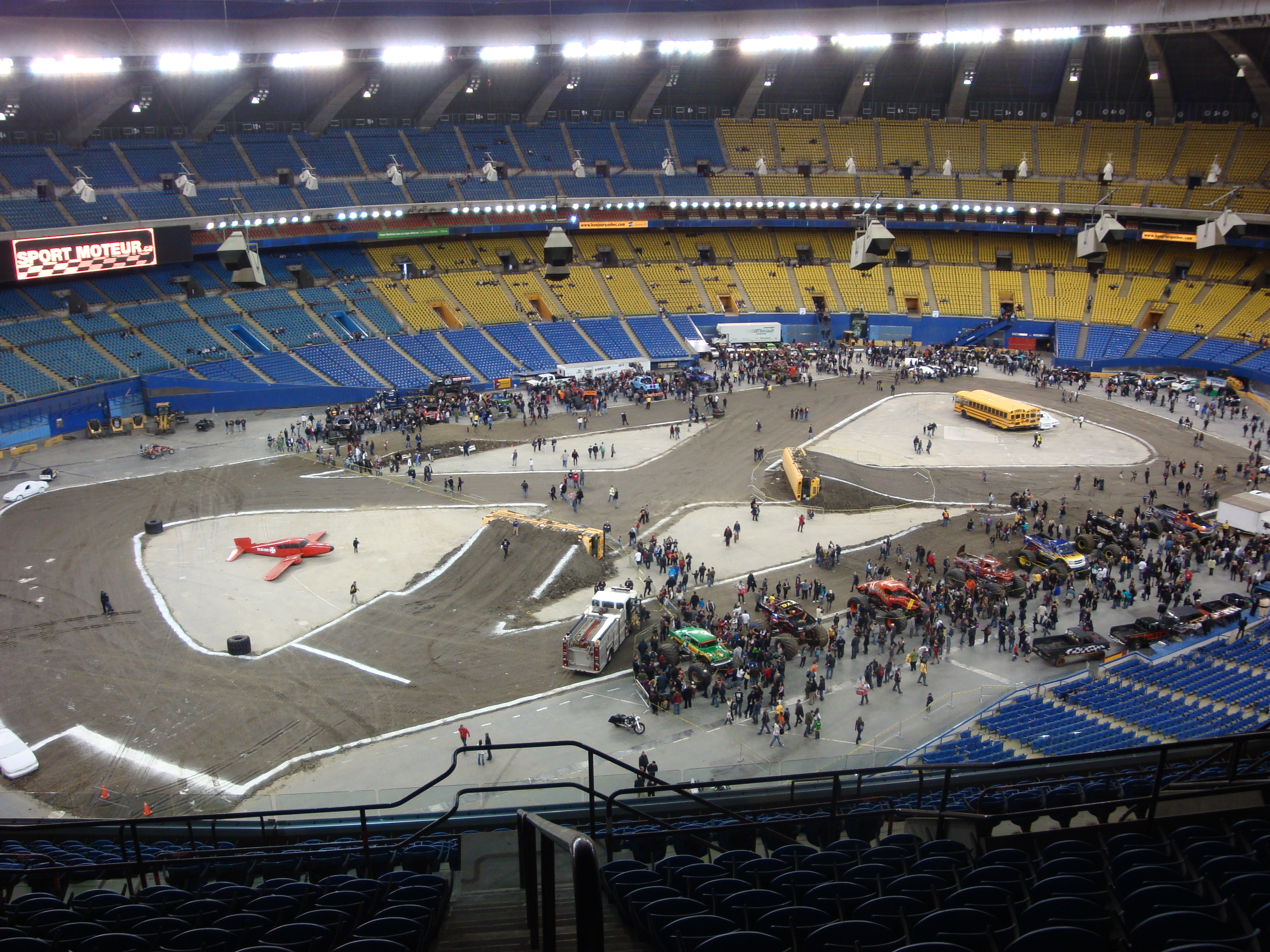
A view from the upper deck of the monster truck layout

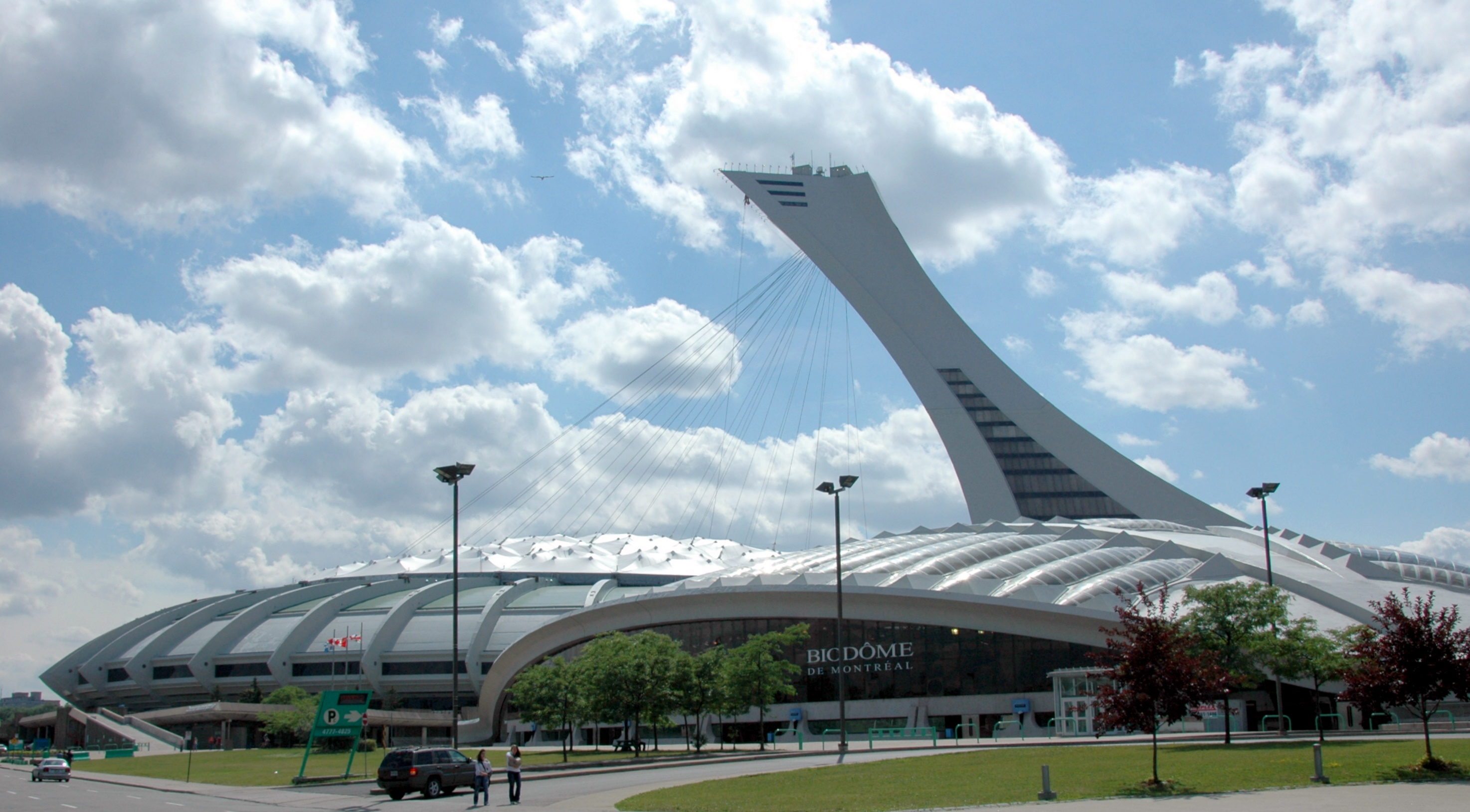
Montreal Biodome in front of Olympic Stadium and its tower

On October 30, 2010, a special mass, to commemorate the ascension to sainthood of Brother André, was held at the stadium. Over 30,000 people attended.

In 2017, the venue was the site of the 2017 Artistic Gymnastics World Championships.

In 2021, Olympic Stadium was named a mass vaccination site by the Quebec government during the COVID-19 pandemic in Quebec, making it one of the largest mass vaccination sites in the province. Quebec premier François Legault received both of his required vaccine doses as well as his booster dose at the stadium.

=== 1992 concert riot ===
On August 8, 1992, Metallica and Guns N' Roses co-headlined a North American Stadium tour Guns N' Roses/Metallica Stadium Tour with an included stop at Olympic Stadium. Several songs into Metallica's set, during the song "Fade to Black", frontman and guitarist James Hetfield was accidentally burned by improper pyrotechnics, forcing the band to cut their set short as Hetfield was rushed to the hospital. Lead guitarist Kirk Hammett, bassist Jason Newsted, and drummer Lars Ulrich promised a makeup concert to quell the sold-out crowd of 54,666. The band would later perform two half-priced shows at the Montreal Forum in February 1993. After a two-hour and fifteen-minute delay, Guns N' Roses performed a shortened set. Singer Axl Rose later blamed the issues on bad audio and vocal problems. Following the set, an estimated 2,000 people began rioting within the stadium and surrounding areas. The fans overturned police cars and set multiple bonfires within the stadium, causing an estimated $600,000 in damage to the stadium and surrounding areas. The Expos' schedule was unaffected by the repairs made to the stadium, as they had been on a seven-game road trip. The Régie banned Guns N' Roses from the venue.

Metallica returned to Olympic Stadium on August 11 and 13, 2023, performing for the first time since the events as part of their M72 world tour.

=== Attendance record ===
Pink Floyd attracted the largest paid crowd to Olympic Stadium: 78,322 people on July 6, 1977. The second-largest crowd was 73,898 for Emerson, Lake & Palmer on August 26, 1977. The largest crowds for an opera performance were on June 16 and 18, 1988, with 63,000 to watch a production of Aida.

== Transit ==
The stadium is directly connected to the Pie-IX metro station on the Green Line of the Montreal Metro. Viau metro station on the Green Line is also nearby.

== Facts and figures ==
- Well over its original budget, the stadium ended up costing $770 million to construct. By 2006, the final cost had risen to $1.47 billion when calculating in repairs, modifications and interest paid out. It took 30 years to finally pay off the cost, leading to its nickname of "The Big Owe" (a play on "The Big O").
- The roof is only 52 m (170.6 ft) above the field of play. As a result, a number of pop-ups and long home runs hit the roof over the years, necessitating the painting of orange lines on the roof to separate foul balls from fair balls.
- During their years playing in Olympic Stadium, the Expos were one of only two teams not to employ the traditional yellow-painted foul poles with the New York Mets being the other. Olympic's poles were painted red, while the Mets' home, Shea Stadium (and later Citi Field), used orange poles.
- Olympic Stadium holds the record for a soccer game attendance in Canada. At the 1976 Summer Olympics soccer final, 71,617 people witnessed East Germany's 3–1 win over Poland.
- A yellow seat on the 300 level commemorated a 535-foot (163 m) home run by Willie Stargell of the Pittsburgh Pirates. It has since been moved to the Canadian Baseball Hall of Fame.
- The Montreal games of the 2007 FIFA U-20 World Cup were held at Olympic Stadium on a removable Team Pro EF RD surface that was purchased specifically for the tournament.
- For the first time since the Olympic Games in 1976, a natural grass field was installed in the stadium for the Montreal Impact match versus A.C. Milan on June 2, 2010.
- The stadium features a 101,600-watt public address system.
- The main room of the stadium is the largest in Quebec, at 43,504 m^{2} (468,270 sq ft)
- Tony Gwynn of the San Diego Padres got his 3,000th hit at Olympic Stadium on August 6, 1999, with a single in the first inning off Expos pitcher Dan Smith. He had four hits in the game.

== Commemorations ==
As part of the commemorative stamps created for the 1976 Olympics, Canada Post issued a stamp depicting the Olympic Stadium and Velodrome.

== See also ==
- List of Canadian Football League stadiums
- List of soccer stadiums in Canada
- List of Major League Soccer stadiums
- List of former Major League Baseball stadiums
- Olympic Stadium
- List of tallest buildings and structures in the world

Events and tenants
Preceded by Olympiastadion; Munich	Summer Olympics; Opening and Closing Ceremonies (Olympic Stadium); 1976	Succeeded by Grand Arena; Moscow
Preceded by Olympiastadion; Munich	Olympic Athletics competitions Main Venue; 1976	Succeeded by Grand Arena; Moscow
Preceded by Olympiastadion; Munich	Summer Olympics; Football Men's Finals (Olympic Stadium); 1976	Succeeded by Grand Arena; Moscow
Preceded by Autostade; Memorial Stadium; Percival Molson Stadium	Home of the Montreal Alouettes; 1976–1986; 1996–1997; 2001 – current (with Percival Molson Stadium)	Succeeded by Franchise folded Percival Molson Stadium current home (part time)
Preceded by Jarry Park Stadium	Home of the Montreal Expos; 1977–2004	Succeeded by RFK Stadium (as Washington Nationals)
Preceded by Eisstadion Inzell	Host of the World Junior Speed Skating Championships; 1978	Succeeded by L'Anneau de Vitesse
Preceded by Cleveland Stadium	Host of the Major League Baseball All-Star Game; 1982	Succeeded by Comiskey Park
Preceded by Legion Field	Host of the Drum Corps International; World Championship; 1981–1982	Succeeded by Miami Orange Bowl
Preceded by National Olympic Stadium; Tokyo	FIFA U-20 Women's World Cup; Final Venue; 2014	Succeeded by National Football Stadium; Port Moresby
