= Fairview Pointe-Claire =

- Fairview Pointe-Claire in 2025
- Coordinates: 45°27′50.5″N 73°49′52.9″W
- Address: 6801 Trans-Canada Highway; Pointe-Claire, Quebec, Canada; H9R 5J2
- Opened: August 12, 1965
- Developer: Cadillac Development Corporation
- Manager: Cadillac Fairview
- Owner: Cadillac Fairview
- Num. of stores: 175
- Num. of anchor tenants: 5
- Floor area: 1,045,178 sq ft (97,100 m^{2}) (GLA)
- Floors: 2
- Parking: Outdoor
- Public transit: Fairview–Pointe-Claire
- Website: www.cfshops.com/fairview-pointe-claire.html

Fairview Pointe-Claire (corporately styled as "CF Fairview Pointe-Claire") is the largest shopping mall in the West Island and one of the biggest on the Island of Montreal. It is located in the city of Pointe-Claire, Quebec, Canada, at the intersection of Trans-Canada Highway and Saint-Jean Boulevard.

Fairview Pointe-Claire attracts 8 million visitors each year. 175 stores occupy about 1,000,000 sq ft (92,900 m^{2}) spread on two levels of shopping space. The major tenants are Winners, HomeSense, Sports Experts/Atmosphere, La Maison Simons and Best Buy.

== History ==
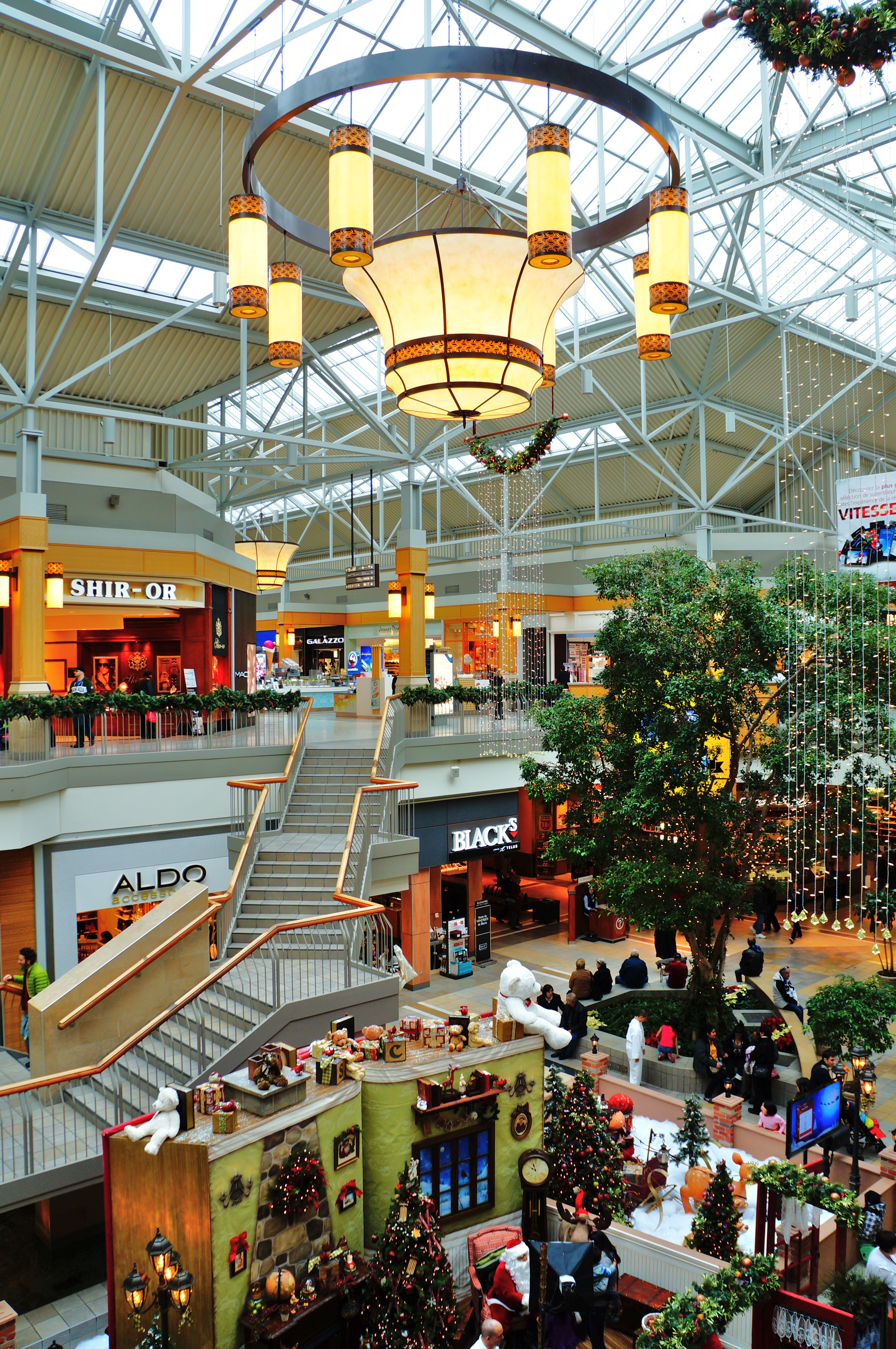
Mall during Christmas in 2012 before renovation

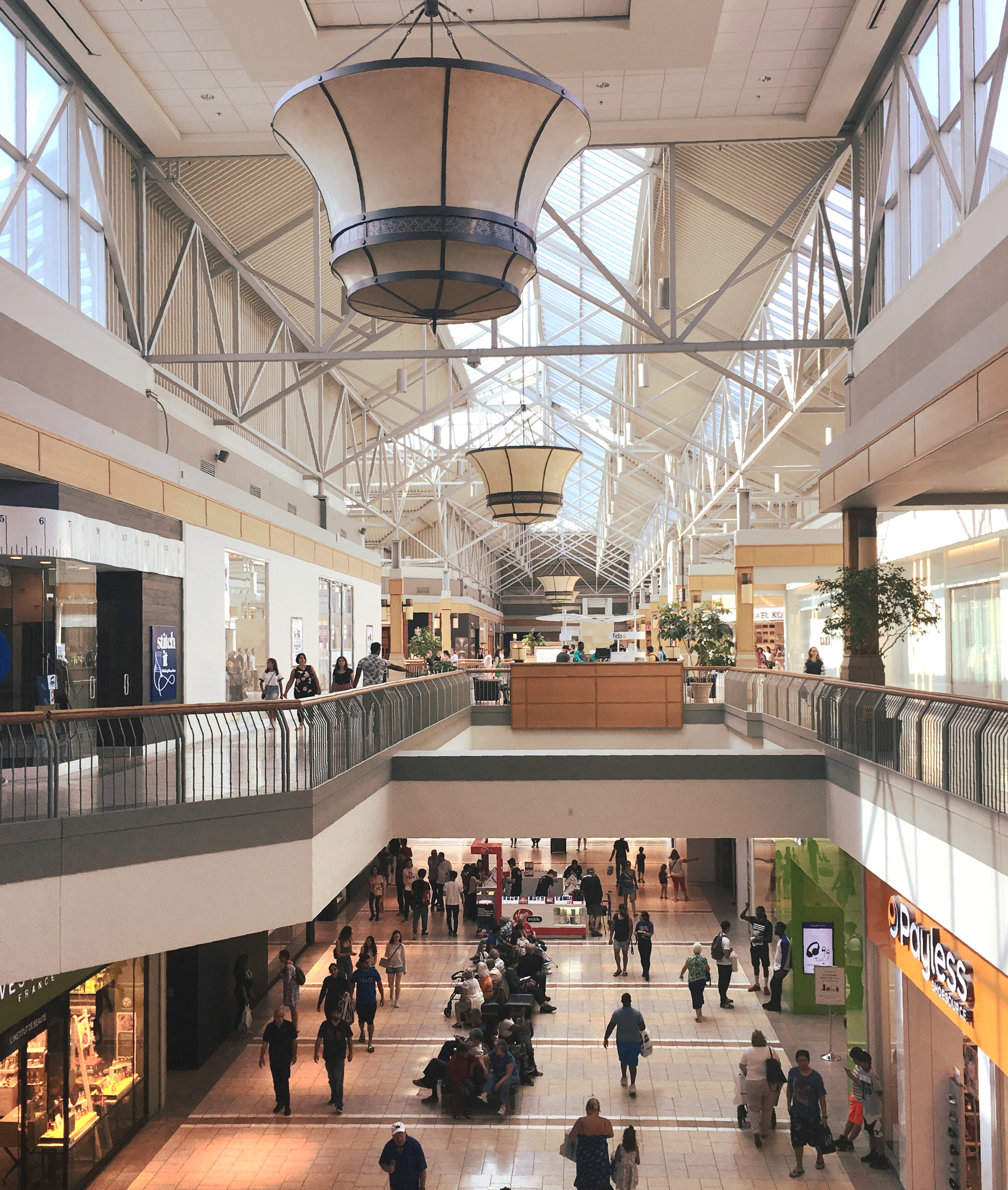
Shopping mall in 2018

Fairview Pointe-Claire was inaugurated on August 12, 1965, with anchors Simpsons, Steinberg's, Eaton's and Pascal's. It had 70 tenants. Notable mid-sized tenants included Holt Renfrew, Ogilvy's and Woolworth's. Fairview Pointe-Claire was a single level mall at the time; only tenants Simpsons, Eaton's, W.H. Smith Books, and Pascal's had two floors. Although they initially had only two floors, Simpsons and Eaton's were both built with the capacity to each house a third level in the future. Simpson's was located on the east end of the mall and had on the parking its own auto centre with an Esso. Eaton's was in the west end and back then used the English name (with the letter "s") for the store signage of this location.

At the time of its opening, Fairview Pointe-Claire was the first enclosed shopping mall in the West Island, the first shopping centre in Quebec with either a Simpsons or Eaton's store, as well as the second largest mall in all of Canada. Simpsons purchased a replica of Michelangelo's Statue of David and installed it in the mall's hallway, a move that was met with criticism.

In 1985, Fairview Pointe-Claire was extensively converted to a two-level shopping mall whose renovation was completed on August 14, almost to the day of its 20th anniversary. The mall went from 88 to 201 stores and its first floor was completely renovated. Among the additions was the introduction of the food court.

Simpsons was taken over by The Bay on January 29, 1989, with no layoffs in the store.

Pascal's declared bankruptcy in 1991.

A Sears store of 164,000 sq ft (15,200 m^{2}) opened on August 12, 1992. It was a new construction built on the south side of the shopping centre.

Eaton's closed on October 17, 1999, after 34 years in the mall. Sears relocated in 2001 to Eaton's former location. Sears's original location is now home to HomeSense, Decathlon, Sports Experts/Atmosphere, Imaginaire and Columbus Cafe & Co. Winners, Renaud-Bray, Old Navy and Starbucks Coffee, who were at one time in the space where Sears was, have since relocated to other parts of the shopping centre.

On July 26, 2001, Déco Découverte opened one of its first two Quebec stores in Super C's former space.

A Best Buy opened in the fall of 2005. It was built in the place of the torn down Pascal's store, itself having been converted from 1992 to 1998 into an Aventure Électronique Superstore, competing against nearby Future Shop in Complexe Pointe-Claire . Like Aventure Électronique (but unlike Pascal's), Best Buy can only be accessed from the outside.

It was announced in September 2017 that the Sears at Fairview Pointe-Claire was targeted for closure along with nine other stores all located outside of Quebec. The Pointe-Claire location closed in December 2017. The first level was repurposed for dining with the food court moving into the space on April 1, 2021. The second and third floors of the location were replaced a year later by Simons on May 5, 2022. The old food court was subdivided for Dollarama and Linen Chest.

Hudson's Bay officially closed its doors along with all their remaining stores in June 2025. The Pointe-Claire store was one of six Hudson's Bay locations in the country that the company had attempted to keep open.

== Ownership ==
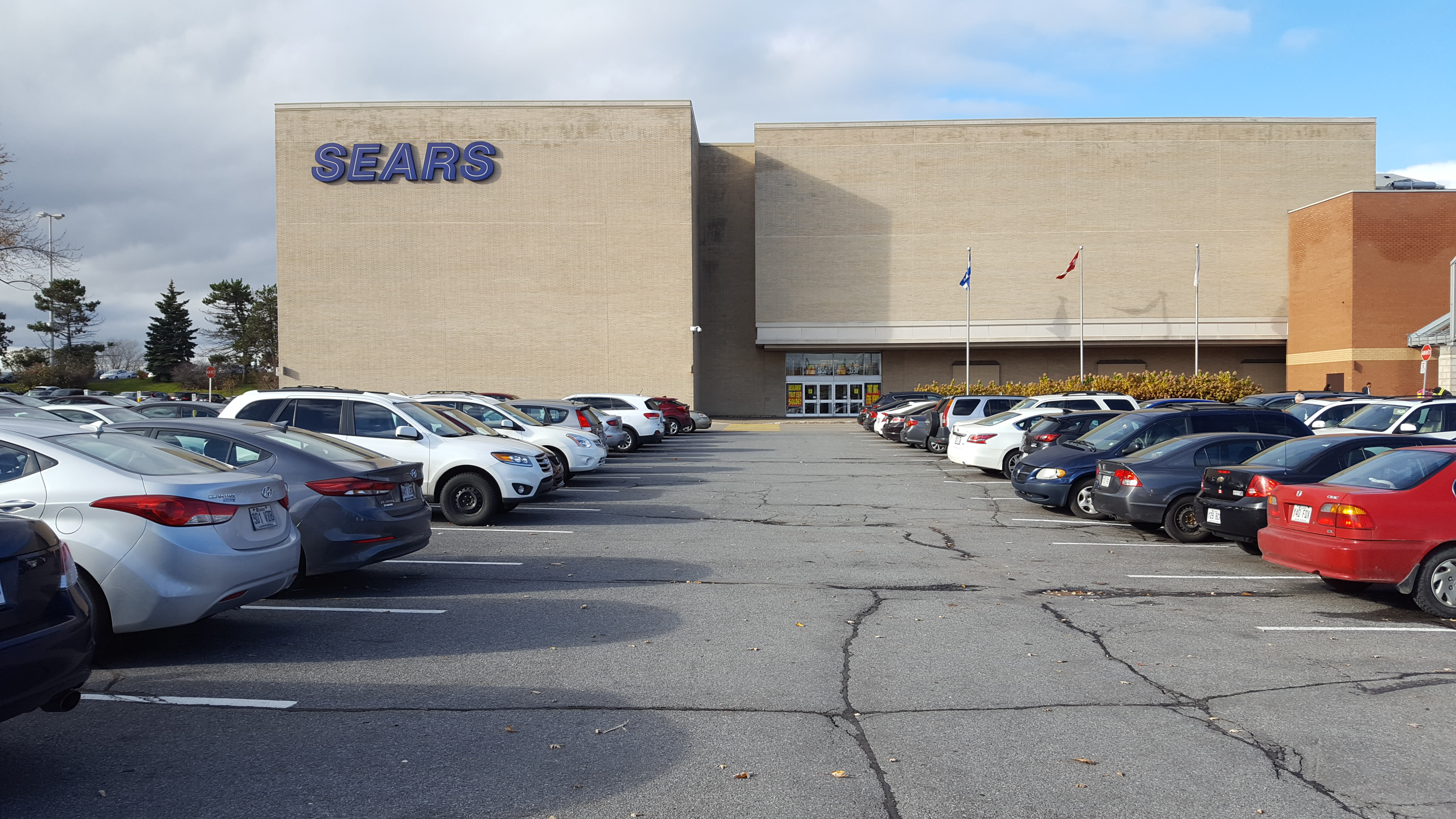
Sears' second location. This Sears store had three floors. Originally Eaton's, the building was partially transformed after Sears closed and is today shared between Simons, the food court and Lucille's restaurant.

Fairview Pointe-Claire was originally the joint property of Simpsons Limited and Cemp Investments, and managed by Fairview Shopping Centres Ltd (a subsidiary of Cemp Investments). The mall was built by Cadillac Development Corporation.

In 1974, Cadillac Development Corporation and Fairview Corporation merge to form Cadillac Fairview. From then on, Fairview Pointe-Claire was the joint property of Cadillac Fairview and Simpsons.

In 1984, Markborough Properties replaced Simpsons as co-owner of the mall. Cadillac Fairview retained its share of the mall.

In 1997, Markborough Properties was swallowed by Cambridge Shopping Centres which merge in 2001 with Ivanhoe Corporation to form Ivanhoé Cambridge.

In 2021, Cadillac Fairview swapped the 50% share it held in Galeries d'Anjou for Ivanhoé Cambridge's in Fairview Pointe-Claire to become the sole owner of the mall.

== Public transportation ==
Fairview—Pointe-Claire old bus square's closure notice, in 2026

The north parking lot of Fairview Pointe-Claire was home to Fairview bus terminus of the Société de transport de Montréal. A new light metro station, Fairview–Pointe-Claire station of the Réseau express métropolitain, is next to the mall. The Fairview bus terminal permanently closed on May 18, 2026, with the former building planned to be demolished in the future weeks to leave more place for the parking lot.

=== Former connecting bus routes ===
Société de transport de Montréal
No.	Route	Connects to	Service times / notes
200	Sainte-Anne-de-Bellevue	Beaconsfield; Terminus Macdonald	Daily Served near Brunswick boulevard since May 18, 2026
201	Saint-Charles / Saint-Jean	Beaconsfield; Cedar Park	Daily No longer served since May 18, 2026
202	Dawson	Du Collège; Dorval; Valois; Cedar Park	Daily Served near Brunswick boulevard since May 18, 2026
203	Carson	Pointe-Claire; Valois; Dorval	Daily Served near Brunswick boulevard since May 18, 2026
204	Cardinal	Pine Beach; Valois; Dorval	Daily No longer served since May 18, 2026
205	Gouin	Pierrefonds-Roxboro	Daily Served near Brunswick boulevard since May 18, 2026
206	Roger-Pilon	Pierrefonds-Roxboro	Daily Served near Brunswick boulevard since May 18, 2026
207	Jacques-Bizard		Daily Served near Brunswick boulevard since May 18, 2026
208	Brunswick	Pierrefonds-Roxboro; Sunnybrooke	Daily Served near Brunswick boulevard since May 18, 2026
215	Henri-Bourassa	Côte-Vertu; Bois-Franc	Daily Served near Brunswick boulevard since May 18, 2026
217	Anse-à-l'Orme	Beaconsfield; Kirkland	Daily Permanently removed since May 18, 2026
270	Pointe-Claire - Navette Or by taxi	Valois	Will still serve the Terminus it self as the taxi will drop elders at the door.
470	Express Pierrefonds	Côte-Vertu	Daily Served near Brunswick boulevard since May 18, 2026
TA ♿︎	STM Transport adapté		Ta users can specifically request the terminus door even after closure of the terminus.
Exo La Presqu'Île sector
No.	Route	Connects to	Service times / notes
91	Gérald-Godin / Pointe-Claire	Vaudreuil; Île-Perrot	Permanently removed

== See also ==
- List of largest shopping malls in Canada
- List of malls in Montreal
- List of shopping malls in Canada
- Pointe-Claire
