= Terminus Côte-Vertu =

Bus station in Montreal, Canada

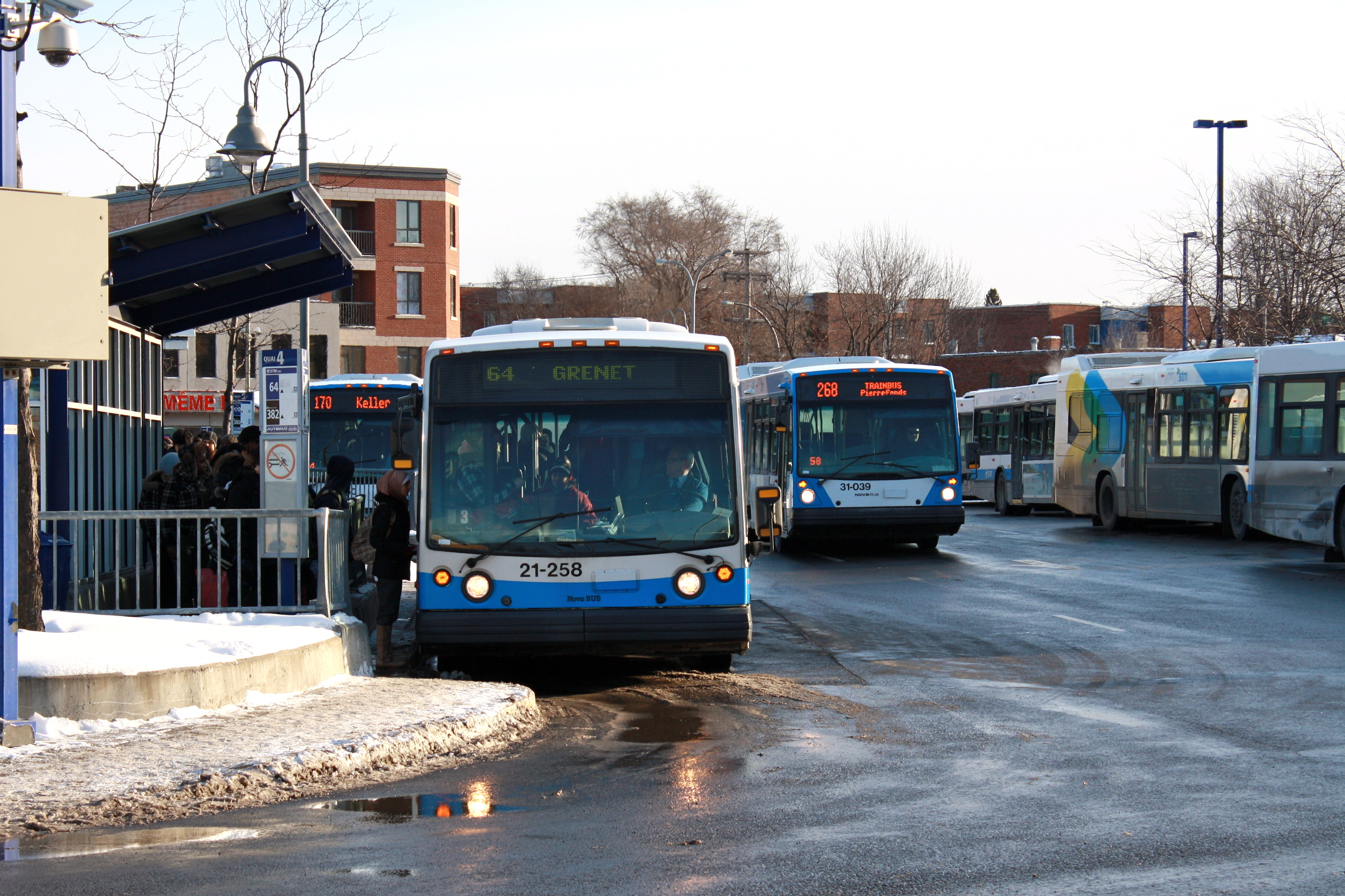

General information
- Location: 1505 Côte-Vertu Boulevard, Saint-Laurent, Quebec, Canada
- Coordinates: 45°30′49″N 73°41′01″W
- Owner: ARTM
- Operator: Société de transport de Montréal
- Bus stands: 23
- Bus operators: STM bus; STM taxibus; Société de transport de Laval
- Connections: Côte-Vertu

Construction
- Parking: None
- Cycle facilities: 40 space rack

Other information
- Fare zone: ARTM: A
- Website: Côte-Vertu

History
- Opened: October 26, 2004 (north); January 31, 2005 (south; redesign)

Passengers
- 2016: 13,022,700 (Exo)
Location

Terminus Côte-Vertu is an ARTM bus terminus partly north and partly south of the Côte-Vertu Metro station. It is located in the borough of Saint-Laurent in Montreal, Quebec, Canada.

Before this new terminus was built, all bus stops were located on the streets near the Metro station entrances. This created a lot of traffic jams on Côte-Vertu and Decarie boulevards. The buses heading to the West Island were inconveniently located at the Edouard-Laurin street entrance. The southern portion of the terminus occupies part of what was once the Edouard-Laurin Streetcar Terminus.

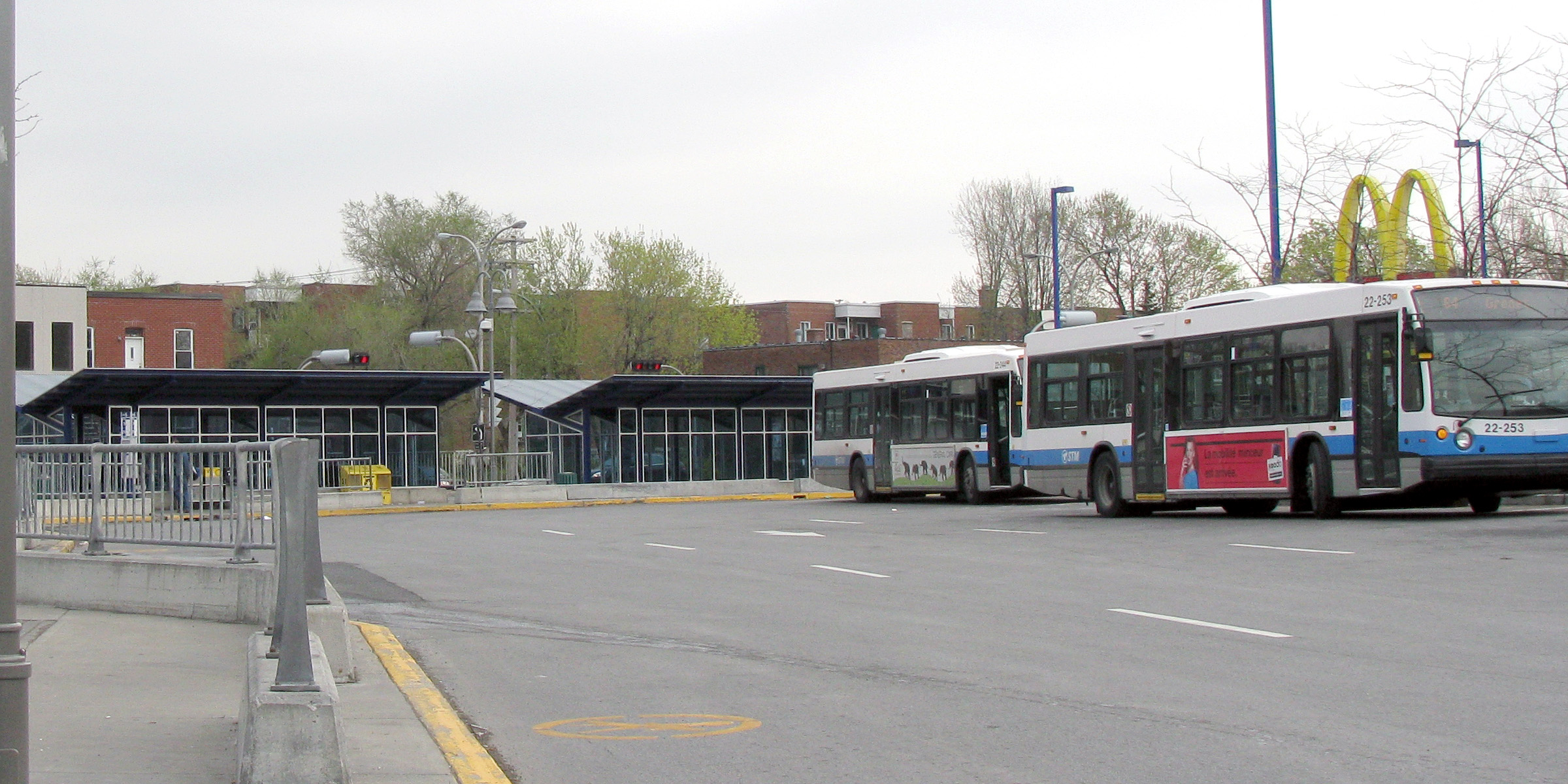
North site viewed from Decarie entrance/exit

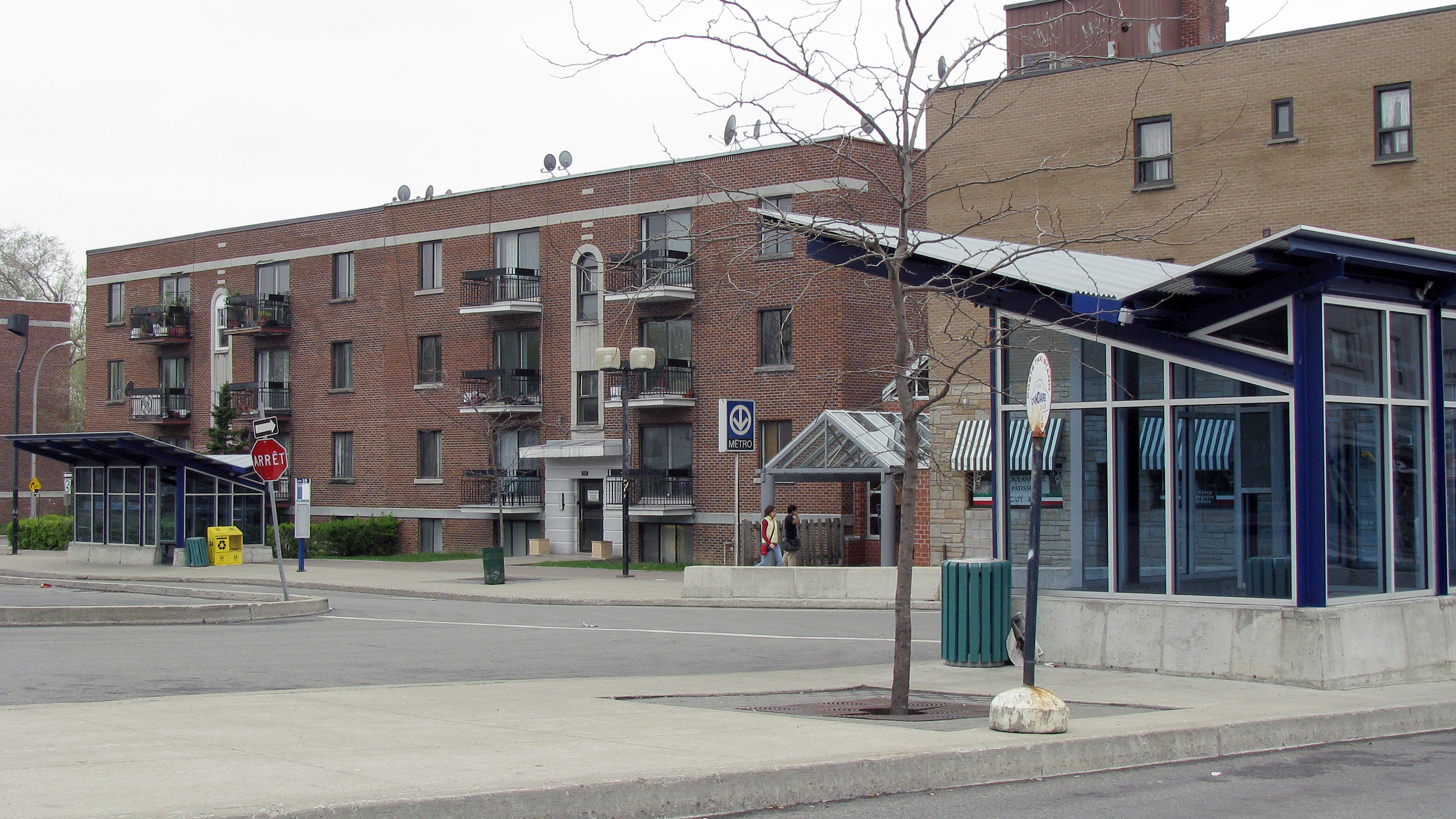
South site from Decarie/Edouard-Laurin, The bus shelter at the right, as well as the pavement in front of it, have been replaced by Place Rodolphe-Rousseau.

== Connecting bus routes ==
North site platforms are used exclusively by Société de transport de Montréal (STM) buses, with the remainder of the STM routes using curb side bus stops on Côte-Vertu Boulevard, Decarie Boulevard and Gohier Street. The south site is used by Société de transport de Laval (STL) buses.

STL does not provide service on journeys entirely within Montreal. Buses coming from Laval will drop off but cannot pick up passengers within Montreal, and on returning trips passengers can board in Montreal but will not be allowed to descend until reaching Laval.

Société de transport de Montréal
No.	Route	Connects to	Service times / notes
17	Décarie	Place-Saint-Henri; Vendôme; Snowdon; Namur; De La Savane; Du Collège	Daily
64	Grenet	Bois-Franc	Daily
70	Poirier		Daily
72	Alfred-Nobel	Des Sources; Fairview-Pointe-Claire	Weekdays only
121	Sauvé / Côte-Vertu	Montpellier; Ahuntsic; Sauvé	Daily
128	Saint-Laurent	Du Collège; Montpellier; Du Collège; Côte-de-Liesse	Daily
170	Keller	Bois-Franc	Daily
171	Henri-Bourassa	Montpellier; Bois-de-Boulogne; Henri-Bourassa	Daily
174	Côte-Vertu		Weekdays only
177	Thimens	Montpellier	Daily
196	Parc-Industriel-Lachine		Daily
215	Henri-Bourassa / Brunswick	Bois-Franc; Fairview-Pointe-Claire	Daily
216	Transcanadienne	Des Sources	Weekdays, peak only
225	Hymus	Des Sources; Fairview-Pointe-Claire	Weekdays, peak only
282	Côte-Vertu Ouest	Montpellier	Weekends and public holidays From 5:45am to 12:05am
368 ☾	Avenue-Du-Mont-Royal	Frontenac; Édouard-Montpetit; Université-de-Montréal; Côte-Sainte-Catherine; Plamondon; Namur; De La Savane	Night service
371 ☾	Décarie	Du Collège; De La Savane; Namur; Snowdon; Place-Saint-Henri; Lionel-Groulx; Atwater	Night service
378 ☾	Sauvé / YUL Aéroport	Sauvé; Montpellier; Du Collège; Dorval	Night service Connects to Montréal–Trudeau International Airport
380 ☾	Henri-Bourassa	Henri-Bourassa; Bois-de-Boulogne; Montpellier; Du Collège	Night service
382 ☾	Pierrefonds / Saint-Charles	Namur; De La Savane; Du Collège; Bois-Franc; Sunnybrooke; Pierrefonds-Roxboro; Beaconsfield	Night service
468	Express Pierrefonds / Gouin	Pierrefonds-Roxboro; Sunnybrooke	Daily
470	Express Pierrefonds	Fairview-Pointe-Claire	Daily
475	Express Dollard-des-Ormeaux		Weekdays, peak only
521	Anse-à-l'Orme / Kirkland Express Shuttle	Anse-à-l'Orme; Kirkland	Used in case of a service disruption on the REM during peak hours only
525	Anse-à-l'Orme Branch / Côte-Vertu Shuttle	Anse-à-l'Orme; Kirkland; Fairview-Pointe-Claire; Des Sources	Used in case of a service disruption on the REM
528	Fairview / Des Sources / Côte-Vertu Shuttle	Fairview-Pointe-Claire; Des Sources	Used in case of a service disruption on the REM
TA ♿︎	STM Transport adapté		
Société de transport de Laval
No.	Route	Connects to	Service times / notes
144	Métro Côte-Vertu - Sainte-Dorothée	Bois-Franc	Daily
151	Métro Côte-Vertu - Sainte-Rose	Bois-Franc	Daily
313	Métro Côte-Vertu / Chomedey		Only two trips per direction
713	Métro Côte-Vertu - Sainte-Dorothée	Bois-Franc; Sainte-Dorothée; Île-Bigras	Weekdays only
714	REM Deux-Montagnes / Côte-Vertu	Deux-Montagnes	Used in case of a service disruption on the REM
TA ♿︎	STL Transport adapté		

== Nearby points of interest ==
- Les Galeries Norgate
- Vanier College
- Cégep de Saint-Laurent
- Centre hospitalier de Saint-Laurent
- CLSC Saint-Laurent
- Promenade de Vieux Saint-Laurent
- Saint-Laurent Museum of Art
- former Saint-Laurent Postal Station
- former Saint-Laurent Police Station
- Saint-Laurent Public Library
- Saint-Laurent Municipal Courthouse
- Saint-Laurent Fire Station No.1
- Saint-Laurent City Hall
- Decarie Hot Dog
