= Côte-Vertu =

Côte-Vertu may refer to:

- Côte-Vertu Boulevard, in Saint-Laurent and Dorval (Montreal)
- Côte-Vertu station, a Montreal Metro station in the borough of Saint-Laurent
- Terminus Côte-Vertu, an Exo bus terminus partly north and partly south of the Côte-Vertu Metro station in the borough of Saint-Laurent

== See also ==
- Place Vertu, a shopping centre in the borough of Saint-Laurent (Montreal)
