= Fairview forest =

Forest in Quebec, Canada

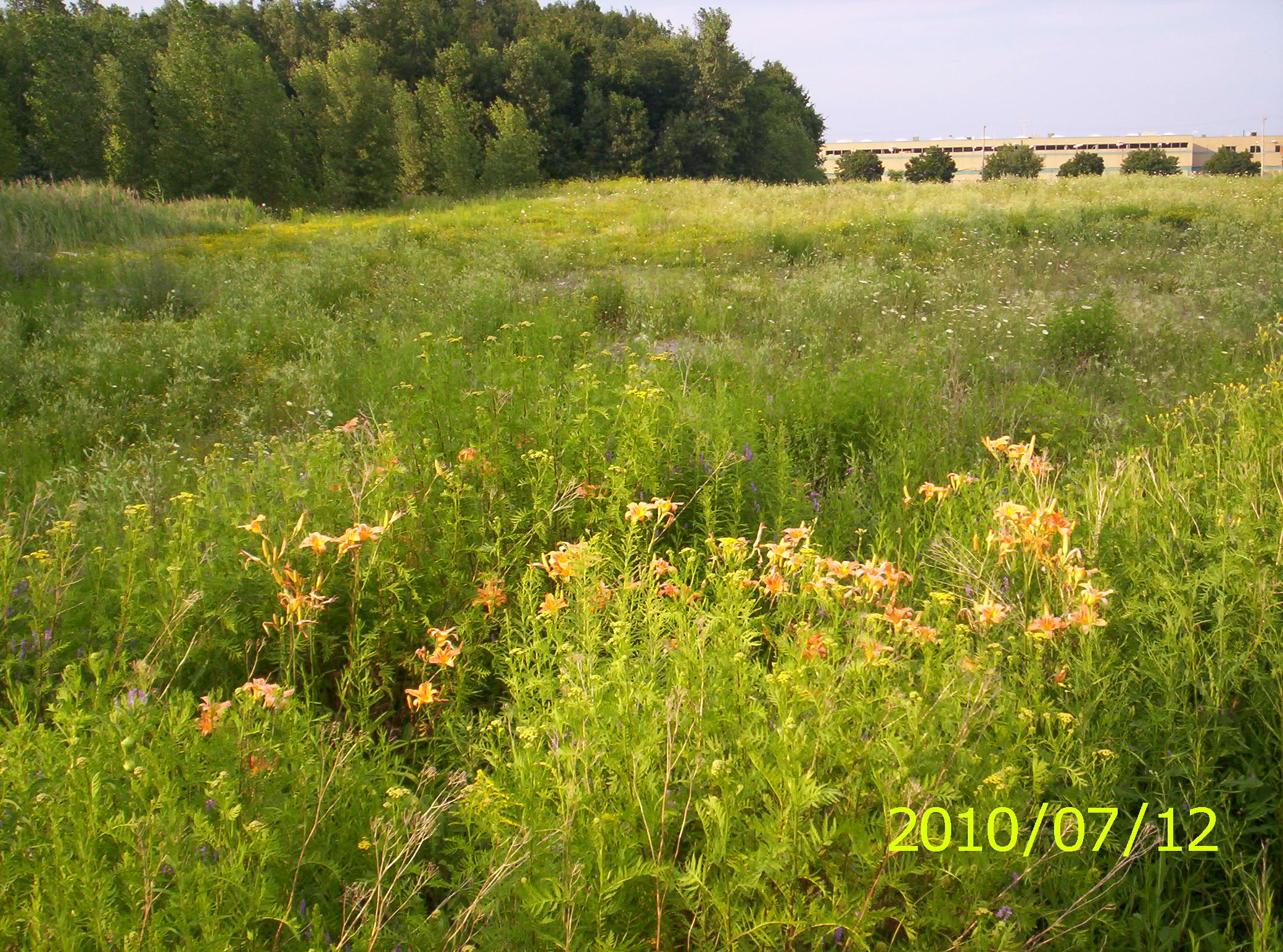
- Fairview forest

- Location within Montreal

Geography
- Location: Pointe-Claire, Quebec, Canada
- Coordinates: 45°27′38″N 73°50′13″W

Administration
- Status: 100% privately owned

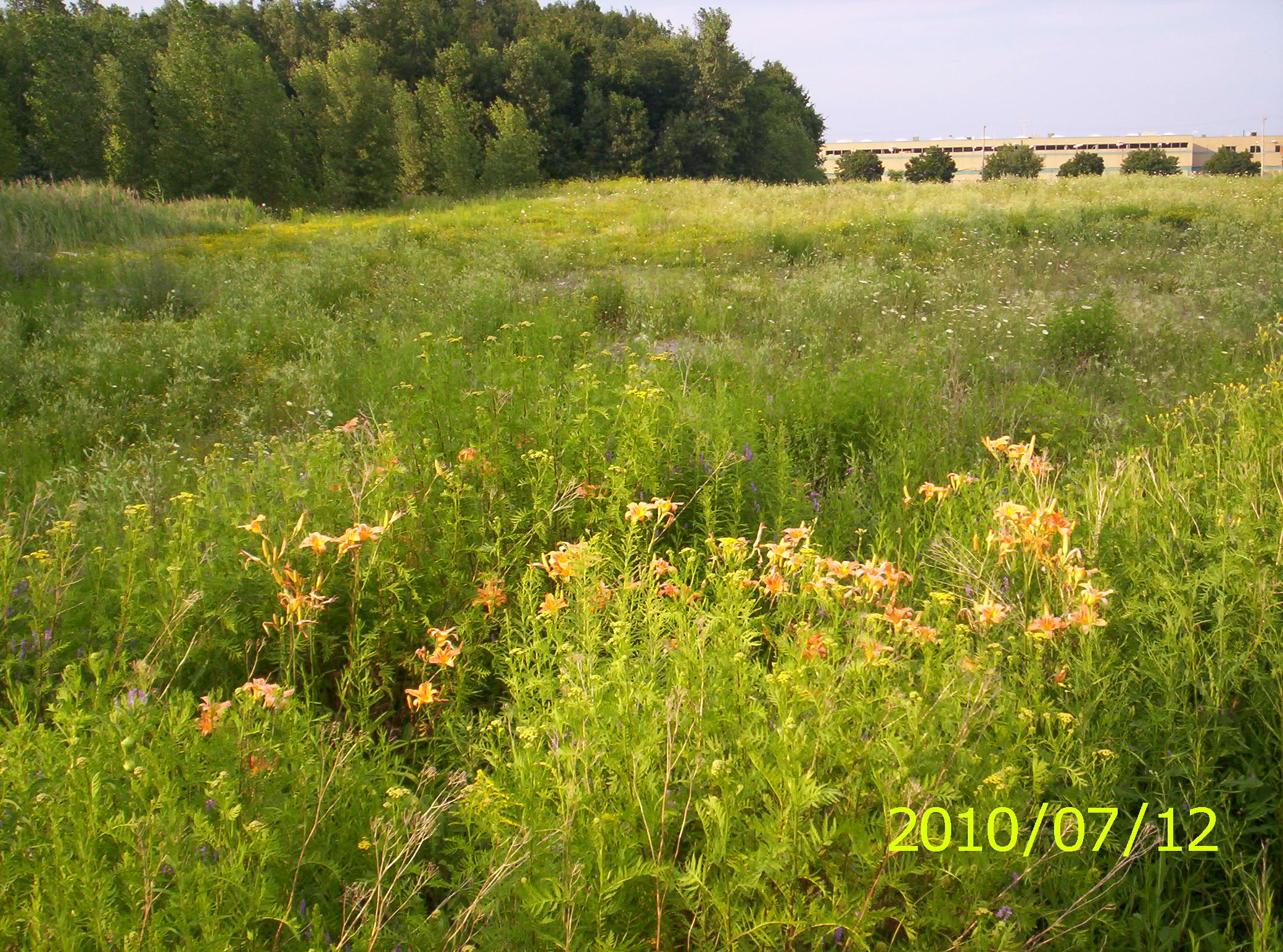
Forest is in the top left, field is 3/4 of the photo and hardware store is on the top right.

Fairview forest is a forested area of land located in Pointe Claire on the island of Montreal, Quebec, Canada. The area is approximately 50 acres in size and is mostly covered in trees. The property is just west of the Fairview shopping centre, with Highway 40 directly on its southern border. At one time, John Abbott College owned the property.

The STM (Société de transport de Montréal) believes the area is a forest and has marked it as such on their map of the island.

The current owner of the property is seeking to cut down the forest and make a new urban area. Local residents have formed a group in efforts to stop the destruction of the forest.

An online petition has more than 27 thousand signatures in support of saving the forest.

The forest can be seen in heat map of the island of Montreal as a relatively cool area.

== Ownership ==
The current owner of the land is Cadillac Fairview who bought it in 2013 from Smart Centres.
