= Pine Beach =

Pine Beach can refer to:

- Pine Beach, New Jersey
- Pine Beach station, a railway station in Dorval, Quebec, Canada
