= Côte-Vertu Boulevard =

Thoroughfare in Montreal, Canada

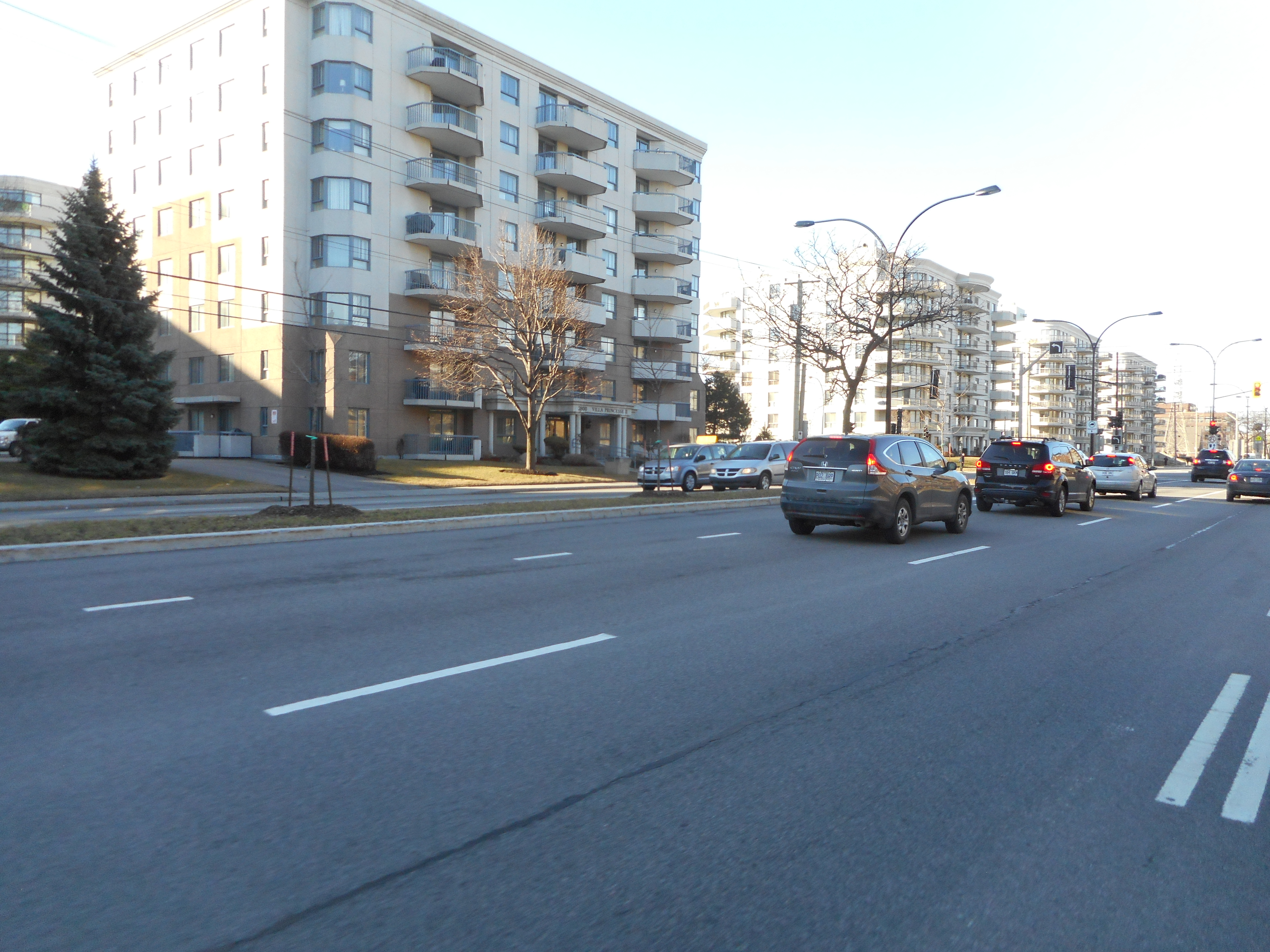
- Interactive map of Côte-Vertu Boulevard
- Native name: Boulevard de la Côte-Vertu (French)
- Former name(s): Saint-Mathieu Street, Côte-Sainte-Marguerite Road
- Length: 7 km (4.3 mi)
- Location: Saint-Laurent and Dorval, Quebec
- West end: Technical Centre of Air Canada west of Autoroute 13
- Major junctions: A-13 Chomedey Expressway; A-40 (TCH) Metropolitan Expressway; A-15 Laurentian Expressway; R-117 Marcel-Laurin Boulevard
- East end: Laurentian Autoroute (Quebec Autoroute 15) (continues as Sauvé street)

Côte-Vertu Boulevard (French: Boulevard de la Côte-Vertu) is a boulevard in the Saint-Laurent borough in Montreal, Quebec. It crosses the borough from north-east to south-west of the Air Canada Technical Center to the west of the Chomedey Highway Autoroute 13 (in the city of Dorval) to the Laurentian Autoroute 15 where it takes the name of Sauvé Street. The section inside the city of Dorval has remained under the name Côte-Vertu Road (Chemin de la Côte-Vertu).

Côte-Vertu station, the western terminus station of the Montreal Metro's Orange Line is located at the corner of Côte-Vertu Boulevard and Décarie Boulevard. Nearby is the Terminus Côte-Vertu for various bus lines of the Société de transport de Montréal (STM) also located on Côte-Vertu Boulevard.

== Origin of the name ==
Similar to the naming of Côte-de-Liesse Road (French: Chemin de la Côte-de-Liesse), the name evokes a pilgrimage site in France dedicated to Notre-Dame. The Sulpicians would name various locales of the Island of Montreal in honor of the Blessed Virgin for whom they have great devotion.
