= Des Sources station =

REM station in Pointe-Claire, Quebec, Canada

Des Sources
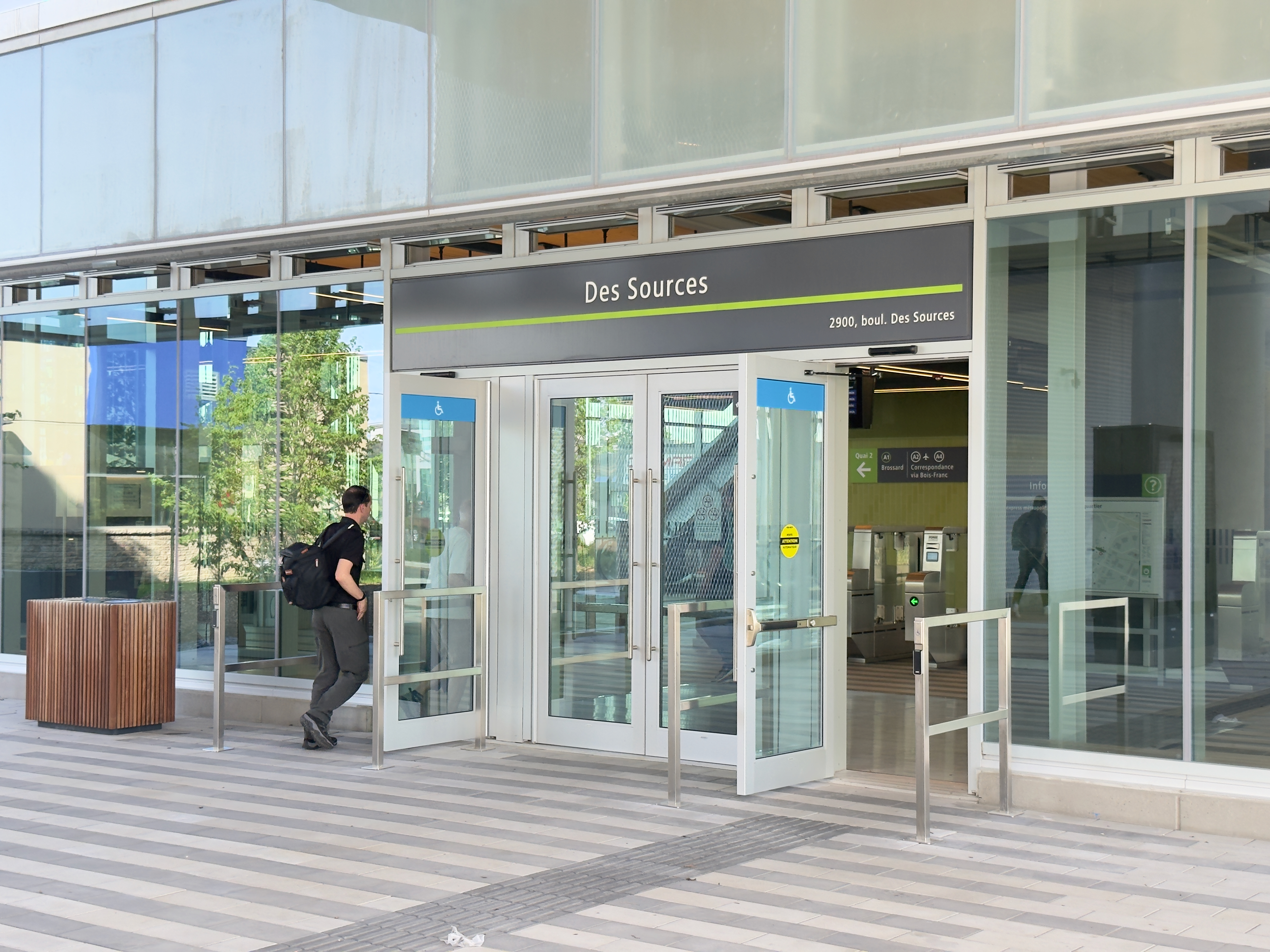
- Station entrance

General information
- Location: Des Sources Boulevard, Pointe-Claire; Quebec; Canada
- Coordinates: 45.4773°N 73.7910°W
- Operator: Pulsar (AtkinsRéalis and Alstom)
- Platforms: 2 side platforms
- Tracks: 2
- Connections: STM bus

Construction
- Structure type: Elevated
- Parking: 484 spaces
- Accessible: Yes

Other information
- Station code: DSO
- Fare zone: ARTM: A

History
- Opened: 18 May 2026; 5 months ago

Services
Preceding station	REM	Following station
Fairview–Pointe-Claire toward Anse-à-l'Orme	Réseau express métropolitain	Bois-Franc toward Brossard
Location

Des Sources (pronounced [de suʁs]) is a Réseau express métropolitain (REM) station in the city of Pointe-Claire, Quebec, Canada, which opened on 18 May 2026. It is operated by CDPQ Infra and serves as a station of the Anse-à-l'Orme branch of the REM. The site is near the intersection of Des Sources Boulevard, its namesake, and Hymus Boulevard.

== Connecting bus routes ==
Société de transport de Montréal
No.	Route	Connects to	Service times / notes
72	Alfred-Nobel	Côte-Vertu; Fairview-Pointe-Claire	Weekdays only
204	Cardinal	Pine Beach; Valois; Dorval	Daily
209	Des Sources / YUL Aéroport	Pierrefonds-Roxboro; Dorval	Daily Connects to Montréal-Trudeau International Airport
216	Transcanadienne	Côte-Vertu	Weekdays, peak only
225	Hymus	Côte-Vertu; Fairview-Pointe-Claire	Weekdays, peak only
230	Saint-Louis	Fairview-Pointe-Claire; Cedar Park	Daily
356 ☾	Lachine / YUL Aéroport / Des Sources	Frontenac; Atwater; Montréal-Ouest; Du Canal; Dorval; Sunnybrooke; Pierrefonds-Roxboro	Night service Connects to Montréal-Trudeau International Airport
524	REM Anse-à-l'Orme / Kirkland / Fairview-Pointe-Claire / Des Sources / Bois-Franc	Anse-à-l'Orme; Kirkland; Fairview-Pointe-Claire; Bois-Franc	Used in case of a service disruption on the REM
525	REM Anse-à-l'Orme / Kirkland / Fairview-Pointe-Claire / Des Sources / Côte-Vertu	Anse-à-l'Orme; Kirkland; Fairview-Pointe-Claire; Côte-Vertu	Used in case of a service disruption on the REM
528	REM Fairview-Pointe-Claire / Des Sources / Côte-Vertu	Fairview-Pointe-Claire; Côte-Vertu	Used in case of a service disruption on the REM
TA ♿︎	STM Transport adapté		
