= Fairview–Pointe-Claire station =

REM station in Pointe-Claire, Quebec, Canada

Fairview–Pointe-Claire
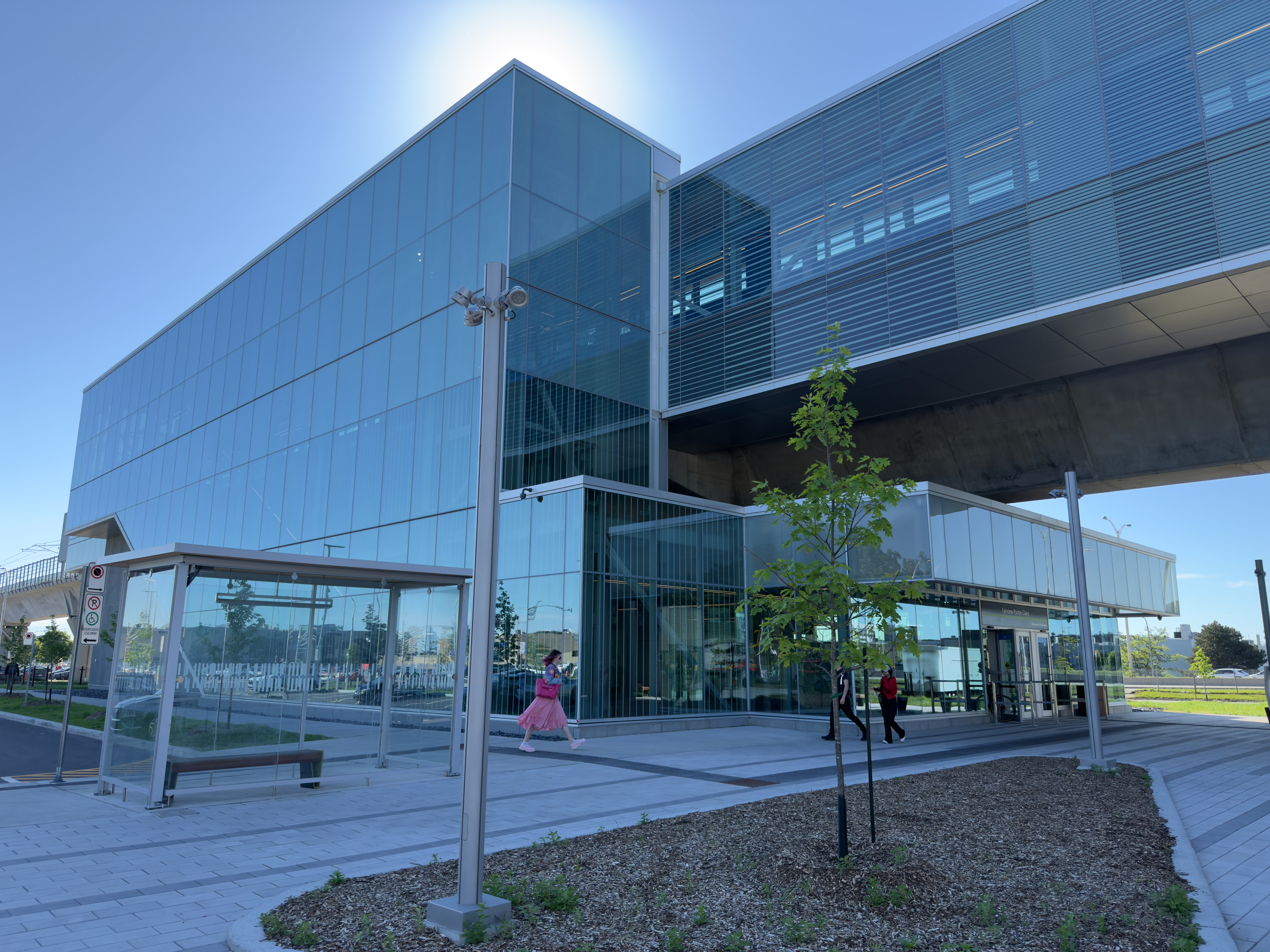
- View of station from in front of entrance

General information
- Location: Fairview Avenue, Pointe-Claire, Quebec; Canada
- Coordinates: 45.4599°N 73.8352°W (approx.)
- Operator: Pulsar (AtkinsRéalis and Alstom)
- Platforms: 2 side platforms
- Tracks: 2
- Connections: STM bus

Construction
- Structure type: Elevated
- Parking: 300
- Accessible: Yes

Other information
- Station code: PTC
- Fare zone: ARTM: A

History
- Opened: 18 May 2026; 4 months ago

Services
Preceding station	REM	Following station
Kirkland toward Anse-à-l'Orme	Réseau express métropolitain	Des Sources toward Brossard
Location

Fairview–Pointe-Claire is a Réseau express métropolitain (REM) station in Pointe-Claire, Quebec, Canada. It is operated by CDPQ Infra, and serves as a station of the Anse-à-l'Orme branch of the REM. It opened on 18 May 2026.

It could promote the implementation of a transit-oriented development (TOD). However, the station was built in the parking lot of the eponymous Fairview Pointe-Claire shopping mall where there is very little nearby residential housing, at a time of critical housing shortage. A TOD maximizes the amount of space within walking distance of public transport. It promotes sustainable urbanization by reducing the use of private cars.

Cadillac Fairview is proposing to replace 900 parking spots with hundreds of residential units, a seniors' home, and open public areas. As of the second quarter of 2022 the project has been "frozen" by Pointe-Claire city council. The mayor, elected in the 2021 Quebec municipal elections, campaigned on a platform of opposing development.

== Terminus Fairview–Pointe-Claire ==
The station has an adjoining ARTM bus terminal called Terminus Fairview–Pointe-Claire, with 16 platforms. It replaces an older bus station called Terminus Fairview north of the shopping centre.

Société de transport de Montréal
No.	Route	Connects to	Service times / notes	Terminus wing and gate
72	Alfred-Nobel	Côte-Vertu; Des Sources	Weekdays only	B-07
200	Sainte-Anne-de-Bellevue	Beaconsfield	Daily	A-02
202	Dawson	Côte-de-Liesse; Du Collège; Dorval; Cedar Park	Daily	A-04
203	Carson	Pointe-Claire; Valois; Dorval	Daily	A-03
205	Gouin	Pierrefonds-Roxboro	Daily	B-13
206	Roger-Pilon	Pierrefonds-Roxboro	Daily	B-14
207	Jacques-Bizard		Daily	B-11
208	Brunswick	Pierrefonds-Roxboro; Sunnybrooke	Daily	B-15
215	Henri-Bourassa / Brunswick	Côte-Vertu; Bois-Franc	Daily	B-16
218	Antoine-Faucon		Daily	B-09
221	Saint-Jean	Beaconsfield; Cedar Park	Daily	A-01
225	Hymus	Côte-Vertu; Des Sources	Weekdays, peak only	B-08
227	Île-Bizard		Weekdays, peak only	B-12
229	Transcanadienne / Brunswick	Anse-à-l'Orme; Kirkland	Weekdays only	B-10
230	Saint-Louis	Cedar Park; Des Sources	Daily	Side Road
470	Express Pierrefonds	Côte-Vertu	Daily	Side Road
523	REM Anse-à-l'Orme / Kirkland / Fairview-Pointe-Claire	Anse-à-l'Orme; Kirkland	Used in case of a service disruption on the REM	
524	REM Anse-à-l'Orme / Kirkland / Fairview-Pointe-Claire / Des Sources / Bois-Franc	Anse-à-l'Orme; Kirkland; Des Sources; Bois-Franc	Used in case of a service disruption on the REM	
525	REM Anse-à-l'Orme / Kirkland / Fairview-Pointe-Claire / Des Sources / Côte-Vertu	Anse-à-l'Orme; Kirkland; Des Sources; Côte-Vertu	Used in case of a service disruption on the REM	
528	REM Fairview-Pointe-Claire / Des Sources / Côte-Vertu	Des Sources; Côte-Vertu	Used in case of a service disruption on the REM	
TA ♿︎	STM Transport adapté			Taxi
