= Dorval station (Exo) =

Railway station in Montreal, Quebec, Canada

Dorval
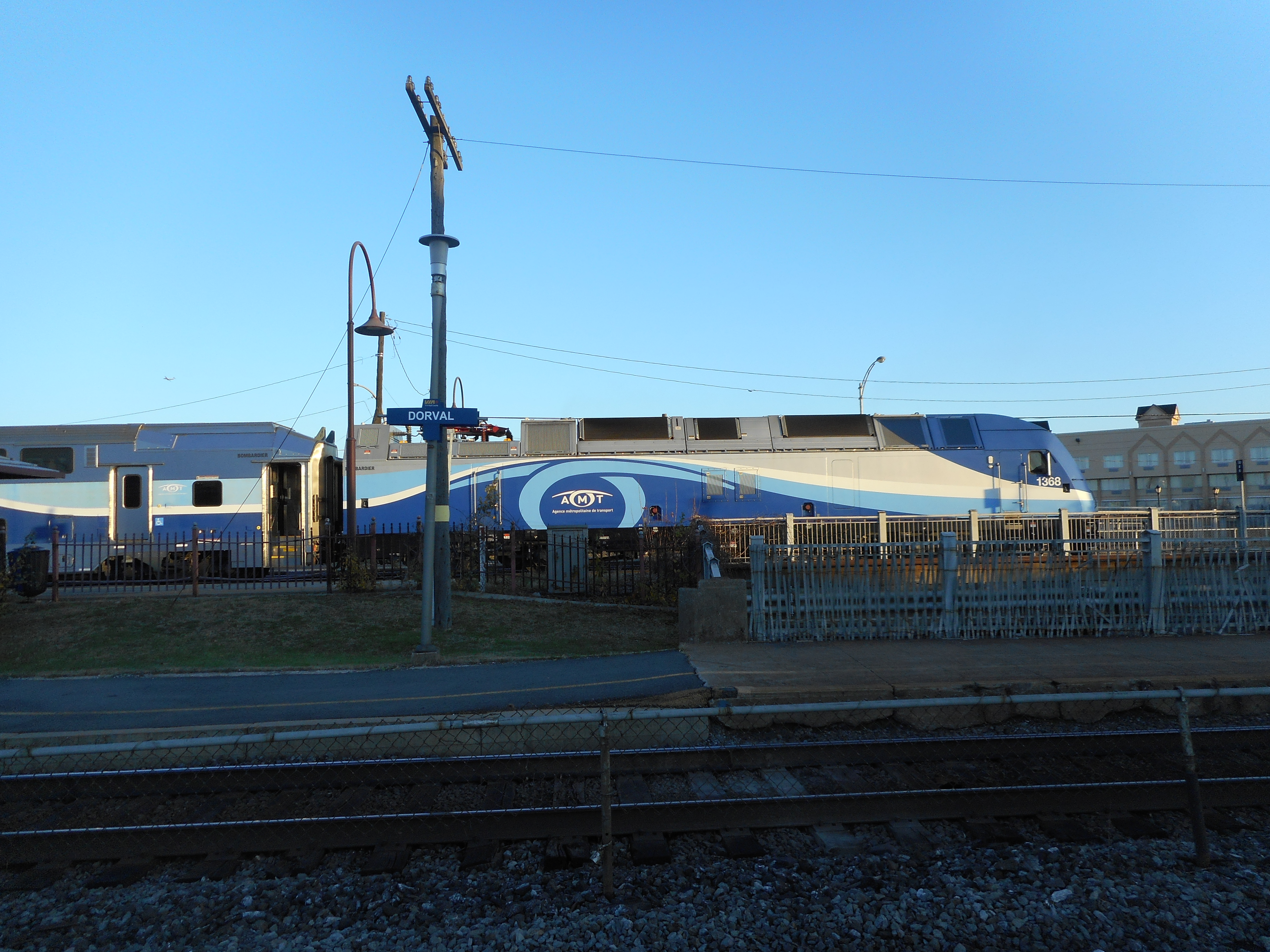

General information
- Location: 900 Cardinal Avenue; Dorval, Quebec H9P 1C5
- Coordinates: 45°26′57″N 73°44′36″W
- Operator: Exo
- Platforms: 2 side platforms
- Tracks: 2
- Connections: Terminus Dorval; Dorval (Via Rail)

Construction
- Parking: 372 Park-and-Ride and 2 Carpooling
- Cycle facilities: 43 spaces

Other information
- Fare zone: ARTM: A
- Website: Dorval station (exo.quebec)

History
- Opened: 1887
- Rebuilt: 1988

Passengers
- 2019: 258,700 (Exo)

Services
Preceding station	Exo	Following station
Pine Beach toward Hudson	Line 11 – Vaudreuil–Hudson	Lachine toward Lucien-L'Allier
Former services
Preceding station	Canadian Pacific Railway	Following station
Strathmore toward Rigaud	Montreal – Rigaud local stops	Summeriea toward Montreal Windsor
Location

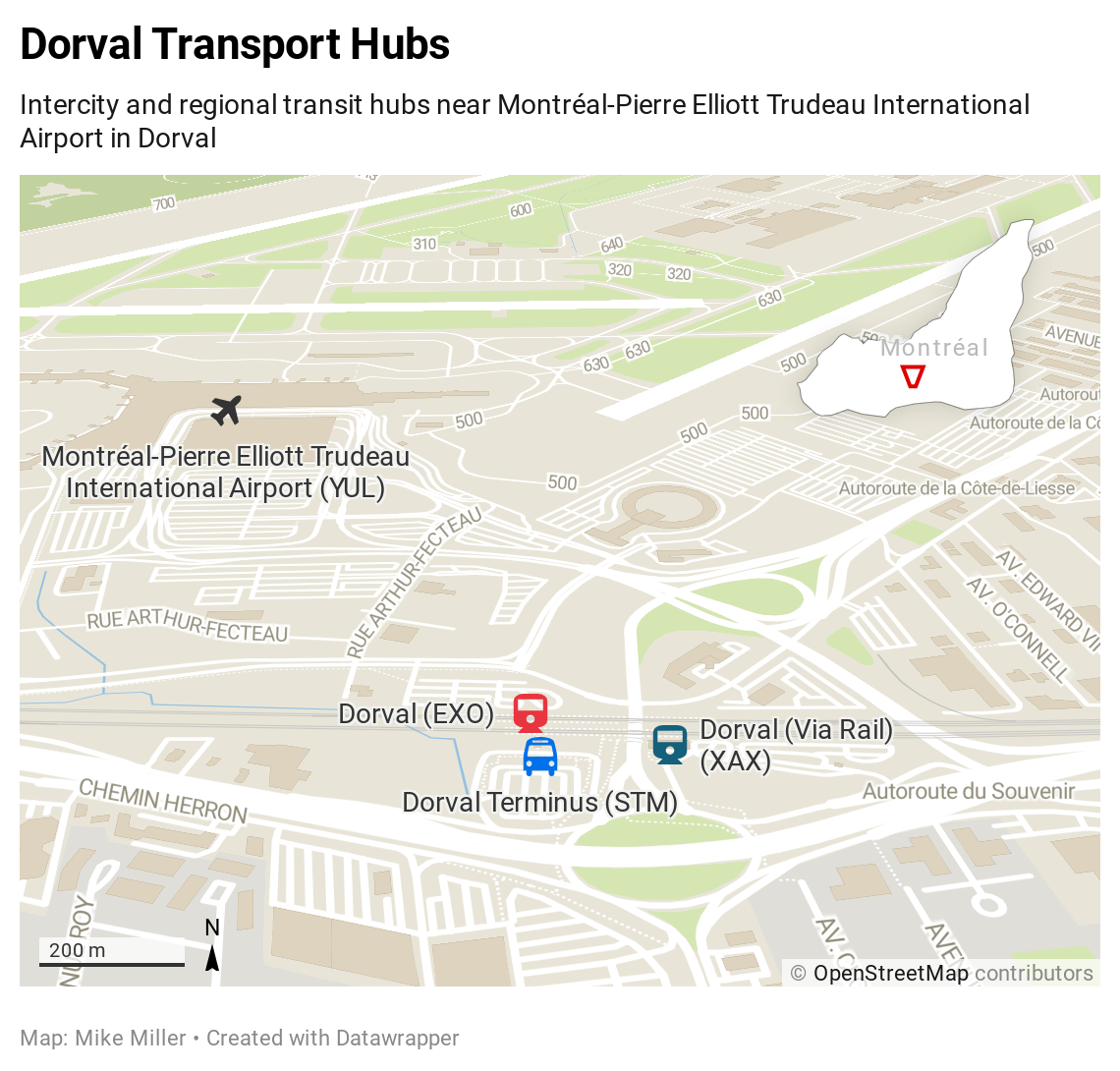
Intercity and regional transit hubs near Montréal-Pierre Elliott Trudeau International Airport in Dorval

Dorval station (French pronunciation: [dɔʁval]) is an intermodal bus and commuter rail station in Dorval, Quebec, Canada located on the Vaudreuil–Hudson line (Line 11) of the Greater Montreal Exo public transport network. It is located within walking distance to inter-city rail services at Dorval Via Rail station.

Dorval is in ARTM fare zone A, and the station currently has 372 parking spaces. The adjacent ARTM bus terminal rivals the Fairview Bus Terminal as the busiest in the West Island but serves as the main interchange and the fastest link to Downtown Montreal for West Island travelers. The 211 bus route, along with four others lines, is the quickest link to a Metro station from the West Island. Nine Metro stations are served via the Dorval bus terminal, the most of any West Island train station. Roughly 15,000 people transit through the terminus daily, or 4.14 million a year.

As of now, on weekdays, all 13 inbound trains and 14 outbound trains on the line call at this station. On weekends, all trains (four on Saturday and three on Sunday in each direction) call here.

The station is located north of Autoroute 20 alongside the Dorval Circle interchange, about one kilometre south of Montreal-Pierre Elliott Trudeau International Airport. The station has two side platforms; access between them is provided by a tunnel connecting the large headhouses on either side of the tracks with the bus terminal building to the south.

The current commuter station and bus terminal opened on August 29, 1988.

Despite the proximity of the airport, there is no direct pedestrian or transit access other than the infrequent route 204 and 460 bus. Due to the construction of the Réseau express métropolitain (REM) rapid transit link to the airport, there have been calls for the connection to be extended one kilometre south to link with the train and bus stations here.

== Connecting bus routes ==
=== Société de transport de Montréal at Terminus Dorval ===
Adjacent to the train station, there is also a bus terminus called Terminus Dorval from which multiple STM bus routes originate.

Société de transport de Montréal
No.	Route	Connects to	Service times / notes
195	Dorval / Angrignon	Angrignon	Daily
198	Broadway	Angrignon	Daily
202	Dawson	Côte-de-Liesse; Du Collège; Cedar Park; Fairview-Pointe-Claire	Daily
203	Carson	Fairview-Pointe-Claire; Pointe-Claire; Valois	Daily
204	Cardinal	Des Sources; Pine Beach; Valois	Daily
209	Des Sources / YUL Aéroport	Pierrefonds-Roxboro; Des Sources	Daily Connects to Montréal-Trudeau International Airport
211	Bord-du-Lac	Kirkland; Beaconsfield; Pine Beach; Pointe-Claire; Lionel-Groulx	Daily
214	Stuart-Graham / YUL Aéroport		Daily Connects to Montréal-Trudeau International Airport
293	Parc industriel Lachine - Gare Dorval		Daily
354 ☾	Sainte-Anne-de-Bellevue / Centre-ville	Atwater; Pointe-Claire; Beaconsfield; Beaurepaire; Baie d'Urfé; Sainte-Anne-de-Bellevue	Night service
356 ☾	Lachine / YUL Aéroport / Des Sources	Frontenac; Atwater; Montréal-Ouest; Du Canal; Des Sources; Sunnybrooke; Pierrefonds-Roxboro	Night service Connects to Montréal-Trudeau International Airport
378 ☾	Sauvé / YUL Aéroport	Sauvé; Montpellier; Côte-Vertu; Du Collège	Night service Connects to Montréal–Trudeau International Airport
411	Express Lionel-Groulx	Pointe-Claire; Pine Beach; Lionel-Groulx	Daily
460	Express Métropolitaine	Crémazie; De La Savane (eastbound); Du Collège (westbound)	Weekdays only Certain trips start or end at Montréal-Trudeau International Airport
496	Express Victoria	Lionel-Groulx	Daily

== Nearby points of interest ==
- Montréal-Pierre Elliott Trudeau International Airport
- Jardins Dorval
