= Cedar Park station =

Railway station in Montreal, Quebec, Canada

Cedar Park
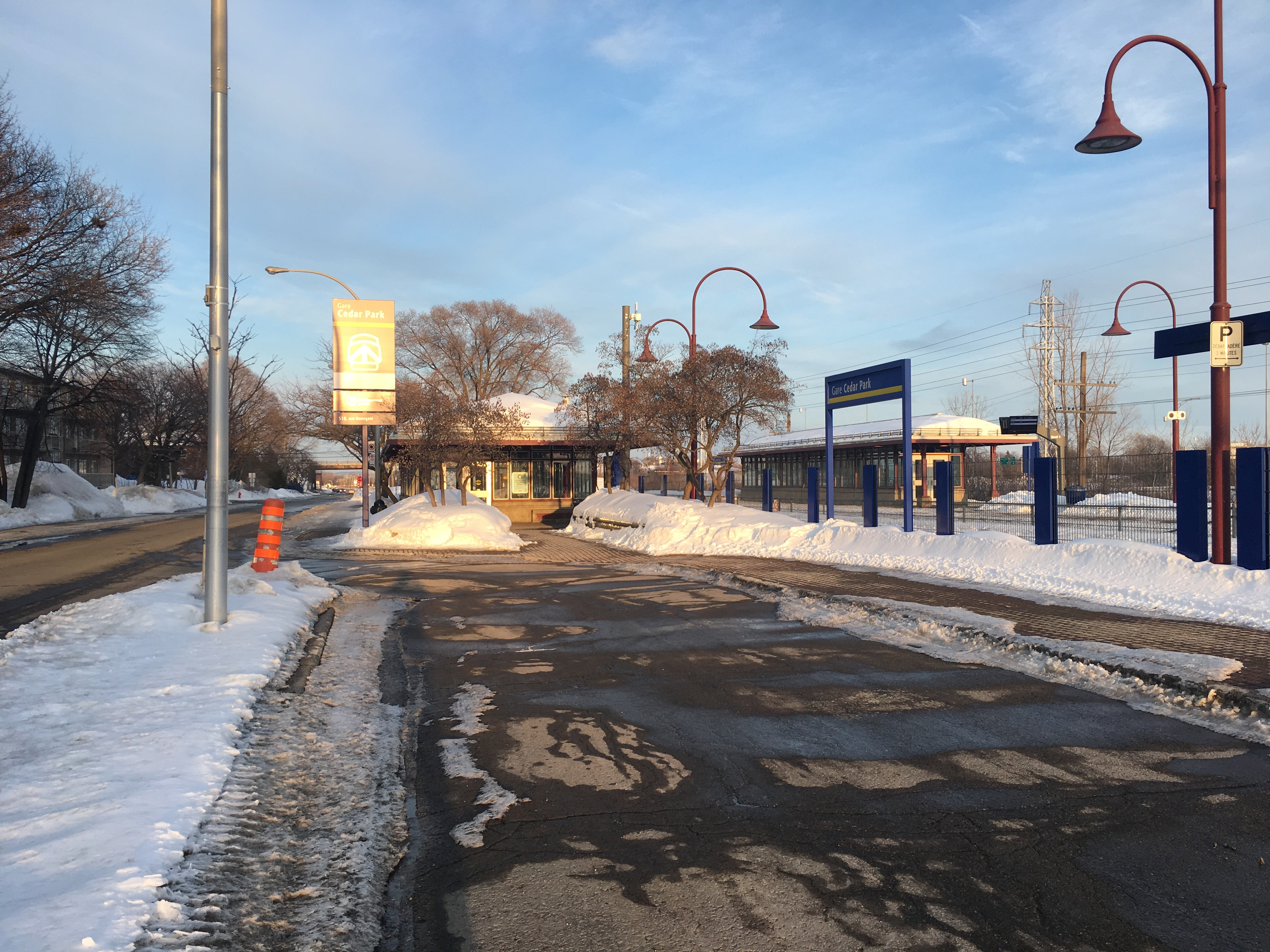
- Entrance at the Cedar Park train station

General information
- Location: 518 Donegani Avenue; Pointe-Claire, Quebec H9R 2W8
- Coordinates: 45°26′33″N 73°49′12″W
- Operator: Exo
- Platforms: 2 side platforms
- Tracks: 2
- Connections: STM bus

Construction
- Parking: 28 Park-and-Ride spaces
- Cycle facilities: 49 spaces

Other information
- Fare zone: ARTM: A
- Website: Cedar Park Station (RTM)

Passengers
- 2019: 231,400 (Exo)

Services
Preceding station	Exo	Following station
Beaconsfield toward Hudson	Line 11 – Vaudreuil–Hudson	Pointe-Claire toward Lucien-L'Allier
Former services
Preceding station	Canadian Pacific Railway	Following station
Pointe Claire toward Rigaud	Montreal – Rigaud local stops	Lakeside toward Montreal Windsor
Location

Cedar Park station is a commuter rail station operated by Exo in Pointe-Claire, Quebec. It is served by Exo line 11 - Vaudreuil/Hudson.

As of October 2020, on weekdays, 10 of 11 inbound trains and 10 of 12 outbound trains on the line call at this station; the others skip this stop. On weekends, all trains (four on Saturday and three on Sunday in each direction) call here.

The station is located north of Autoroute 20, about 250 m west of Boulevard Saint-Jean. It has two side platforms; access between them is provided by a walkway tunnel with a headhouse on either side. The tunnel also gives access to an open-air walkway south of the station that passes under the highway and two of its ramps to connect with Cedar Avenue on the south side of the highway.

A station was located here by 1909.

== Connecting bus routes ==
Société de transport de Montréal
No.	Route	Connects to	Service times / notes
202	Dawson	Côte-de-Liesse; Du Collège; Dorval; Fairview-Pointe-Claire	Daily
221	Saint-Jean	Fairview-Pointe-Claire; Beaconsfield	Daily
230	Saint-Louis	Fairview-Pointe-Claire; Des Sources	Weekdays, peak only
