= Valois station =

Railway station in Montreal, Quebec, Canada

Valois
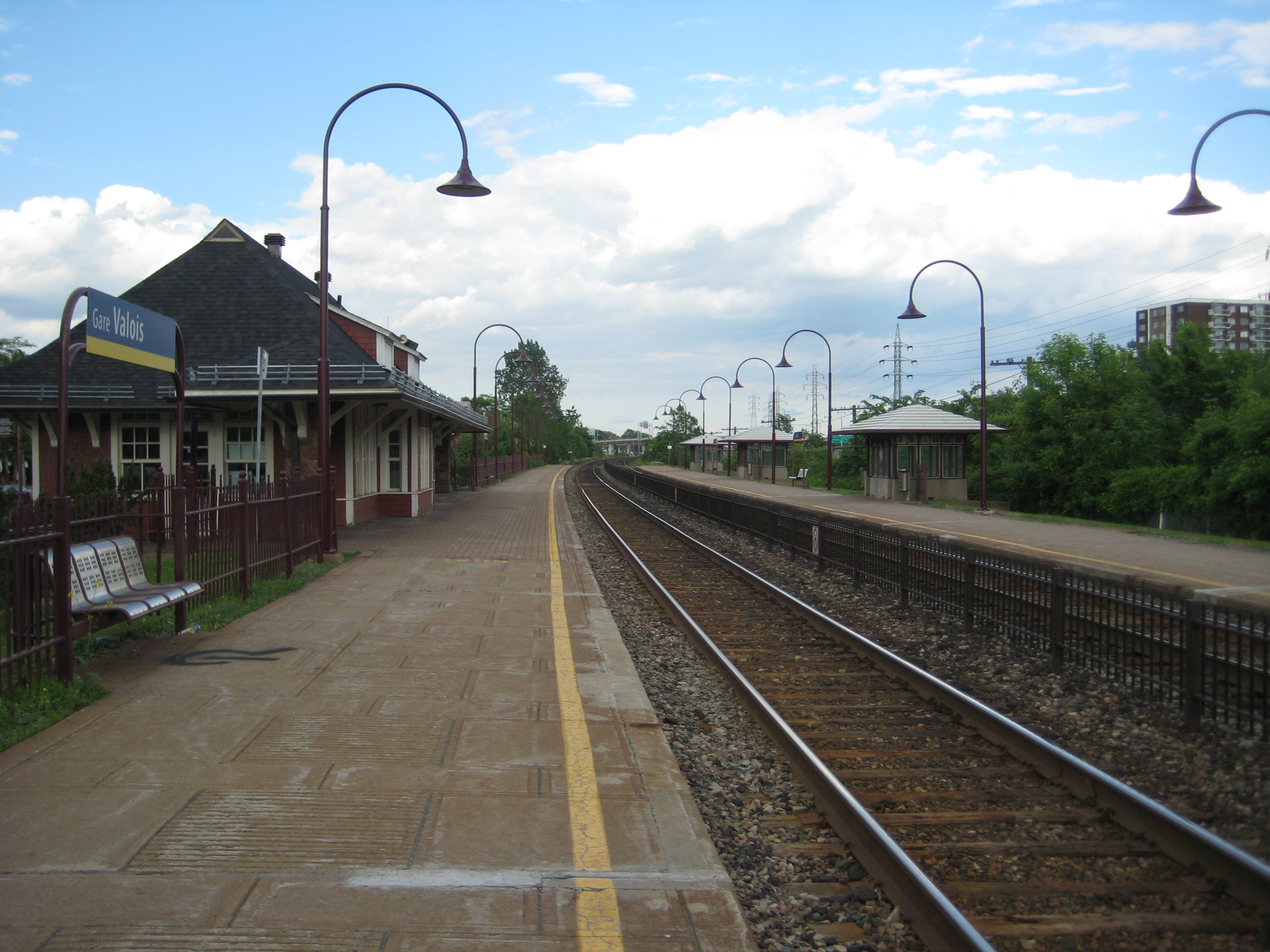

General information
- Location: 114 Donegani Avenue; Pointe-Claire, Quebec H9R 2V4
- Coordinates: 45°26′59″N 73°47′27″W
- Operator: Exo
- Platforms: 2 side platforms
- Tracks: 2
- Connections: STM bus; STM taxibus

Construction
- Parking: 145 Park-and-Ride and 2 Disabled spaces
- Cycle facilities: 46 spaces

Other information
- Fare zone: ARTM: A
- Website: Valois Station (RTM)

Passengers
- 2019: 305,200 (Exo)

Services
| Preceding station | Exo | Following station |
|---|---|---|
| Pointe-Claire toward Hudson | Line 11 – Vaudreuil–Hudson | Pine Beach toward Lucien-L'Allier |
Former services
| Preceding station | Canadian Pacific Railway | Following station |
|---|---|---|
| Lakeside toward Rigaud | Montreal – Rigaud local stops | Strathmore toward Montreal Windsor |
Location

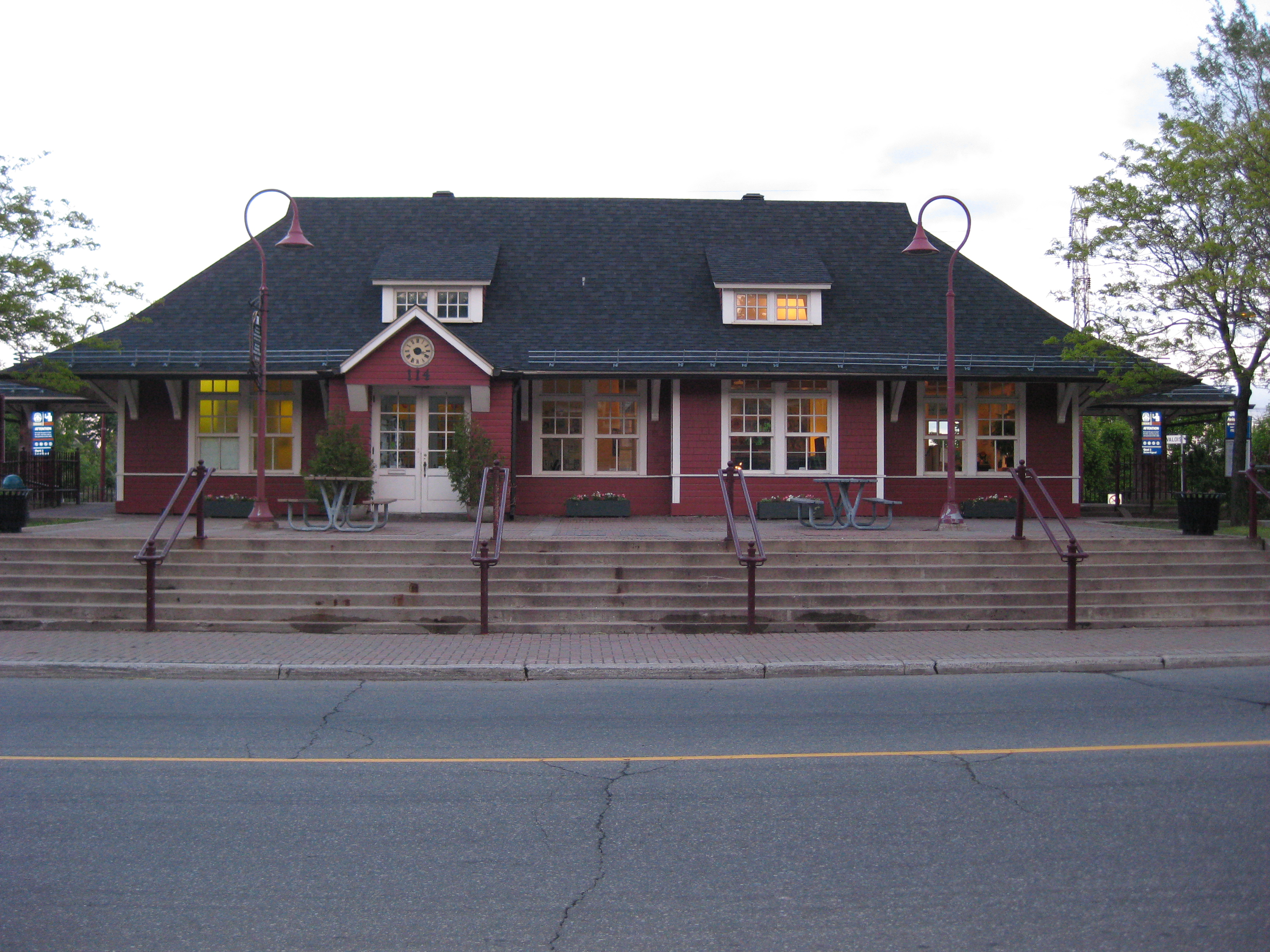
Valois railway station

Valois station (French pronunciation: [valwa]) is a commuter rail station operated by Exo in Pointe-Claire, Quebec, Canada, located in the Valois neighborhood. It is served by the Vaudreuil–Hudson line.

As of October 2020, on weekdays, 10 of 11 inbound trains and 10 of 12 outbound trains on the line call at this station, with the others skipping it. On weekends, all trains (four on Saturday and three on Sunday in each direction) call here.

The station is located north of Autoroute 20 at the corner of Avenue Donegani and Avenue de la Baie-de-Valois. The original station building is extant but is no longer in passenger service; instead, it is used by a community resource centre. The station has two side platforms; access between them is provided by a tunnel with headhouses on either side of the tracks and a third located south of the highway. In 2016, the station became the first one on this line to possess its own work of art. The MU artistic organization arranged the creation of a mural on and inside the northern headhouse: L'empreinte de l'homme by Ilana Pichon.

This station was open by 1889; the modern underpass was opened in 1980.

== Connecting bus routes ==
Société de transport de Montréal
| No. | Route | Connects to | Service times / notes |
|---|---|---|---|
| 203 | Carson | Fairview-Pointe-Claire; Pointe-Claire; Dorval | Daily |
| 204 | Cardinal | Des Sources; Pine Beach; Dorval | Daily |
| 270 | 270 Pointe-Claire - Navette Or by taxi | Fairview-Pointe-Claire | |
