= Beaconsfield station (Exo) =

Railway station in Montreal, Quebec, Canada

Beaconsfield
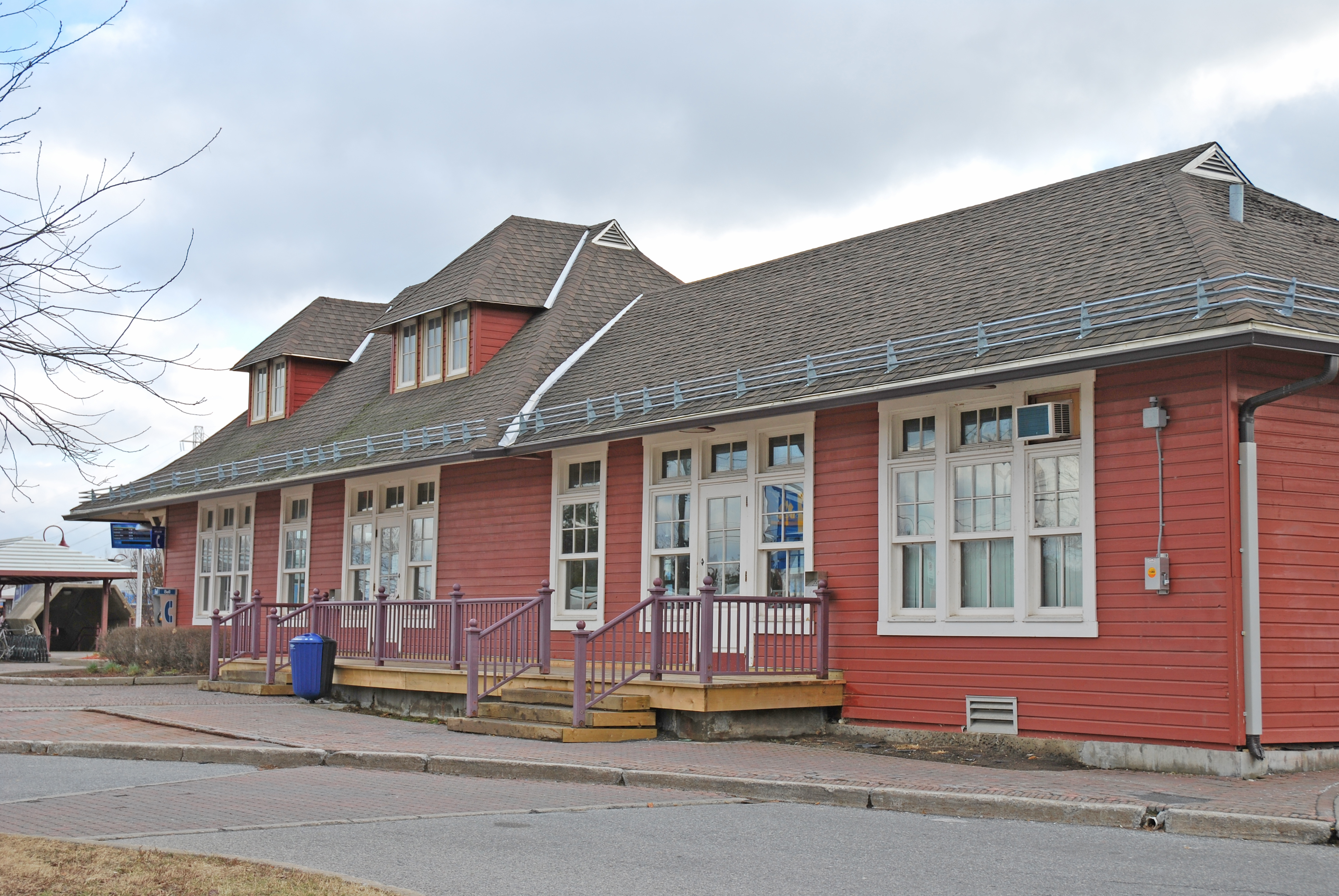

General information
- Location: 104 Elm Avenue; Beaconsfield, Quebec H9W 2C8
- Coordinates: 45°26′06″N 73°50′50″W
- Operator: Exo
- Platforms: 2 side platforms
- Tracks: 2
- Connections: STM bus

Construction
- Parking: 452 Park-and-Ride and 4 Disabled spaces
- Cycle facilities: 83 spaces

Other information
- Fare zone: ARTM: A
- Website: Beaconsfield Station (RTM)

Passengers
- 2019: 785,300

Services
Preceding station	Exo	Following station
Beaurepaire toward Hudson	Line 11 – Vaudreuil–Hudson	Cedar Park toward Lucien-L'Allier
Former services
Preceding station	Canadian Pacific Railway	Following station
Beaurepaire toward Rigaud	Montreal – Rigaud local stops	Pointe Claire toward Montreal Windsor
Location

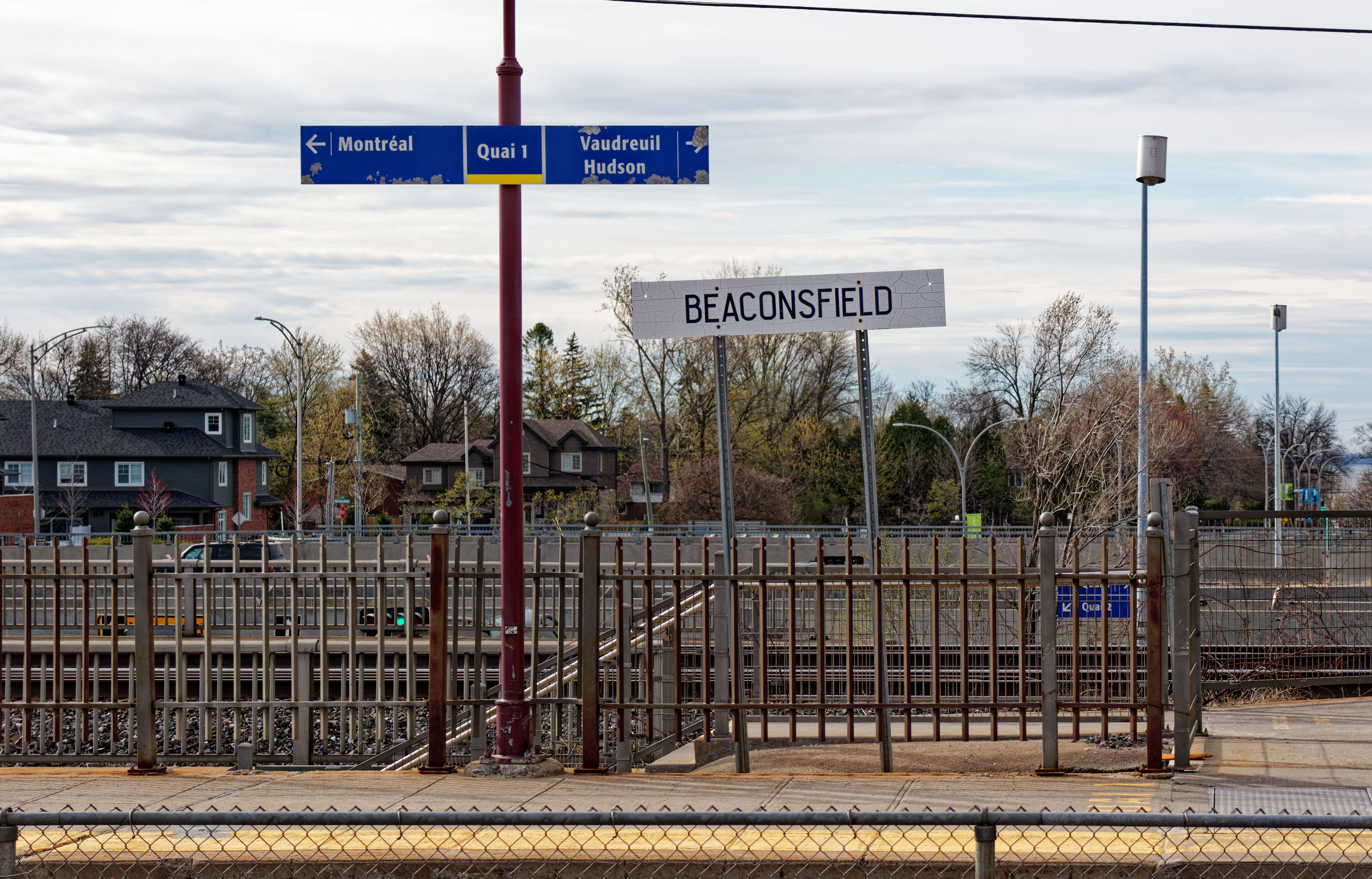
Station platform, 2023

Beaconsfield station is a commuter rail station operated by Exo in Beaconsfield, Quebec, Canada. It is served by the Vaudreuil–Hudson line.

As of October 2020, on weekdays, all 11 inbound trains and 12 outbound trains on the line call at this station, with one train each way short turning here. On weekends, all trains (four on Saturday and three on Sunday in each direction) call here.

The station platforms are built on an overpass over Saint-Charles Boulevard, north of Autoroute 20. The historic station building is one of just two still serving passengers along this line (the other is Montréal-Ouest); a few more are extant but have been given over to other uses. In particular, a dedicated underpass between the station building and a headhouse links the two platforms. They are also linked by the sidewalks on both sides of Saint-Charles Boulevard and stairways leading from them to the platforms.

== Connecting bus routes ==
Société de transport de Montréal
No.	Route	Connects to	Service times / notes
200	Sainte-Anne-de-Bellevue	Fairview-Pointe-Claire	Daily
201	Saint-Charles		Daily
211	Bord-du-Lac	Kirkland; Pine Beach; Pointe-Claire; Dorval; Lionel-Groulx	Daily
221	Saint-Jean	Fairview-Pointe-Claire; Cedar Park	Daily
354 ☾	Sainte-Anne-de-Bellevue / Centre-ville	Atwater; Dorval; Pointe-Claire; Beaurepaire; Baie d'Urfé; Sainte-Anne-de-Bellevue	Night service
382 ☾	Pierrefonds / Saint-Charles	Namur; De La Savane; Du Collège; Côte-Vertu; Bois-Franc; Sunnybrooke; Pierrefonds-Roxboro	Night service
