= Kirkland station =

REM station in Kirkland, Quebec, Canada

Kirkland
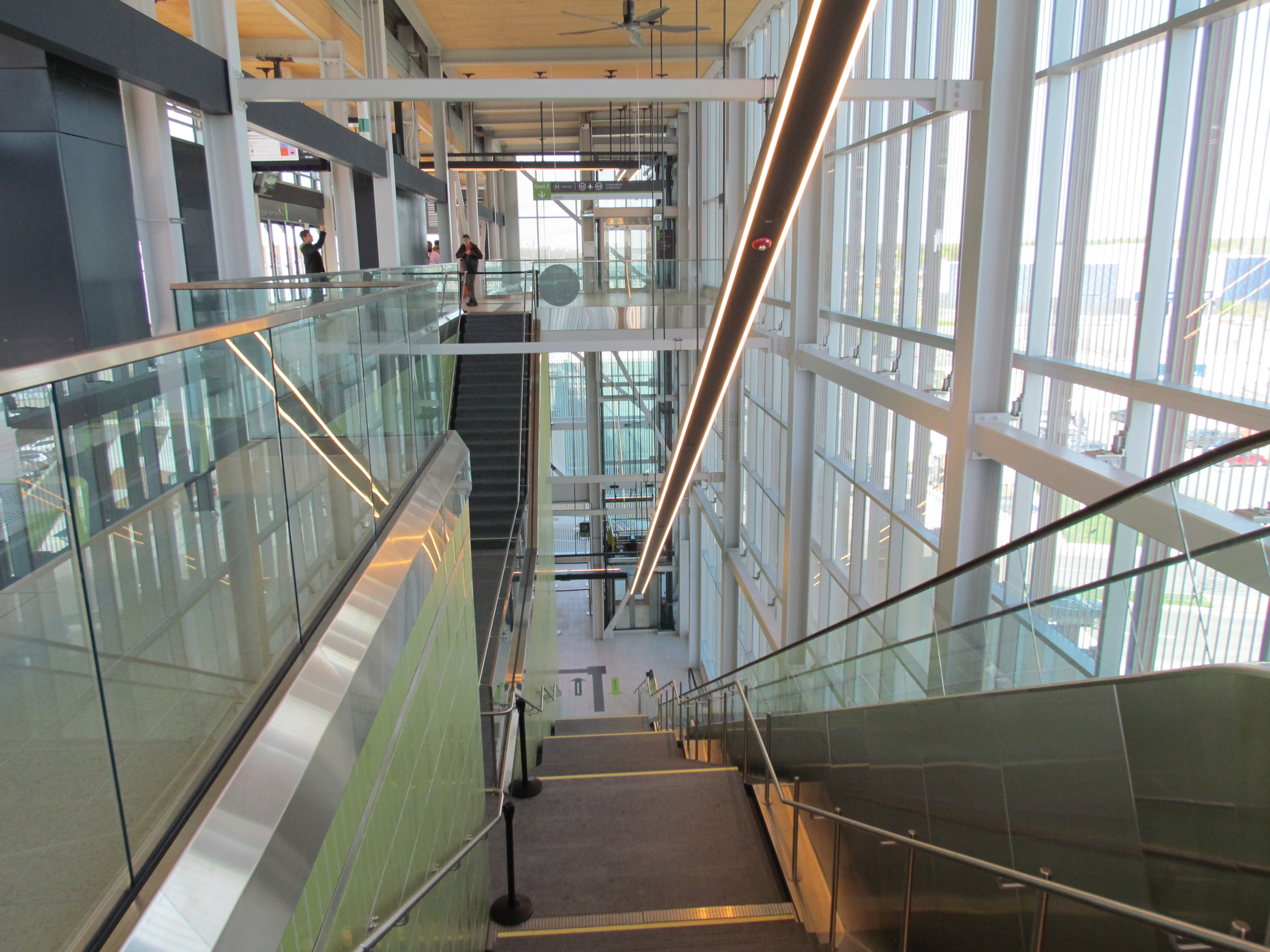
- Stairs from Platform 1 (westbound) to the mezzanine

General information
- Location: Jean-Yves Street, Kirkland; Quebec; Canada
- Coordinates: 45.4403°N 73.8858°W (approx.)
- Operator: Pulsar (AtkinsRéalis and Alstom)
- Platforms: 2 side platforms
- Tracks: 2
- Connections: STM bus

Construction
- Structure type: Elevated
- Parking: None
- Accessible: Yes

Other information
- Station code: JYV
- Fare zone: ARTM: A

History
- Opened: 18 May 2026; 3 months ago

Services
Preceding station	REM	Following station
Anse-à-l'Orme Terminus	Réseau express métropolitain	Fairview–Pointe-Claire toward Brossard
Location

Kirkland is a Réseau express métropolitain (REM) station in the city of Kirkland, Quebec, Canada. It is operated by CDPQ Infra, and serves as a station of the Anse-à-l'Orme branch of the REM. It opened on 18 May 2026.

== Connecting bus routes ==
Société de transport de Montréal
No.	Route	Connects to	Service times / notes
211	Bord-du-Lac	Beaconsfield; Pine Beach; Pointe-Claire; Dorval; Lionel-Groulx	Daily
229	Transcanadienne / Brunswick	Anse-à-l'Orme; Fairview-Pointe-Claire	Weekdays only
521	REM Anse-à-l'Orme / Kirkland / Côte-Vertu	Anse-à-l'Orme; Côte-Vertu	Used in case of a service disruption on the REM
523	REM Anse-à-l'Orme / Kirkland / Fairview-Pointe-Claire	Anse-à-l'Orme; Fairview-Pointe-Claire	Used in case of a service disruption on the REM
524	REM Anse-à-l'Orme / Kirkland / Fairview-Pointe-Claire / Des Sources / Bois-Franc	Anse-à-l'Orme; Fairview-Pointe-Claire; Des Sources; Bois-Franc	Used in case of a service disruption on the REM
525	REM Anse-à-l'Orme / Kirkland / Fairview-Pointe-Claire / Des Sources / Côte-Vertu	Anse-à-l'Orme; Fairview-Pointe-Claire; Des Sources; Côte-Vertu	Used in case of a service disruption on the REM
TA ♿︎	STM Transport adapté		
