= Pierrefonds-Roxboro station =

REM station in Montreal, Quebec, Canada

Pierrefonds-Roxboro
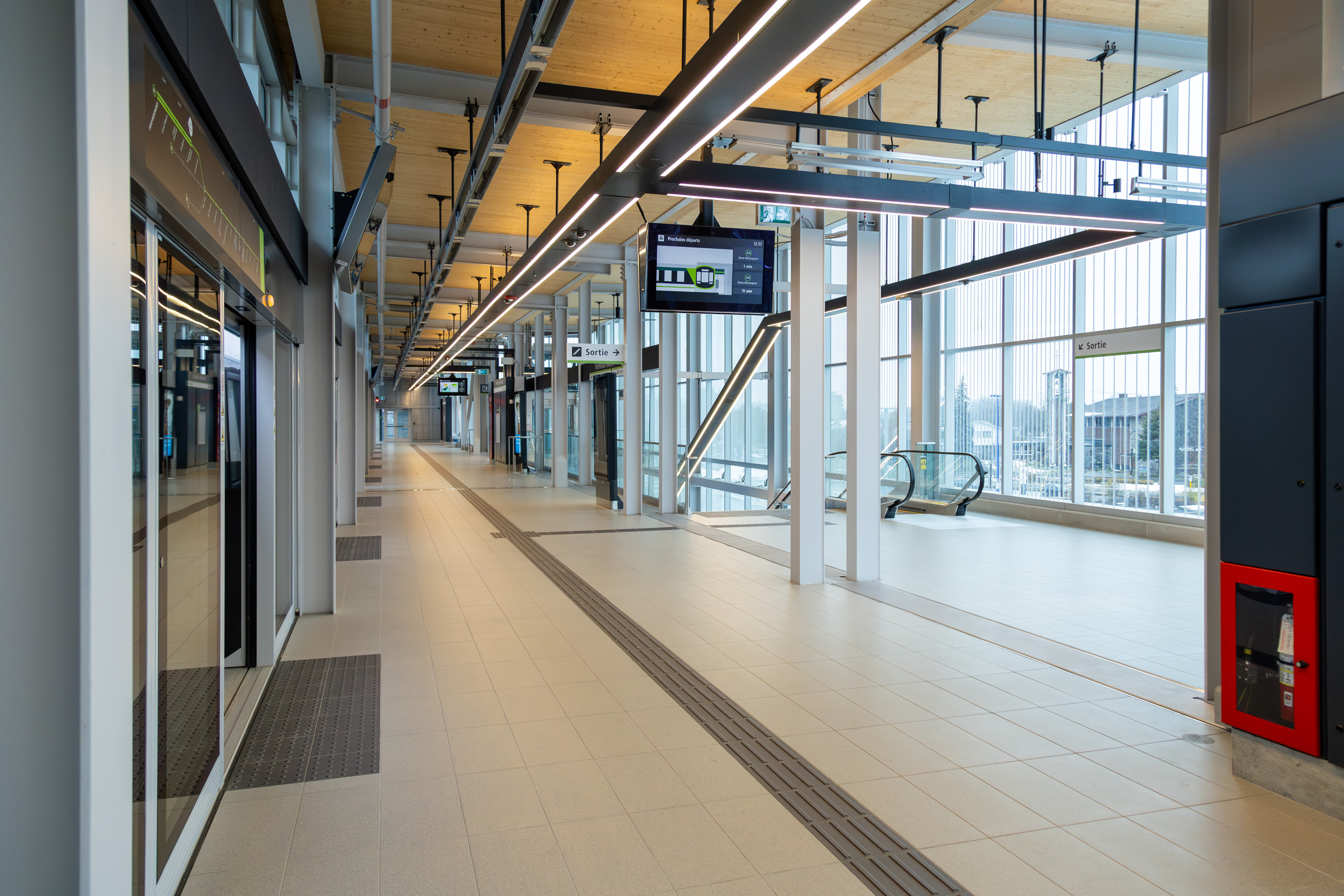
- Pierrefonds-Roxboro station platform

General information
- Location: 11100 Gouin Boulevard West; Montreal, Quebec; Canada
- Coordinates: 45°30′33″N 73°48′34″W
- Operator: Pulsar (AtkinsRéalis and Alstom)
- Platforms: 2 side platforms
- Tracks: 2
- Connections: STM bus

Construction
- Structure type: Elevated
- Parking: 901 spaces
- Cycle facilities: 80 spaces
- Accessible: Yes

Other information
- Station code: ROX
- Fare zone: ARTM: A
- Website: rem.info/en/travelling/stations/pierrefonds-roxboro

History
- Opened: 1944 (modernized in 1994)
- Closed: December 31, 2020
- Rebuilt: November 17, 2025
- Electrified: 1,500 V DC catenary
- Former names: Roxboro; Roxboro-Pierrefonds

Passengers
- 2019: 1,086,000 (Exo)

Services
Preceding station	REM	Following station
Île-Bigras toward Deux-Montagnes	Réseau express métropolitain	Sunnybrooke toward Brossard
Former services
Preceding station	Exo	Following station
Île-Bigras toward Deux-Montagnes	Deux-Montagnes	Sunnybrooke toward Montreal
Location

Pierrefonds-Roxboro (French pronunciation: [pjɛʁfɔ̃ʁɔksbɔʁo]) is a Réseau express métropolitain (REM) station that opened on 17 November 2025. The REM station replaced a commuter train station named Roxboro-Pierrefonds on the Deux-Montagnes line of the Exo network, which closed in 2020.

== History ==
The railway station was originally named Roxboro, and was built as part of Canadian Northern Railway's line from Montreal to Deux-Montagnes via the Mount Royal Tunnel. It handled passengers, mail, and freight. Roxboro Station burned down in 1932 and was not immediately rebuilt. Instead the stop moved approximately one-half mile (0.8 km) west to where the railway crossed Gouin Boulevard West. This station was known as Ste-Genevieve. By 1944 the stop had returned to its original site and was once more known as Roxboro. The new, small station no longer handled freight.

In the 1990s, the station was modernized as part of the electrification of the Deux-Montagnes line, and renamed Roxboro-Pierrefonds.

In May 2020, the station was closed, to allow the line to be converted to the REM. The new station was renamed from Roxboro-Pierrefonds to Pierrefonds-Roxboro, to match the name of the borough of Pierrefonds-Roxboro.

== Location ==
The station is located in the former city of Roxboro in the Pierrefonds-Roxboro borough of Montreal, at 11100 Gouin Boulevard West. The platforms can also be accessed from the east where the line crosses Rue du Centre-Commercial (11th Avenue).

== Connecting bus routes ==
Société de transport de Montréal
No.	Route	Connects to	Service times / notes
68	Pierrefonds	Anse-à-l'Orme; Sunnybrooke	Daily Connects to Cap-Saint-Jacques Nature Park, only certain trips end at Anse-à-l'Orme station.
79	Gouin	Henri-Bourassa	Daily
205	Gouin	Fairview-Pointe-Claire	Daily
206	Roger-Pilon	Fairview-Pointe-Claire	Daily
208	Brunswick	Sunnybrooke; Fairview-Pointe-Claire	Daily
209	Des Sources / YUL Aéroport	Des Sources; Dorval	Daily Connects to Montréal-Trudeau International Airport
356 ☾	Lachine / YUL Aéroport / Des Sources	Frontenac; Atwater; Montréal-Ouest; Du Canal; Dorval; Des Sources; Sunnybrooke	Night service Connects to Montréal-Trudeau International Airport
382 ☾	Pierrefonds / Saint-Charles	Namur; De La Savane; Du Collège; Côte-Vertu; Bois-Franc; Sunnybrooke; Beaconsfield	Night service
468	Express Pierrefonds / Gouin	Côte-Vertu; Sunnybrooke	Daily
TA ♿︎	STM Transport adapté		
