= Pine Beach station =

Railway station in Montreal, Quebec, Canada

Pine Beach
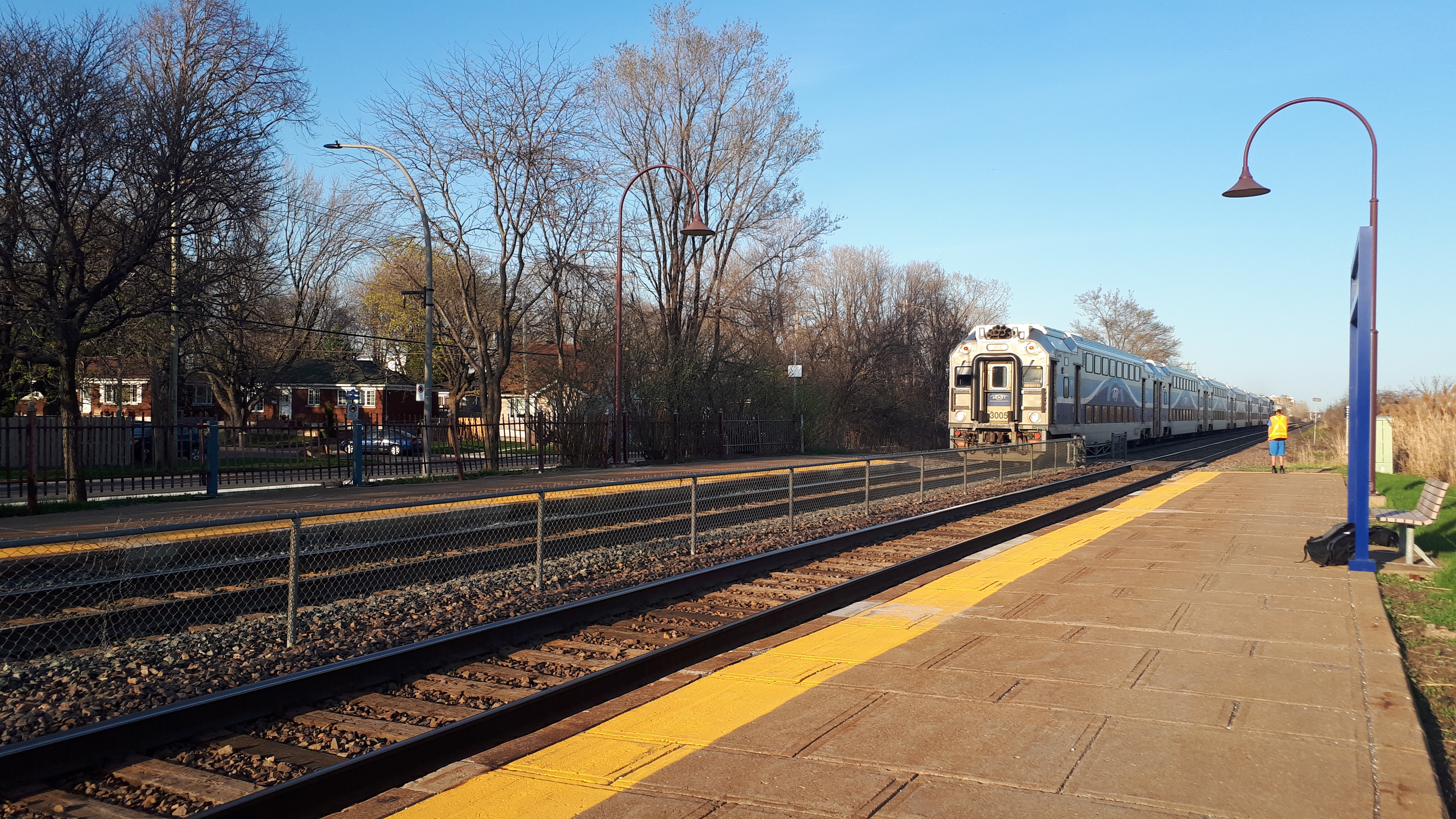

General information
- Location: 1600 Cardinal Avenue; Dorval, Quebec H9P 2W4
- Coordinates: 45°26′59″N 73°45′51″W
- Operator: Exo
- Platforms: 2 side platforms
- Tracks: 2
- Connections: STM bus; STM taxibus

Construction
- Parking: None
- Cycle facilities: 30 spaces

Other information
- Fare zone: ARTM: A
- Website: Pine Beach Station (RTM)

Passengers
- 2019: 169,900 (Exo)

Services
Preceding station	Exo	Following station
Valois toward Hudson	Line 11 – Vaudreuil–Hudson	Dorval toward Lucien-L'Allier
Location

Pine Beach station is a commuter rail station operated by Exo in Dorval, Quebec, Canada, located in the Pine Beach neighbourhood. It is served by the Vaudreuil–Hudson line.

As of October 2020, on weekdays, 10 of 11 inbound trains and 10 of 12 outbound trains on the line call at this station, with the others skipping it. On weekends, all trains (four on Saturday and three on Sunday in each direction) call here.

The station is located north of Autoroute 20 at the corner of Avenue Cardinal and Boulevard Pine Beach. The station possesses shelters but no station building. The station has two side platforms; access between them is provided by a tunnel with headhouses on either side of the tracks, a third on the north side of the highway (adjacent to a bus stop), and a fourth on the south side of the highway.

A station named Bel Air was open at this location in the 1890s, but closed thereafter. Pine Beach station entered service by 1953.

== Connecting bus routes ==
Société de transport de Montréal
No.	Route	Connects to	Service times / notes
204	Cardinal	Des Sources; Valois; Dorval	Daily Serves both directions north of the station and southbound south of the station.
211	Bord-du-Lac	Kirkland; Beaconsfield; Pointe-Claire; Dorval; Lionel-Groulx	Daily
271	271 Dorval - Navette Or by taxi		
411	Express Lionel-Groulx	Pointe-Claire; Dorval; Lionel-Groulx	Daily
