= Côte-Vertu station =

Montreal Metro station in Quebec, Canada

Côte-Vertu
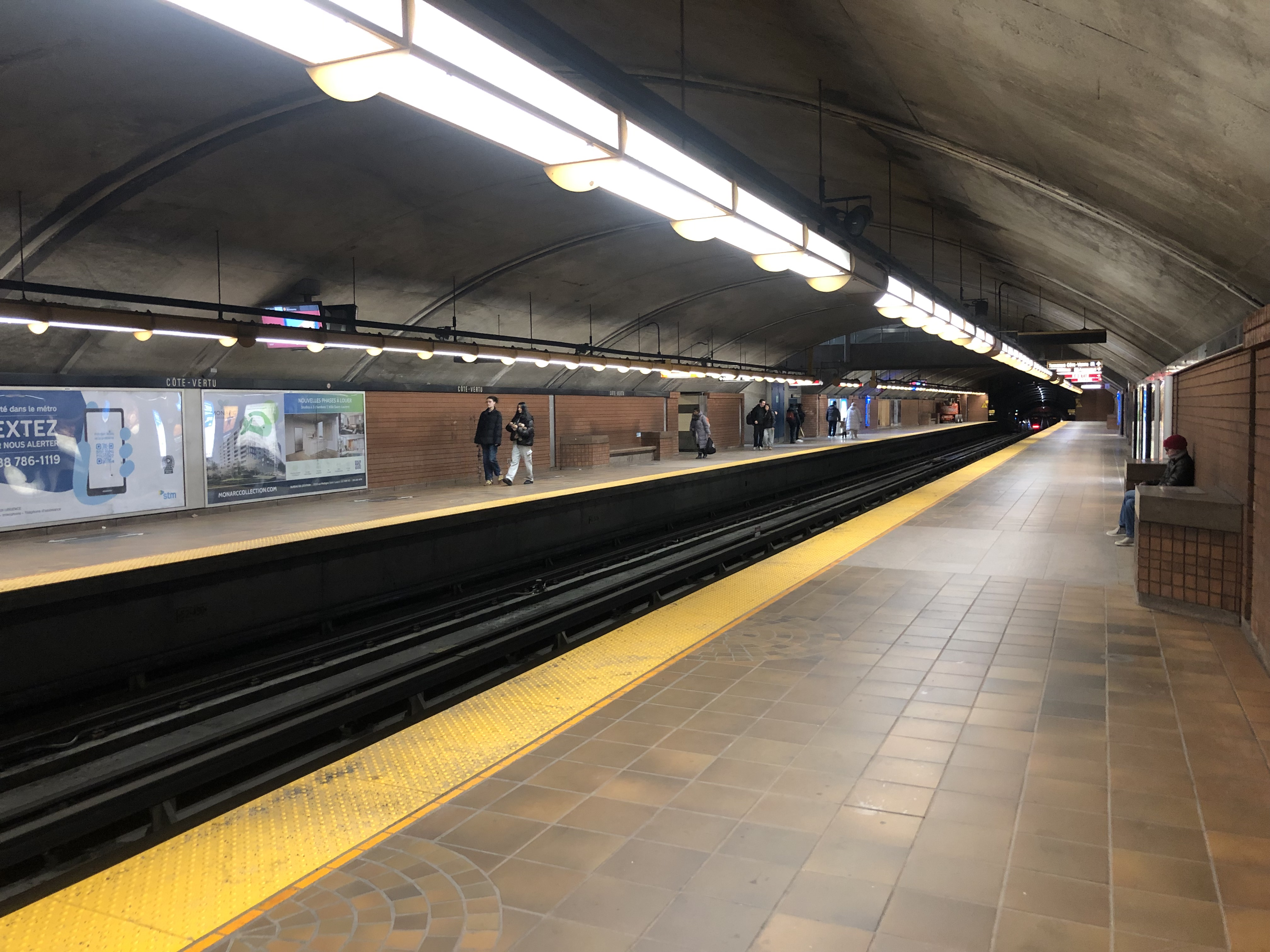

General information
- Location: 1010 Rue Décarie, Saint-Laurent, Montréal, QC H4L 4W2; Canada
- Coordinates: 45°30′51″N 73°40′59″W
- Operator: Société de transport de Montréal
- Platforms: 2 side platforms
- Tracks: 2
- Connections: Terminus Côte-Vertu

Construction
- Depth: 17.7 metres (58 feet 1 inch), 20th deepest
- Accessible: Yes
- Architect: Jodoin, Lamarre, Pratte, & Co; Cayouette & Saia

Other information
- Fare zone: ARTM: A

History
- Opened: 3 November 1986

Passengers
- 2024: 7,675,271 ▲12.14%
- Rank: 4 of 68

Services
Preceding station	Montreal Metro	Following station
Terminus	Orange Line	Du Collège toward Montmorency
Location

Côte-Vertu station is a Montreal Metro station in the borough of Saint-Laurent in Montreal, Quebec, Canada. It is operated by the Société de transport de Montréal (STM) and serves the Orange Line. It opened on November 3, 1986 and has been the western terminus of the Orange Line since that date, having taken over from Du Collège station.

== Overview ==
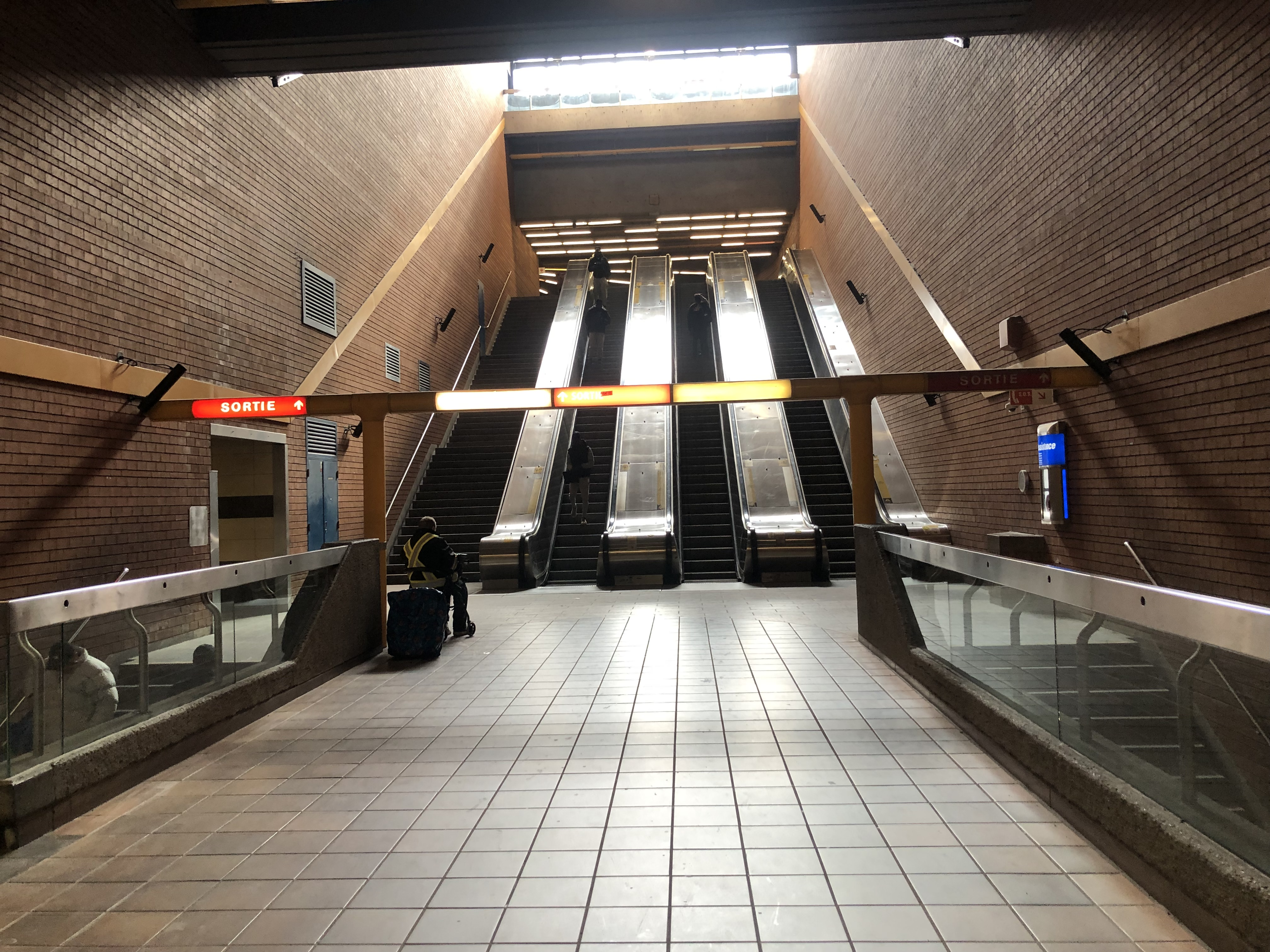
Escalator of the station

The station is a normal side platform station with one transept, a mezzanine, and three entrances.

The station was designed by the architectural firms of Jodoin, Lamarre, Pratte, & Co and Cayouette & Saia. It contains two artworks: a set of two mural sculptures by Yves Trudeau in the transept, entitled Relief, négatif positif, and a mural by Éric Lamontagne in the new bus terminus, entitled L'Homo urbanus.

It was originally intended as a temporary terminus, to be followed by a two to three station extension to a point somewhat beyond the current Bois-Franc commuter train station; however, this never took place. Because this station was intended to be a temporary terminus, the passenger accesses are much too small. During rush hour it can take several minutes for the platform to clear while trains arrive only two minutes apart.

As this station is the terminus for several bus routes, including three Société de transport de Laval (STL) buses, a new bus terminal around the northern entrance was completed in 2005. Three new bus shelters at the southern entrance on Edouard-Laurin Boulevard, serving the metropolitan routes, were finished at about the same time. One of these three has since been eliminated.

The station is equipped with the MétroVision information screens which displays news, commercials, and the time till the next train. In November 2010, Côte-Vertu became the 7th station to be wheelchair accessible as elevators were added.

The station underwent construction to build a new garage to increase frequency during rush hours and it was closed from May 29 to August 22, 2021 to install a track switch just south of the station to allow trains to turn back more quickly.

== Origin of name ==
This station is named for the Boulevard de la Côte-Vertu. The area through which the street runs has been known as Notre-Dame-de-Vertu, Notre-Dame-de-la-Vertu, or Notre-Dame-des-Vertus (Our Lady of Virtue) since at least 1700.

== Connecting bus routes ==
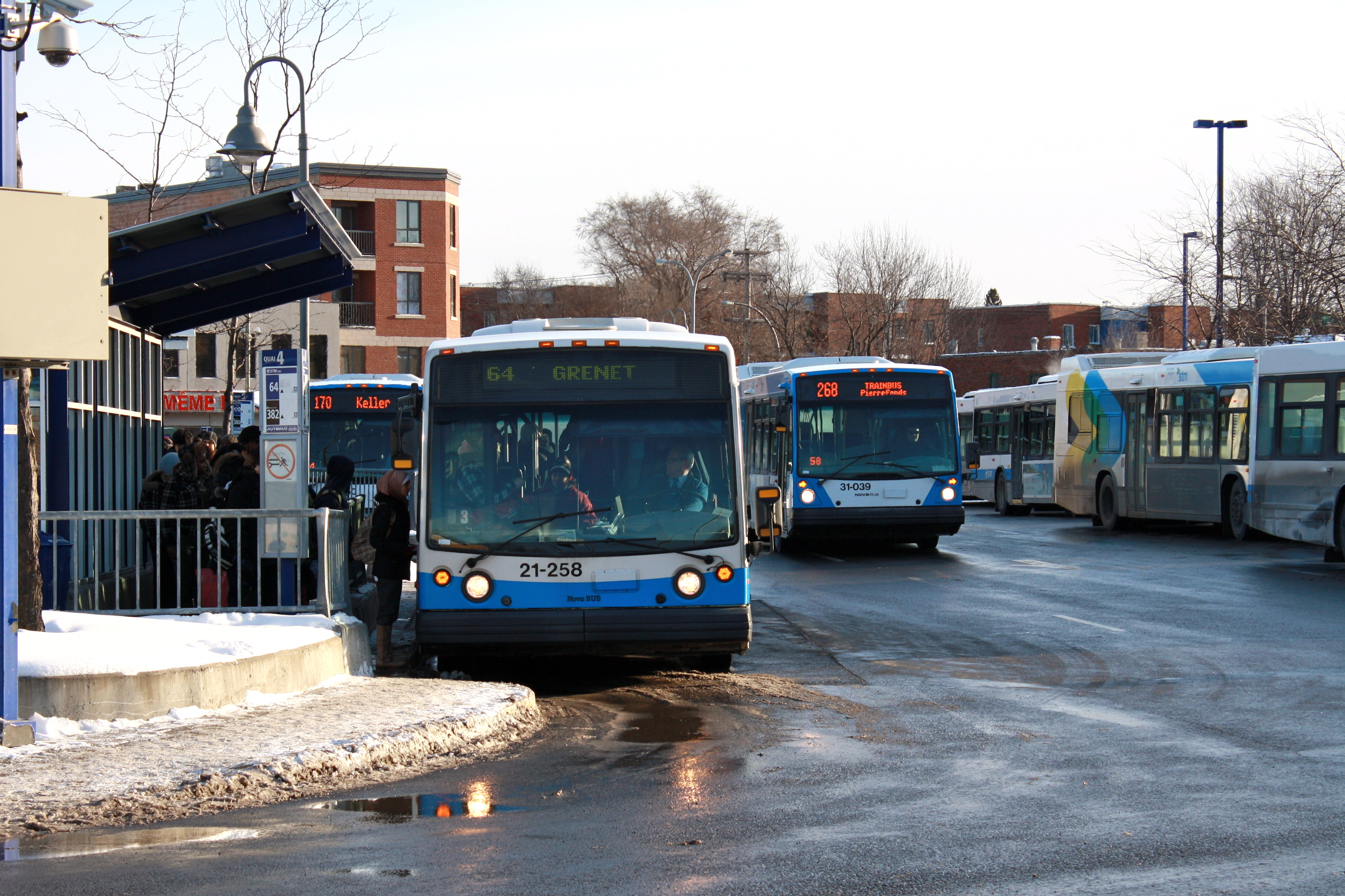
Buses loading passengers at the North Terminal.

For connecting bus routes see Terminus Côte-Vertu.

== Nearby points of interest ==
- Les Galeries Norgate
- Vanier College
- LaurenHill Academy
- Cégep de Saint-Laurent
- Place Vertu
- Décarie Hot Dogs

== See also ==
- Montreal metro Future projects
