= Westmount Square =

Residential and office complex in Westmount, Quebec

- Carré Westmount
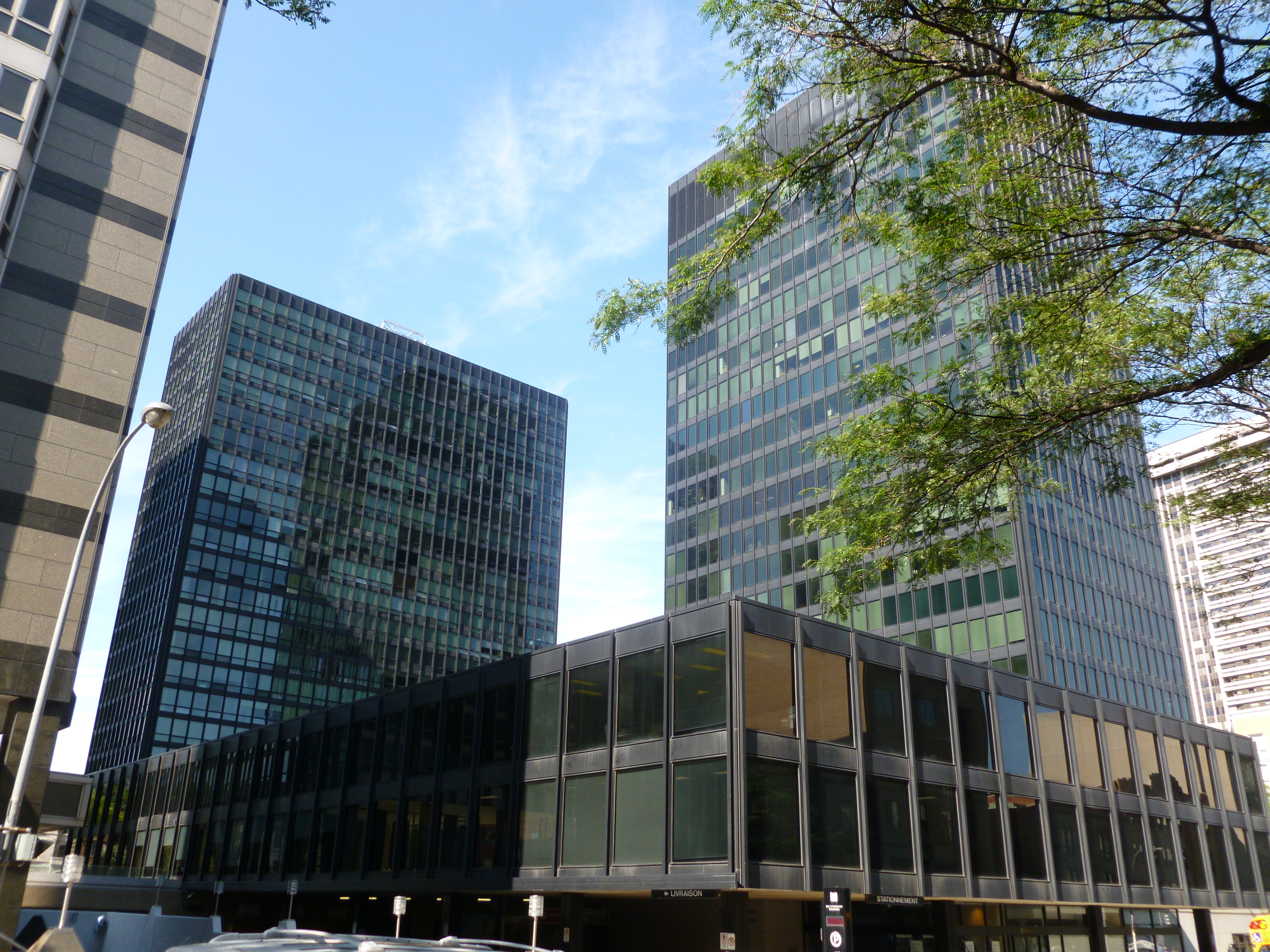
- Interactive map of the Westmount Square area

General information
- Type: Office and Residential
- Location: Westmount, Quebec, Canada
- Coordinates: 45°29′14″N 73°35′16″W
- Completed: 1967
- Owner: Creccal Investments Ltd.

Height
- Roof: 83 m (272 ft)

Technical details
- Floor count: 22
- Floor area: 30,658 m^{2} (330,000 sq ft)

Design and construction
- Architects: Ludwig Mies van der Rohe, Greenspoon, Freedlander, Dunne, Plachta & Kryton

Other information
- Public transit: Atwater; Terminus Atwater

Website
- westmount-square.ca

Westmount Square (French: Carré Westmount) is a residential and office complex located in Westmount, Quebec, Canada. There are two residential apartment buildings and two office buildings. These towers sit atop an underground shopping centre consisting of thirty-five shops. It is located between Sainte Catherine Street West and De Maisonneuve Boulevard West and between Wood Avenue and Greene Avenue. It is connected to Place Alexis Nihon, Dawson College, and the Atwater Metro station by a tunnel.

The complex was designed by architect Ludwig Mies van der Rohe in the International Style. Construction began in 1964 and the complex opened on 13 December 1967. The exterior facade features curtain walls, and is made of black anodized aluminium and smoked glass windows. It was modelled on Lake Shore Drive Apartments in Chicago.

The office building, also known as Tower 1, has 22 floors and stands 83 metres (272 ft) tall. The other office building has 2 floors and is known as the Tower 4 Pavilion; it was formerly the Eastern Airlines Building. The two residential towers each have 21 floors, and stand 69 metres (226 ft) tall.

Westmount Square's shopping concourse houses boutiques and art galleries, with about one-third of the space reserved for private for-profit health clinics. Skylights were installed on the roof of the shopping concourse in 1990, which led to criticism among architectural preservationists.

== See also ==
- List of malls in Montreal
- Nuns' Island gas station
