= Alexis Nihon Complex =

- Place Alexis Nihon
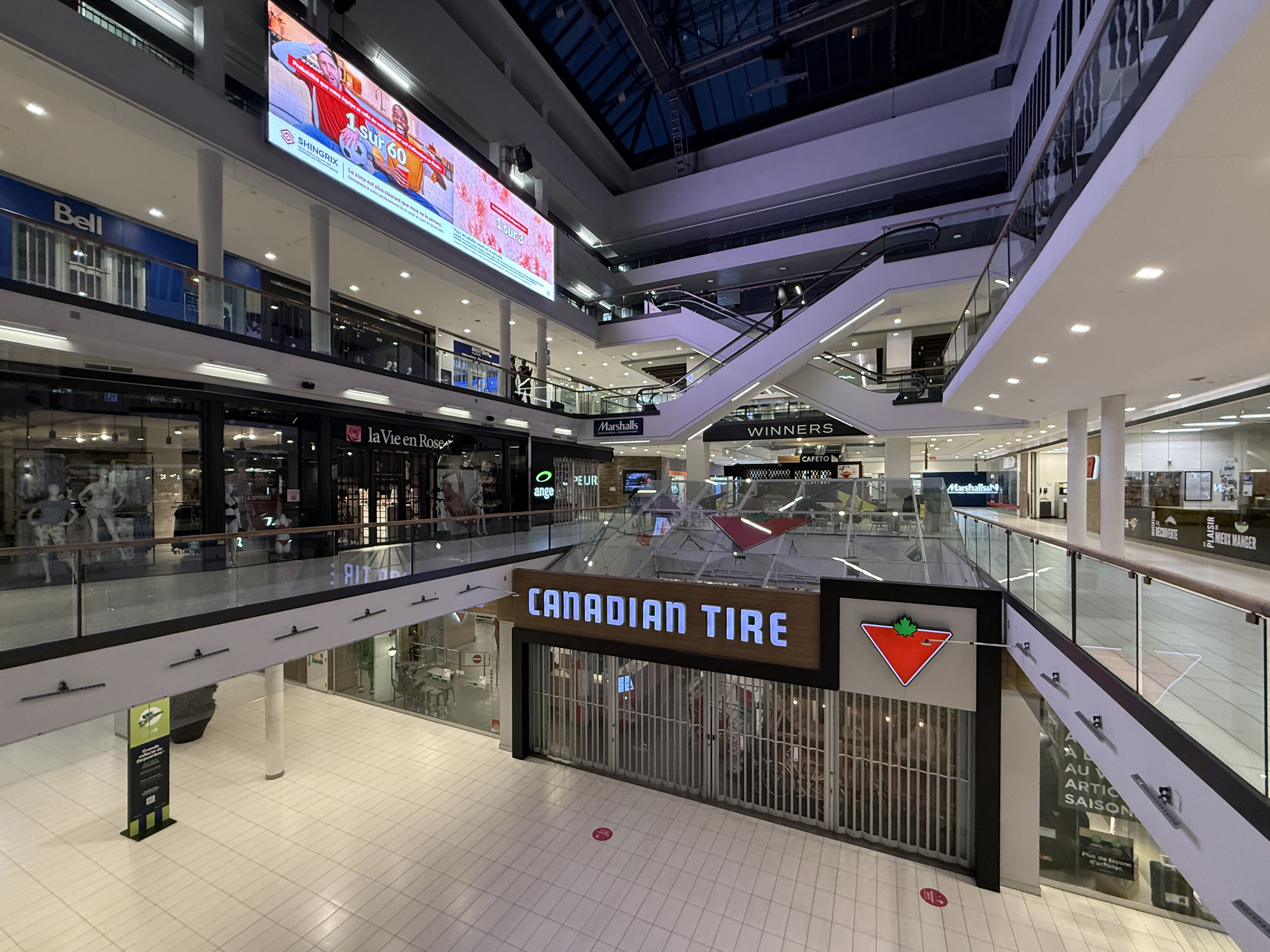
- Location: 1500 Atwater Ave. Montreal, Quebec, Canada; H3Z 1X5
- Coordinates: 45°29′20″N 73°35′9″W
- Opened: 1967
- Developer: Alexis Nihon Group (REIT)
- Manager: Cominar REIT
- Owner: Cominar REIT
- Architect: Harold Ship, master concept and plaza design, Dimitri Dimakopoulos, office building design
- Num. of stores: 100+
- Num. of anchor tenants: 5
- Floor area: 37,200 m^{2} (400,420 sq ft).
- Floors: 3
- Parking: 1,100 vehicles
- Public transit: at Atwater; Terminus Atwater
- Website: Alexis Nihon

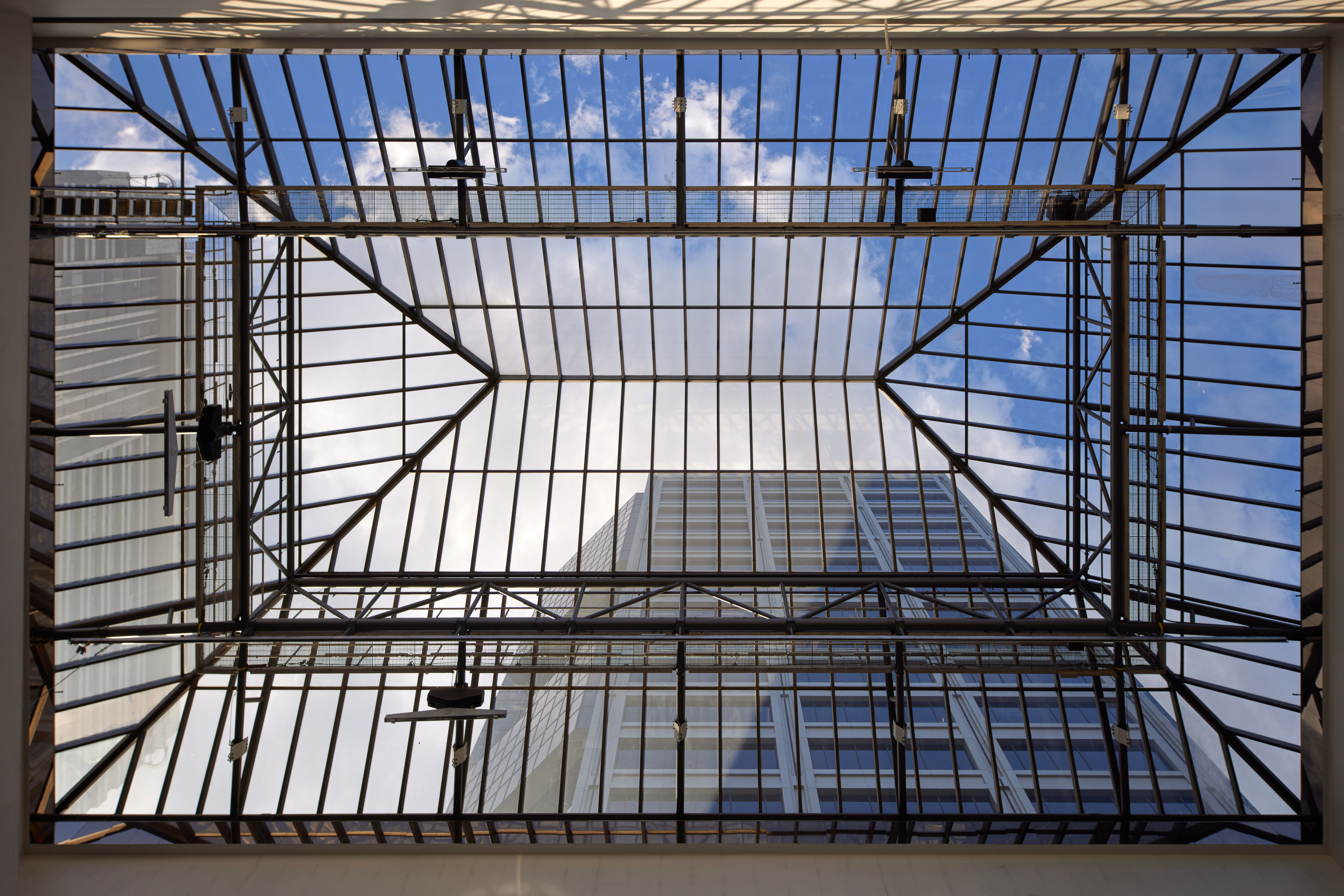
Alexis Nihon Complex before renovation (2009)

Alexis Nihon Complex (French: Complexe Alexis Nihon) is a 223,000 m^{2} (2,400,000 sq ft) building complex situated at the border of Downtown Montreal and the neighbouring city of Westmount in Quebec, Canada. It consists of a shopping mall, two office towers, and a residential building. Although the complex is typically associated with Downtown Montreal and its main entrance on Atwater Avenue is in Montreal proper, more than 80% of the land it occupies is located in Westmount. It is named after the inventor and businessman Alexis Nihon. The shopping mall is directly connected to the Atwater metro station, which joins the building by a short tunnel with the adjacent Dawson College, and by a longer one adjoins nearby Westmount Square. The original complex was designed by the Montreal architect Harold Ship, and its architectural plans are housed at the Canadian Centre for Architecture.

Construction of Alexis Nihon Plaza, as the complex was originally called, began in September 1965. The shopping mall inaugurated on April 17, 1967, but its stores didn't actually start doing business until the next day (with the notable exception of one retailer that had opened a day in advance by mistake). It was the first shopping centre in North America with three levels. The Miracle Mart store occupied all three levels of the shopping mall at 270,000 sq ft (25,000 m^{2}), making it the largest of the retailer's locations at the time. The Steinberg's supermarket was one of the largest built by the company back then. Only the shopping mall opened in April 1967 but it was already decided back then that office and high-rise apartment buildings would be added in subsequent phases.

On October 26, 1986, a major fire heavily damaged its 16-story office building and is still considered the city's biggest fire in a skyscraper. At least six stories were destroyed in the blaze. The federal government, who was a tenant of the building when the fire occurred, sued on August 18, 1988, the then-owner for $585,000, accusing them of being negligent and careless in the maintenance of the Alexis Nihon Complex. In 2002, the Service de sécurité incendie de Montréal was heavily blamed for negligence and incompetence by the Cour d'Appel du Québec in their handling of the 1986 fire. Two office towers, taller than the originals, have since been added atop the shopping complex at 3400 and 3500 De Maisonneuve Boulevard West.

During the Dawson shooting incident on September 13, 2006, the building was fully evacuated.

On April 5, 2017, a minor fire broke out near the roof of the food court. Minor damage occurred as a result.

The shopping mall portion is anchored by Canadian Tire, IGA, Sports Experts, Winners and Pharmaprix.

The block now containing the mall was once the site of Atwater Park, home of the Montreal Royals baseball team through 1927.

== Directions ==
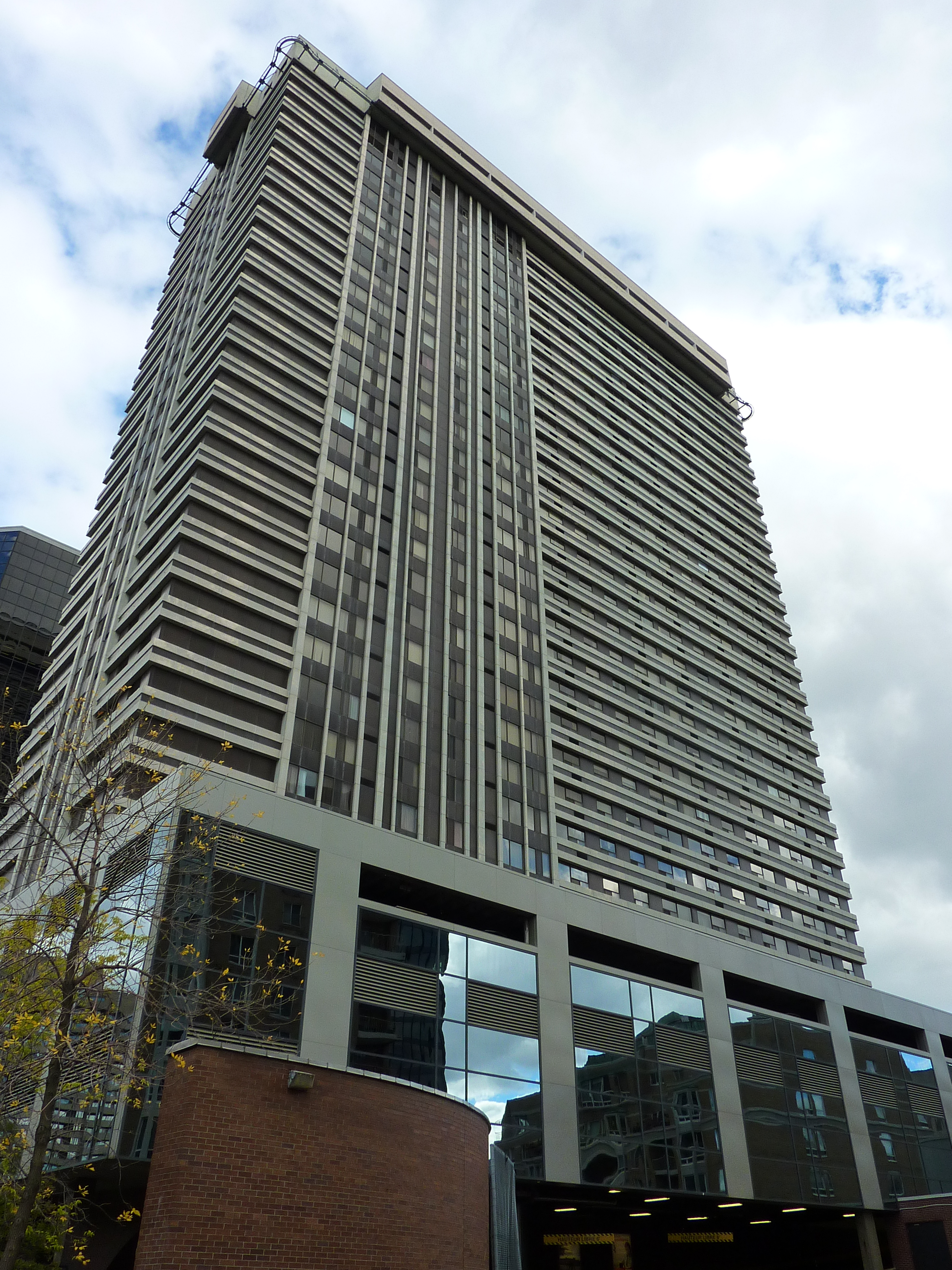
The residential tower.

Alexis Nihon, at the corner of Atwater Avenue and Ste-Catherine Street West, is accessible:

- By Metro: Green line, Atwater Station. This station directly connects to Alexis Nihon Plaza.
- By Bus: Bus lines 24, 63, 90, 104, 138, 144, 356 and 360.
- By Car: A-720/Ville-Marie Expressway, Exit 2 - Atwater Avenue.
- By Bicycle: Bicycle stations levels P1 and P3 of the parking.
- By BIXI: BIXI Station De Maisonneuve Boulevard West at the corner of Atwater.
- By Taxi: Waiting area Atwater Avenue at the corner of de Maisonneuve Boulevard West.

== Stores ==
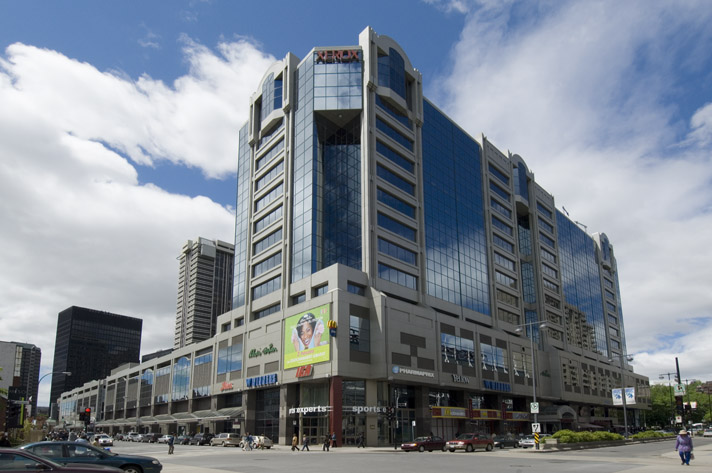
Exterior of Alexis Nihon Plaza.

The complex is directly connected to the Atwater Metro station and offers numerous services, a variety of shops and superstores, and a food court with over 25 restaurants. From 1982 until 1986, it housed Montreal's first IKEA Store, which due to a lack of space, moved out to a new location. Alexis Nihon also previously housed Miracle Mart (later becoming an M-Store), a three-screen cinema operated by Cineplex Odeon, Zellers and Steinberg's supermarket. When the complex first opened in 1967 the French department store Au Printemps opened it first location outside France.

== Food court renovations ==
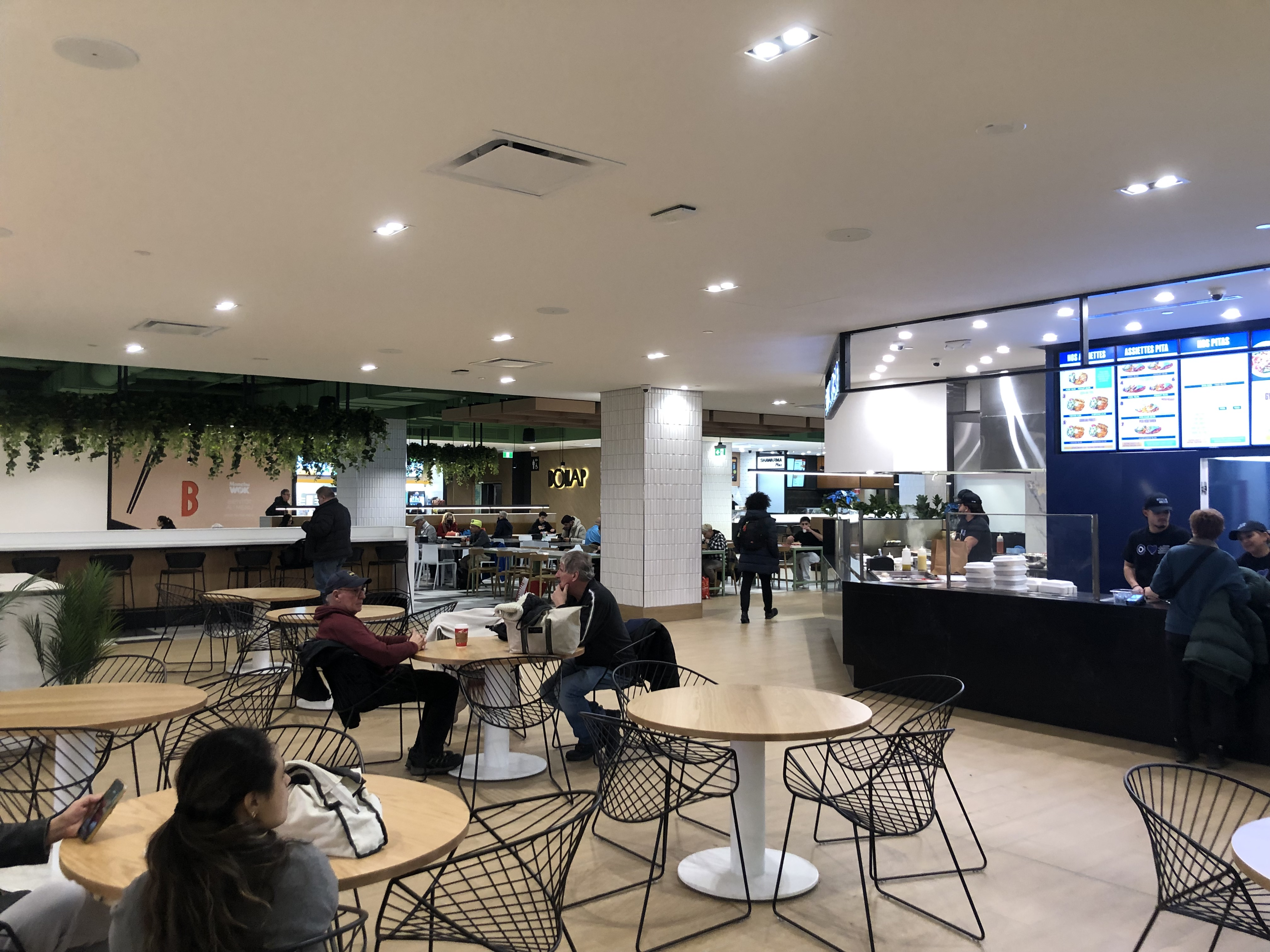
The new food court, also known as Bonap.

In early 2025, the food court went to renovation, to add new restaurants. The construction work officially begun since March 1, 2025. This led to the closure of the restaurants on it, during the entire work. It reopened in November 2025.

== See also ==
- Alexis Nihon
- Centre Laval
- List of shopping malls in Montreal
