= Westmount Park United Church =

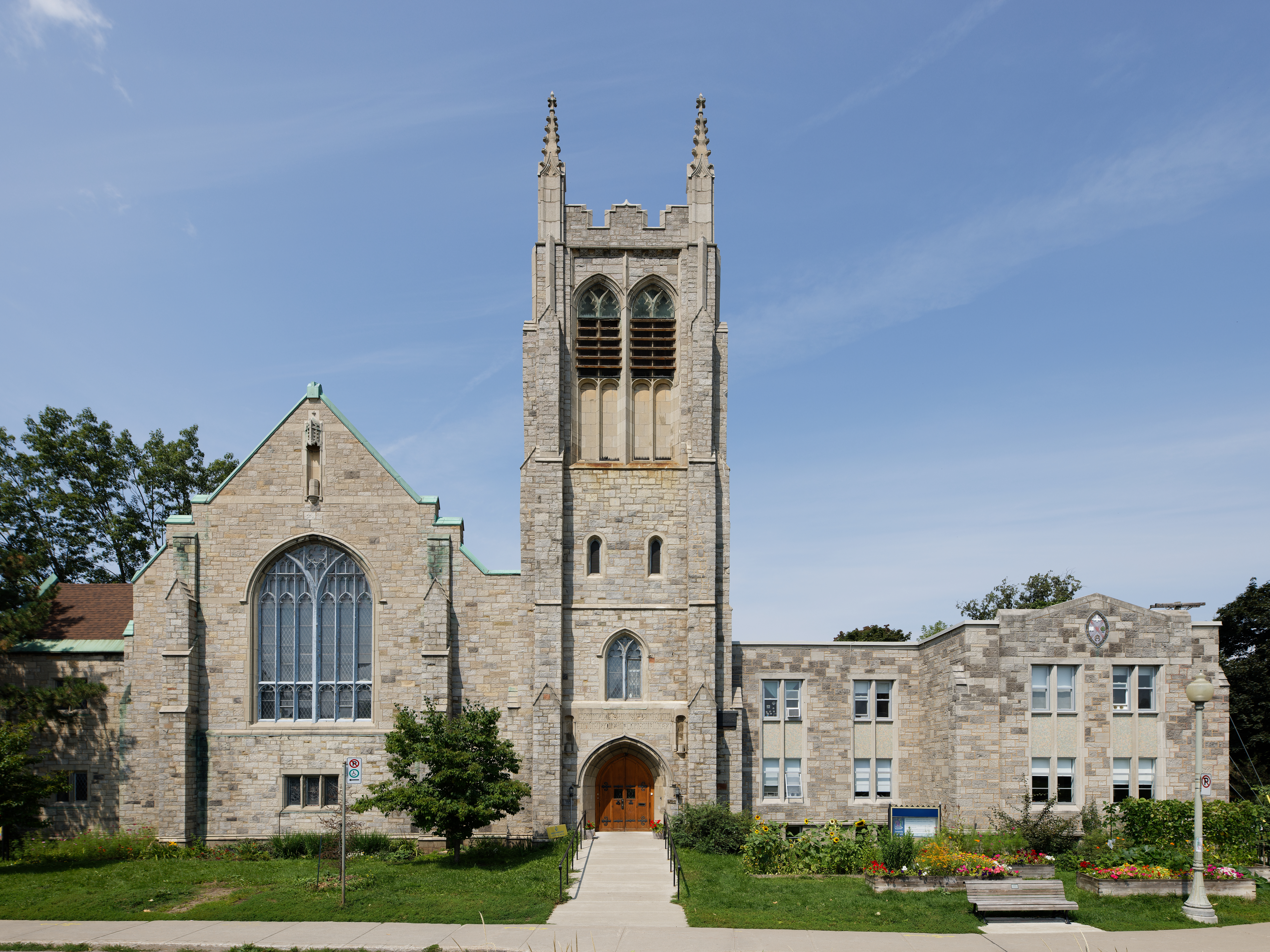
- Westmount Park United Church, 2023
- Westmount Park United Church
- 45.4798°N 73.5982°W
- Location: Westmount, Quebec
- Country: Canada
- Denomination: United Church of Canada
- Website: https://westmountparkuc.org/

History
- Status: active
- Founded: 1885

Westmount Park United Church is an historic church building in Westmount, Quebec. Located adjacent to Westmount Park on De Maisonneuve Boulevard West, the modern church is a member of the United Church of Canada. Membership is derived from four different historic Protestant congregations. The first tabernacle on the site was a Methodist wooden structure built in 1885 and replaced with brick in 1896. The current building was dedicated on April 30, 1930.

The church under Rev. Neil Whitehouse has been noted for its commitment to the environment.
