= Greene Avenue (Montreal) =

Thoroughfare in Montreal, Canada

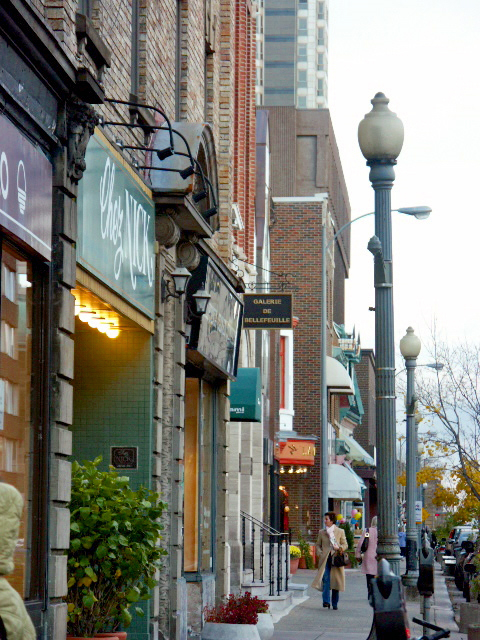
- Shops along Greene Avenue, between De Maisonneuve Boulevard and Sherbrooke Street
- Interactive map of Greene Avenue
- Native name: avenue Greene (French)
- Owner: Cities of Montreal and Westmount
- Location: Montreal and Westmount
- Coordinates: 45.487439°N 73.590745°W
- South end: Saint-Ambroise Street West, Saint-Henri
- North end: Sherbrooke Street West, Westmount (continues as Mount Pleasant Avenue)

Construction
- Inauguration: 1881

Greene Avenue (officially in French: avenue Greene) is a north-south street in Westmount and Montreal, Quebec, Canada. It links Sherbrooke Street West in the north and Saint-Ambroise Street West, near the Atwater Market and Lachine Canal in the south. North of Sherbrooke, it is known as Mount Pleasant Avenue.

Greene Avenue is locally known for its upscale shops, restaurants and antique dealers. Notable structures and businesses on the street include the western entrance to Westmount Square and the studios for radio station CKGM.

Greene Avenue was said to be given its name in 1884, after the area's former landowner, Edward K. Greene, although other sources point to G.A. Greene as the namesake.
