= Hurtubise House =

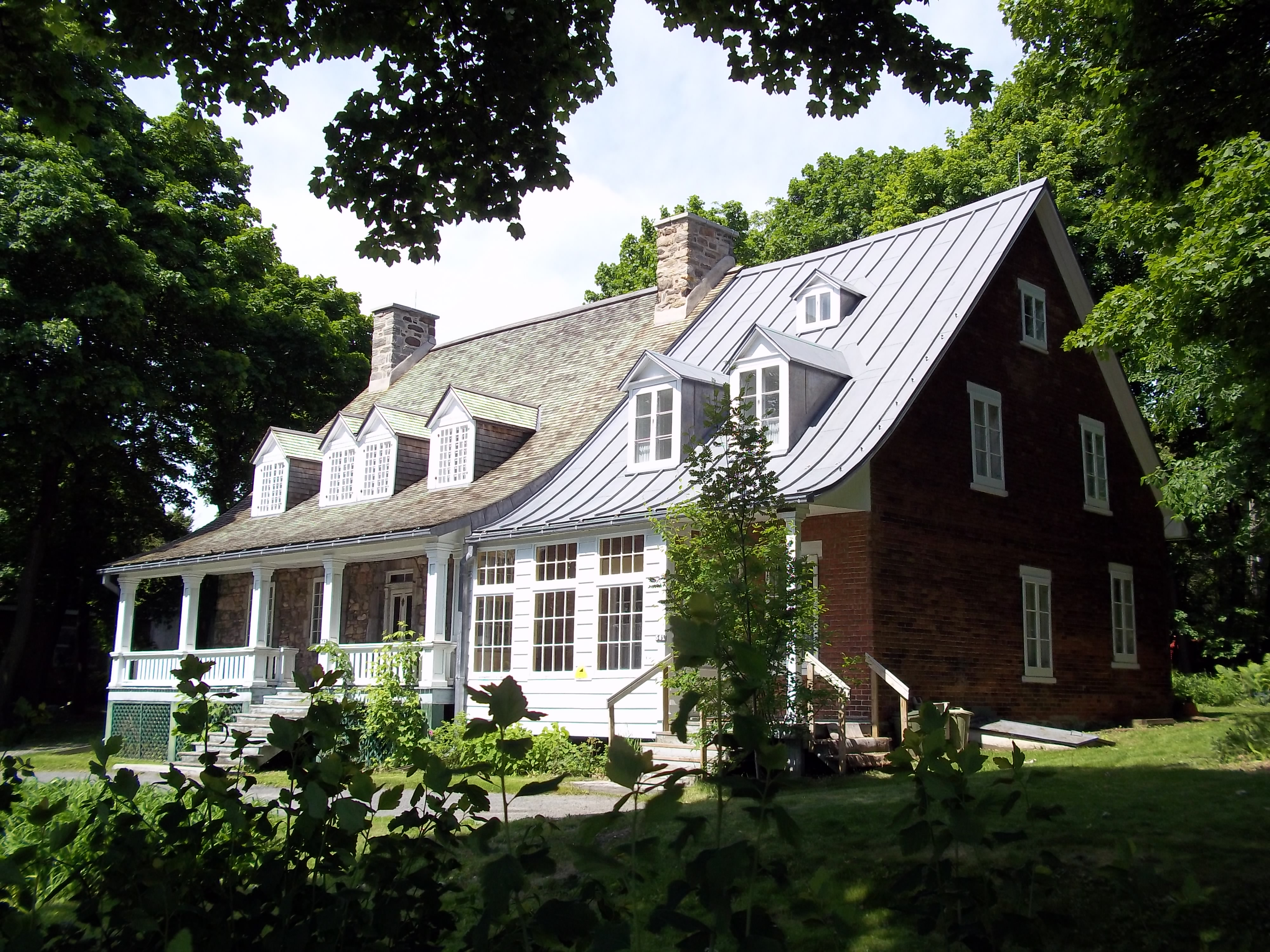
- Interactive map of the Hurtubise House area

General information
- Type: Gable-roof farmhouse
- Architectural style: Rural French-style
- Location: 561 Côte-Saint-Antoine Road, Westmount, Quebec, Canada
- Coordinates: 45.480838°N 73.608443°W
- Completed: 1739
- Renovated: December 16, 2004
- Owner: Canadian Heritage of Quebec

Height
- Roof: Gable

Technical details
- Material: Stone
- Floor count: 3
- Lifts/elevators: 1

Design and construction
- Designations: Heritage site designated by the Ministère de la Culture et des Communications

Hurtubise House was built in 1739 and is the oldest house in the city of Westmount, Quebec, Canada, a suburb of Montreal. It is located at 561 Côte-Saint-Antoine Road on the corner of Victoria Avenue.

== History ==
The land was purchased in 1699 by Jean Hurtubise, the son of Louis Hurtubise. Members of the Hurtubise family had lived there for 6 generations.

Originally, the land around the house was farm fields. The Hurtubise family worked the land, which included an orchard and market garden.

The property was divided in half in 1839, and numerous other times between 1847 and 1873.

The Hurtubise family gave up farming in 1880 and the agricultural lands of Côte-Ste-Antoine became a residential area.

The last occupant was Leopold Hurtubise, a doctor who died in 1955. Heirs of the doctor sold the house to three individuals: Mable Molson, Colin J.G. Molson, and James R. Beattie, their friend. This group established the Canadian Heritage of Quebec. In 1961, they transferred the ownership of the property to that organization.

Leopold Hurtubise initially wished to sell the property to a local developer who wanted to demolish the house and use the land to build modern homes. Alice Lighthall persuaded him to delay signing the documents. She was a heritage activist and one of the founders of the Westmount Historical Association. In 1944, in response to the slated demolition of the house, Lighthall contacted newspapers and organized a protest meeting at Victoria Hall. Her efforts resulted in Mable Molson, Colin Molson, and James R. Beattie being able to buy the property. In 1956, Hurtubise House was saved from demolition by the Canadian Heritage of Quebec. It is now protected indefinitely.

On December 16, 2004, the Ministère de la Culture et des Communications classified the house and land as a heritage site and subsequently restored it. The first phase took place in 2005 and involved the restoration of the first floor, roof, and chimney. The second phase was carried out in 2012 where the second floor, front gallery and stone wall on west side were restored. Financing for the restoration project came mostly from the Canadian Heritage of Quebec, Ministère de la Culture et des Communications, and the City of Montreal.

Hurtubise House is open for visitation by appointment.

== The house ==
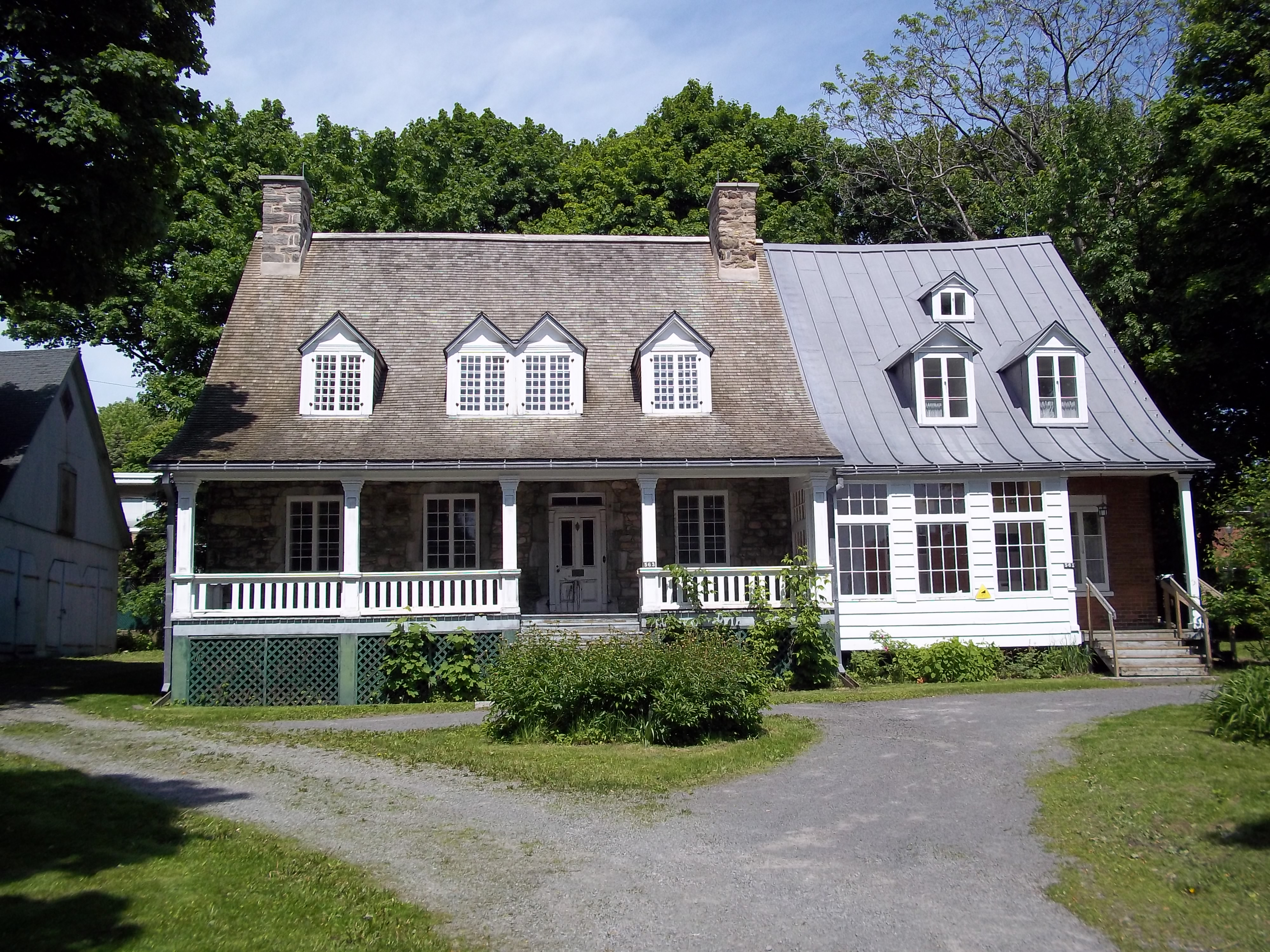
Hurtubise House in 2011

The house was called "La haute folie" by those who lived in Ville Marie. This was because it was so distant from the safety of the town at the St. Lawrence River.

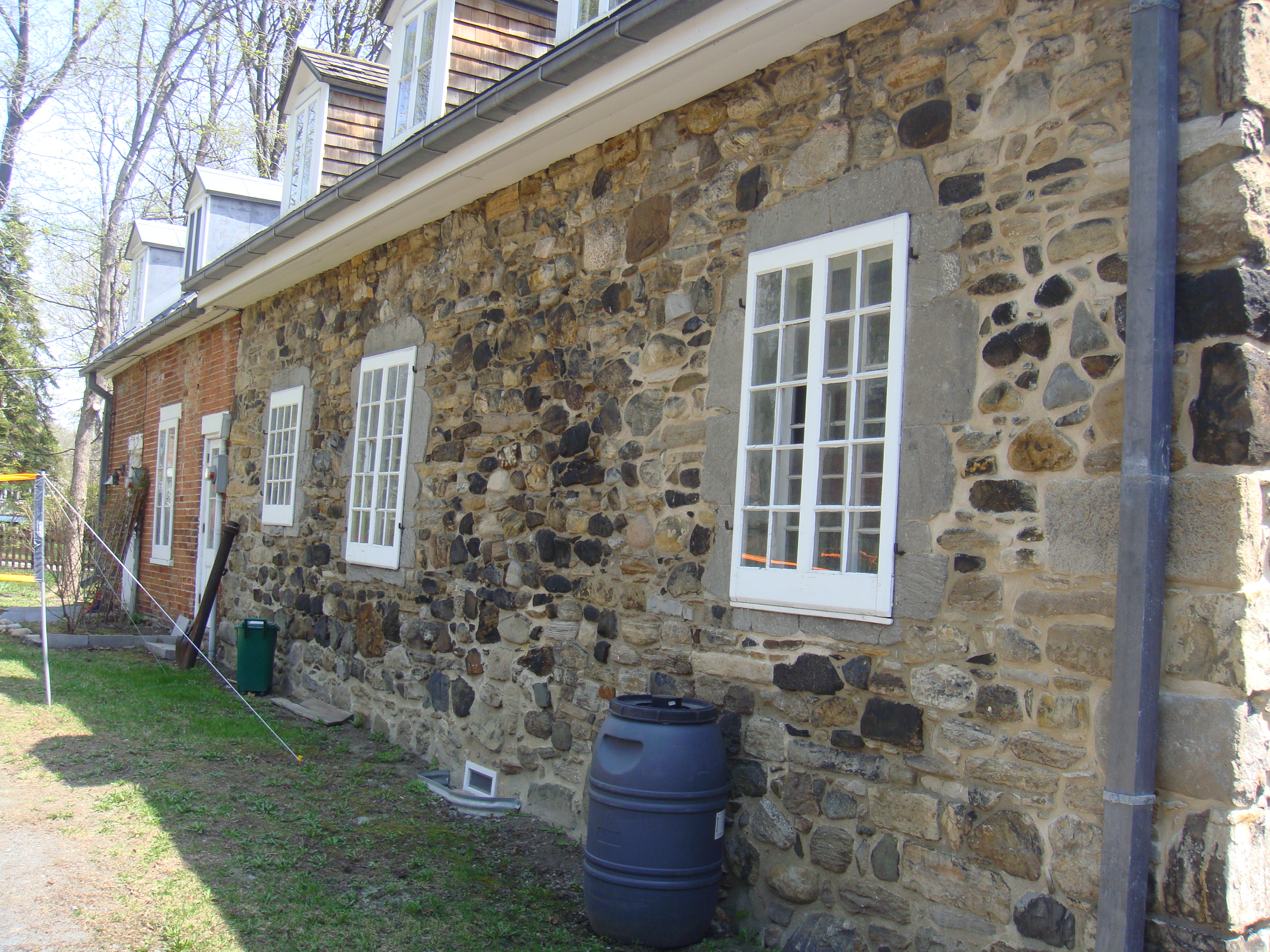
Rear

It is a 3-storey, gable-roof house built in rural French-style. For an urban home, it is larger than average for the period. There are stone walls that are 60 cm (2 ft) thick. Around the windows are flat stones. This suggests a wealthy family as it was rare at the time. There are S-shaped holders and hinges designed to hold the shutters open. There is a flat stone that served as a kitchen sink. Wallpaper is from 1885. The first floor is supported by 3 trees, one of which still has bark. The attic is constructed with wooden posts and beams. There are ventilation holes in the basement walls to allow the storage of vegetables during the winter and prevent them from rotting. These holes were once thought to be gun holes to defend against "marauding natives".

In the 1870s, an annex constructed of brick was added.
