= Atwater station =

Montreal Metro station

Atwater
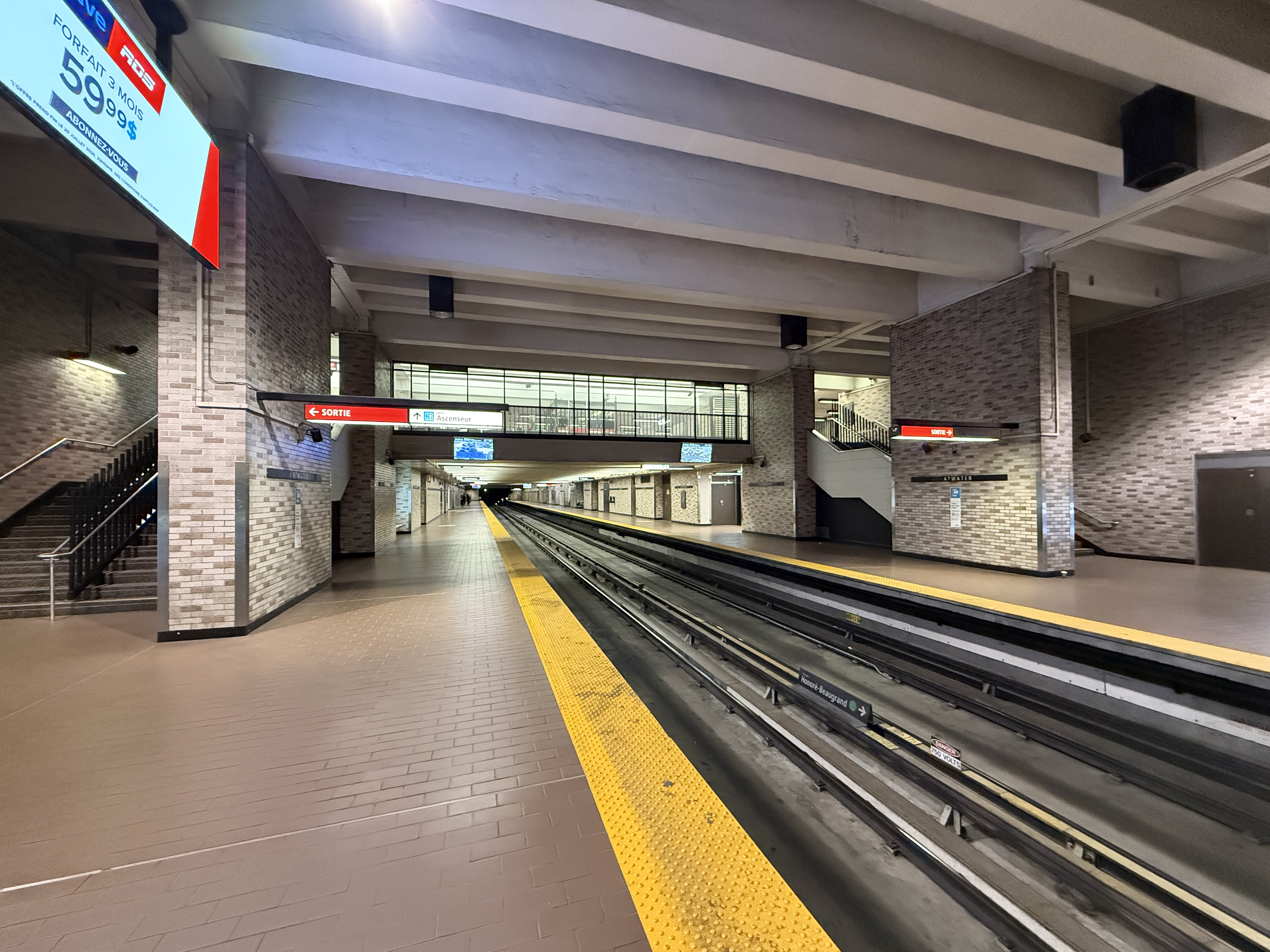

General information
- Location: 2322, rue Ste-Catherine Ouest, Montreal, and 3015, boulevard de Maisonneuve Ouest; Montreal, Quebec H3Z 3G4; Canada
- Coordinates: 45°29′23″N 73°35′10″W
- Operator: Société de transport de Montréal
- Platforms: 2 side platforms
- Tracks: 2
- Connections: STM bus

Construction
- Depth: 7.6 metres (24 feet 11 inches), 56th deepest
- Accessible: Yes
- Architect: David, Boulva et Cleve

Other information
- Fare zone: ARTM: A

History
- Opened: 14 October 1966

Passengers
- 2024: 6,175,400 ▲4.94%
- Rank: 7 of 68

Services
Preceding station	Montreal Metro	Following station
Lionel-Groulx toward Angrignon	Green Line	Guy–Concordia toward Honoré-Beaugrand
Location

Atwater station is a Montreal Metro station in the borough of Ville-Marie in Montreal, Quebec, Canada. It is operated by the Société de transport de Montréal (STM) and serves the Green Line on the border between the city of Westmount and Montreal.

The station opened on October 14, 1966, as part of the original network of the Metro; it was the western terminus of the Green Line until the extension to Angrignon in 1978.

== Architecture and art ==
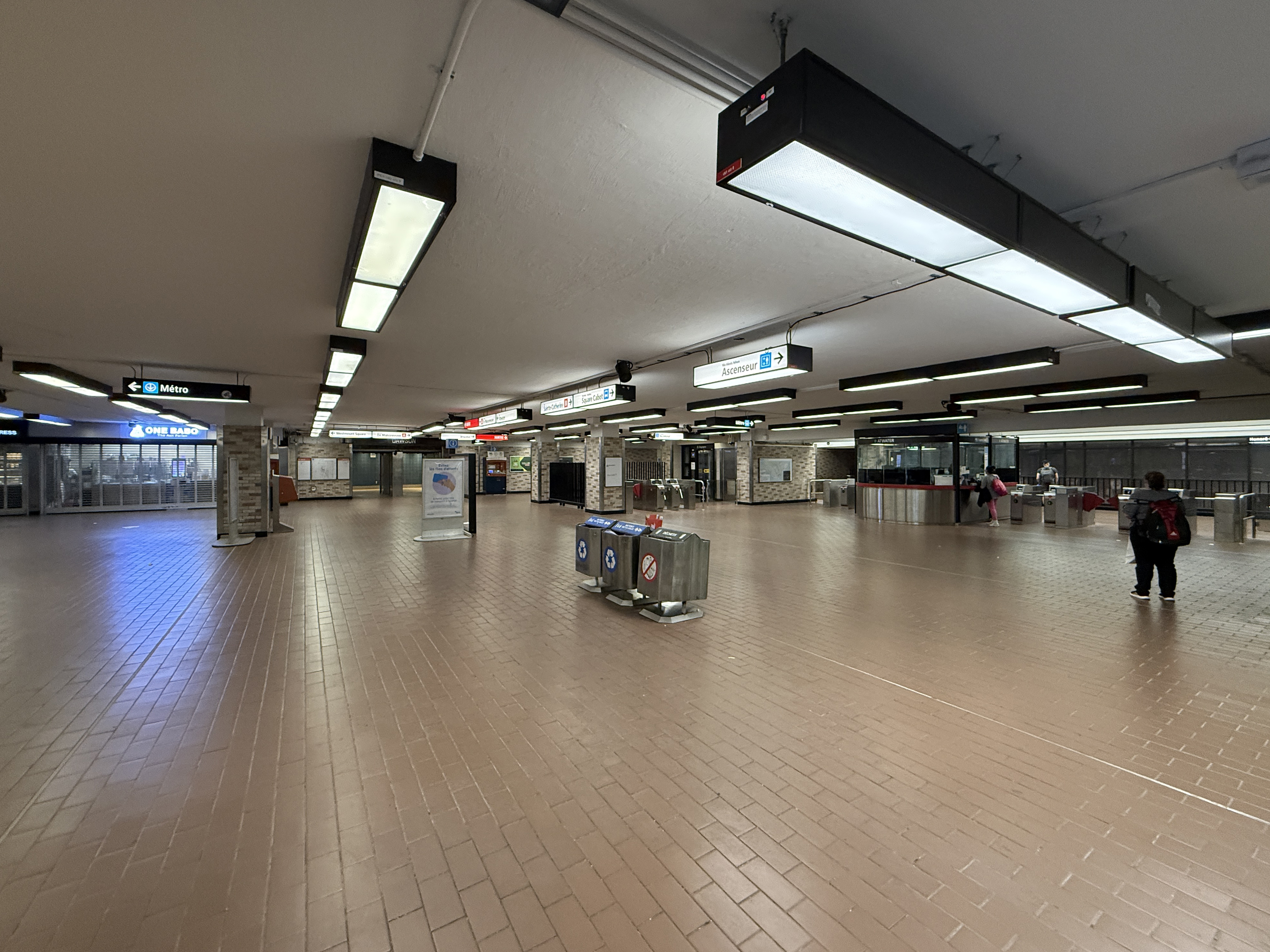
Concourse

Designed by David, Boulva et Cleve, it is a normal side platform station, built in open cut under the De Maisonneuve Boulevard. It has a large mezzanine with ticket barriers on either end. It has underground city connections to Place Alexis Nihon, Westmount Square, and Dawson College.

In August 2016, the Dawson exit was closed for refurbishment. In January 2017, the Cabot Square entrance was closed for major renovations and also to make the building unwelcoming to drug use and violent gangs on the premises.

As of 2020, work is underway to make the station universally accessible. Phase 2 of this project has begun in 2024. On April 14, 2025, work is officially complete and Atwater became the 30th accessible station in the network.

The station is equipped with MétroVision information screens which display news, commercials, and the time until the next train.

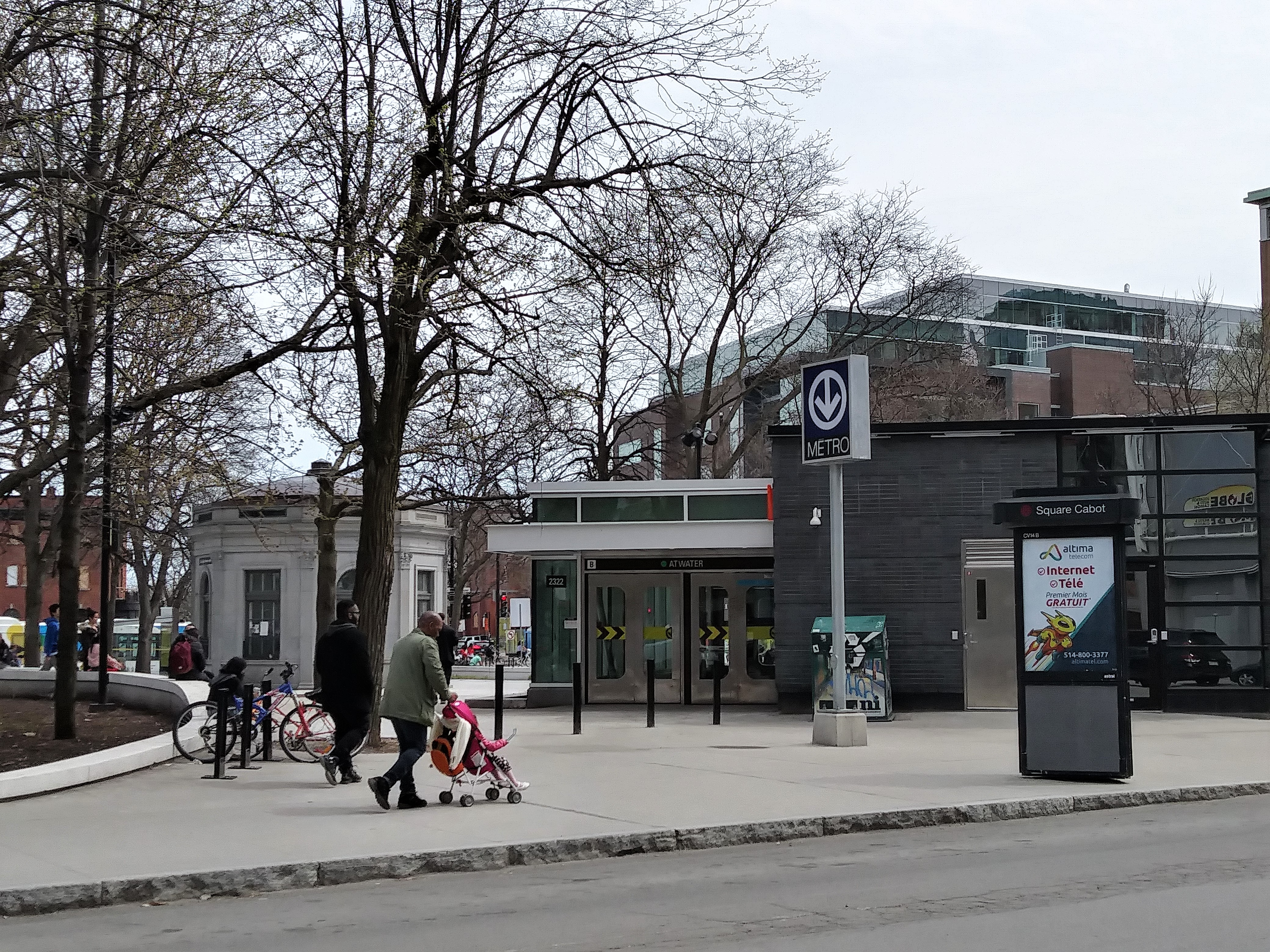
Station entrance on the southeasterly corner of Atwater Avenue and Saint Catherine Street

== Origin of the name ==
This station is named after Atwater Avenue, which itself was named in honor of Edwin Atwater (1808–1874). Edwin Atwater was a municipal alderman of the Saint-Antoine district. The street was officially named after him in 1871.

== Connecting bus routes ==
Société de transport de Montréal
No.	Route	Connects to	Service times / notes
57	Charlevoix	Charlevoix; Georges-Vanier	Daily
63	Girouard		Monday to Saturday only
90	Saint-Jacques	Vendôme; Du Canal	Daily
104	Cavendish	Vendôme	Daily
108	Bannantyne	LaSalle; Lionel-Groulx	Daily
138	Notre-Dame-de-Grâce		Daily
144	Des Pins	Sherbrooke	Daily
150	René-Lévesque	Bonaventure; Gare Centrale; Terminus Centre-ville; Lucien-L'Allier; Papineau	Daily
350 ☾	Verdun / LaSalle	Frontenac; Bonaventure; Gare Centrale; Terminus Centre-ville; Lucien-L'Allier; Lionel-Groulx; LaSalle; De L'Église; Verdun; Jolicoeur; Monk	Night service
354 ☾	Sainte-Anne-de-Bellevue / Centre-ville	Dorval; Pointe-Claire; Beaconsfield; Beaurepaire; Baie d'Urfé; Sainte-Anne-de-Bellevue	Night service
355 ☾	Pie-IX	Saint-Michel-Montréal-Nord; Pie-IX; Frontenac; Bonaventure; Gare Centrale; Terminus Centre-ville; Lucien-L'Allier	Night service
356 ☾	Lachine / YUL Aéroport / Des Sources	Frontenac; Montréal-Ouest; Du Canal; Dorval; Des Sources; Sunnybrooke; Pierrefonds-Roxboro	Night service Connects to Montréal-Trudeau International Airport
358 ☾	René-Lévesque	Frontenac; Papineau; Bonaventure; Gare Centrale; Terminus Centre-ville; Lucien-L'Allier	Night service
360 ☾	Des Pins	Frontenac; Sherbrooke	Night service
364 ☾	Sherbrooke / Joseph-Renaud	Honoré-Beaugrand; Radisson; Langelier; Cadillac; Frontenac; Bonaventure; Gare Centrale; Terminus Centre-ville; Lucien-L'Allier	Night service
369 ☾	Côte-des-Neiges	Namur; Côte-des-Neiges; Guy-Concordia	Night service
371 ☾	Décarie	Côte-Vertu; Du Collège; De La Savane; Namur; Snowdon; Place-Saint-Henri; Lionel-Groulx	Night service
376 ☾	Pierrefonds / Centre-ville	Namur	Night service

== Entrances ==
3015 Boulevard De Maisonneuve

2322 Rue Ste Catherine Ouest (via the Alexis Nihon Complex)

2330 Rue Ste Catherine Ouest (via Cabot Square)

== Nearby points of interests ==
=== Connected via the underground city ===
- Alexis Nihon Complex
- Westmount Square
- Dawson College

=== Other ===
- Atwater Library
- Montreal Forum
- Cabot Square
- Westmount City Hall
- Temple Emanu-El Beth Sholom
- Église Saint-Léon-de-Westmount
- Batshaw Youth & Family Centres
