= Westmount Summit =

Summit of Mount Royal in Quebec, Canada

Westmount Summit Sommet de Westmount
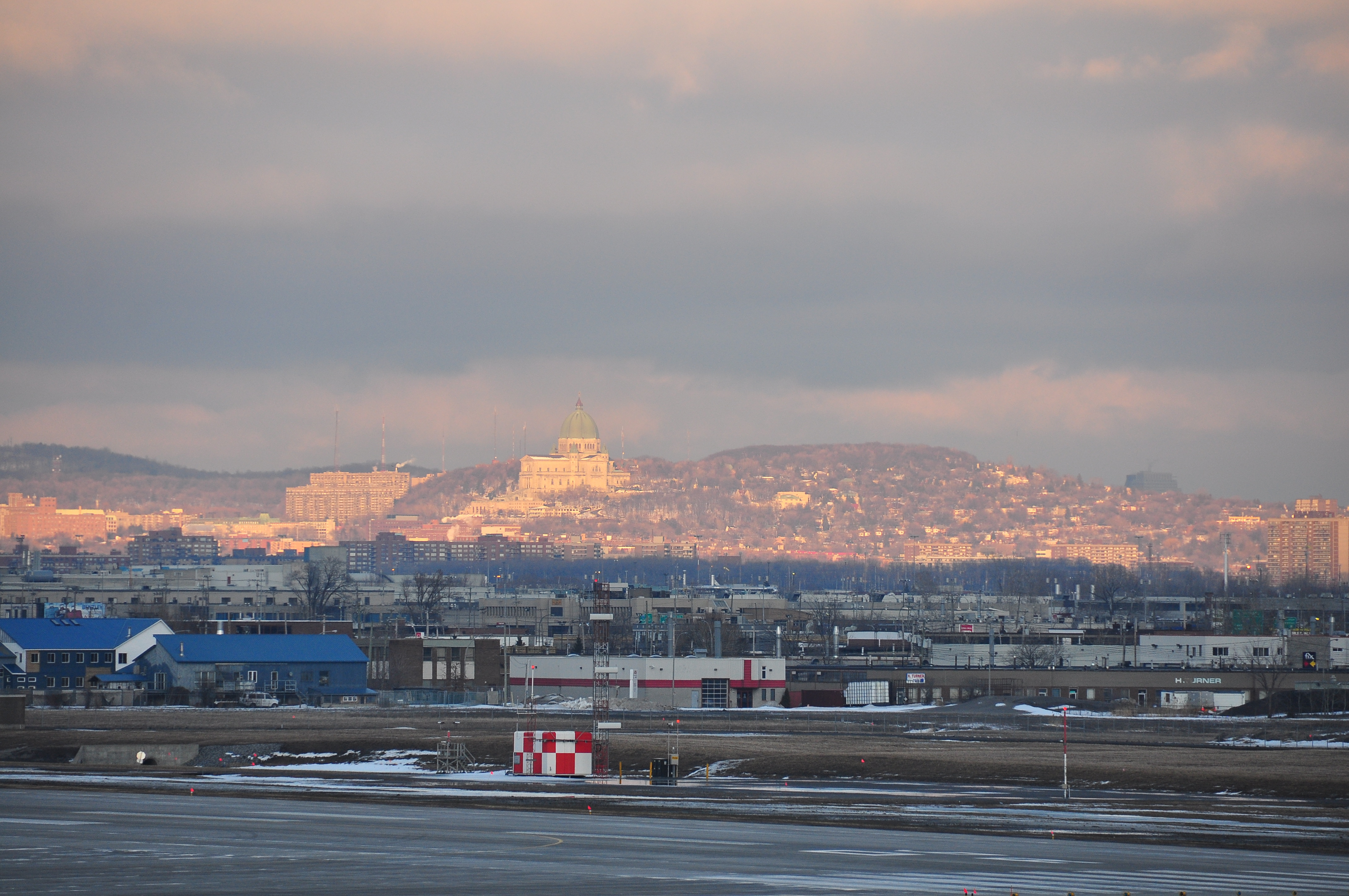
- Outremont (left), Saint Joseph's Oratory and Westmount

Highest point
- Elevation: 201 m (659 ft)
- Coordinates: 45°29′31.03″N 73°36′25″W

Geography
- Location within Quebec
- Location: Westmount, Quebec, Canada
- Parent range: Monteregian Hills
- Topo map: USGS Mount Katahdin

Geology
- Rock age: Early Cretaceous
- Mountain type: Intrusive stock

Climbing
- Easiest route: Hiking or cycling

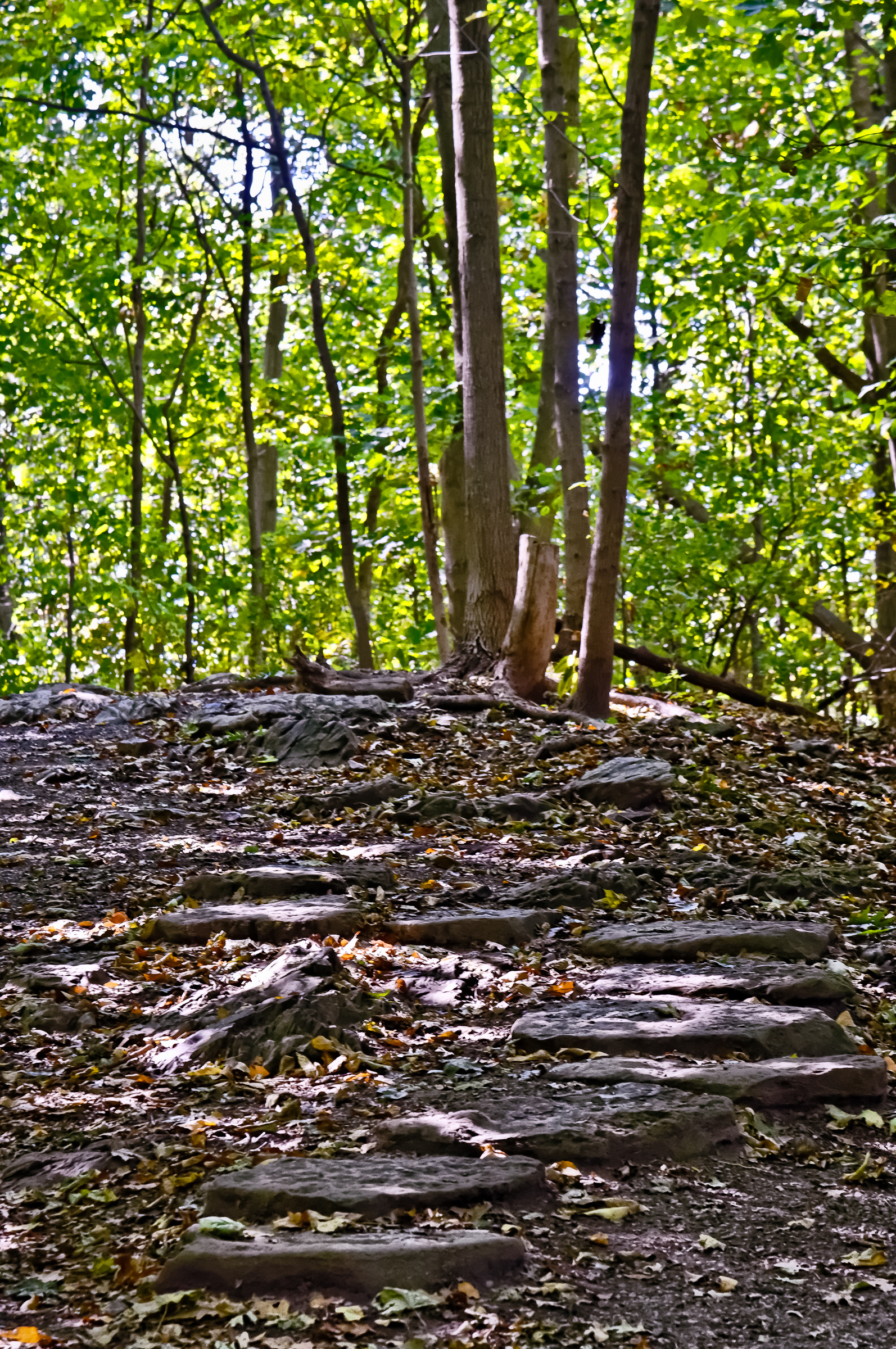
A trail in the summit woods.

Westmount Summit Le sommet de Westmount
- Location within Montreal
- Location: Westmount, Quebec, Canada
- Coordinates: 45°29′31″N 73°36′25″W
- Area: 23.087 hectares (57.05 acres)
- Operator: City of Westmount

Westmount Summit (French: Sommet de Westmount) is one of the three peaks of Mount Royal (along with Mount Royal proper and Outremont) located in the City of Westmount, Quebec, Canada. Part of the geographical summit is located adjacent to the Montreal borough of Côte-des-Neiges–Notre-Dame-de-Grâce.

The highest point is approximately 201 metres (659 ft) above sea-level, surrounded by a larger plateau of relatively level terrain before giving way to steeper slopes on all sides.

A lookout is located on its southern face, providing views over Westmount, Montreal, the south shore and the Eastern Townships. Saint Joseph's Oratory is on the northern side, on Queen Mary Road in Côte-des-Neiges.

== Summit Woods ==
In 1895, McGill University purchased several tracts of land covering Westmount Summit, using funds donated by William Christopher Macdonald. These properties were acquired for the construction of an observatory and access roads, to be used by McGill's Survey School. Many of the purchased lots were subject to a perpetual servitude restricting building heights, so as not to block views from the planned observatory.

In the late 19th century, interest in astronomical observatories was growing due to the importance of celestial references for standardized timekeeping, which was in turn crucial for emerging railway networks and shipping. Use of the observatory was short-lived however, due to increasing light and air pollution from the growing City of Montreal. In 1940 McGill sold the land that is now Summit Woods to the City of Westmount for CAD$300,000, under the condition that the property be used "as a park or playground in perpetuity."

The forested area of the park is bordered on three sides by Summit Circle, a picturesque residential portion of Westmount. Some of the nearby homes are still subject to the height restriction servitudes introduced in 1895 for the McGill observatory. The Northern section, featuring more rugged terrain, extends to the boundary with the Montreal neighbourhood of Côte-des-Neiges. At approximately 23.087 hectares (57.05 acres) Summit Woods is the largest park in Westmount.

The Woods are home to many species of animals including approximately twenty species of mammals, 150 species of birds, and thousands of insect species as well as snakes and other reptiles. There are also many species of wild plants, fungi, and flowers located in the forested areas.

In 2005, Summit Woods was included as part of the Mount Royal Heritage Zone created by the Quebec Government, along with other portions of Mount Royal in Montreal and Outremont. The current name of Summit Woods was assigned by Westmount in 2010, replacing the original name of Summit Park, in order to better reflect its status as an urban forest.

Summit Woods is now a popular spot for bird watchers and dog walkers, although the massive foundation blocks once used for telescopes remain prominently visible in their original locations.

== Dog run ==
Summit Woods is recognized by the City of Westmount as a public dog run facility, a use which has been authorized at certain times of the year since the 1940s. Since 1995, seasonal leashing rules have been in place to harmonize with the park's modern re-branding as an urban forest and bird and wild flower sanctuary.

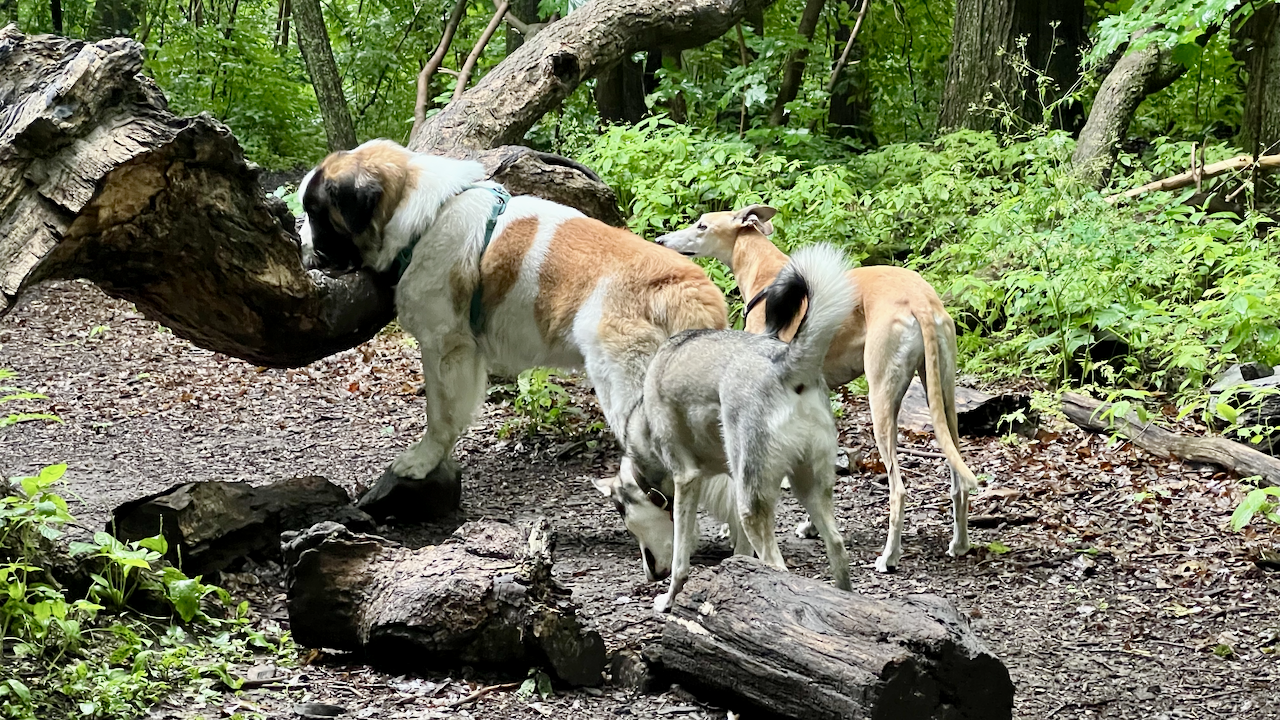
Dog drinking water from a tree hollow in Summit Woods while two others wait in line.

The Summit Woods park is one of three dog run facilities located within the Mount Royal Heritage Zone, the others being located in Jeanne-Mance Park and Sir Percy Walters Park.

Owners wishing to bring their dogs to Summit Woods must first obtain a license from the City of Westmount and familiarize themselves with the seasonal leashing rules.

== Bird sanctuaries ==
Westmount Summit is home to two parks historically recognized as bird sanctuaries.

The older of these is Argyle Park, located on the lower slopes of Westmount Summit. The park is a small triangular strip of land bounded by Argyle Avenue, Westmount Avenue, and the Boulevard. In 1926, the Quebec Society for the Protection of Birds presented the City with a Bird Bath to be erected in this park, which remains to the present day.

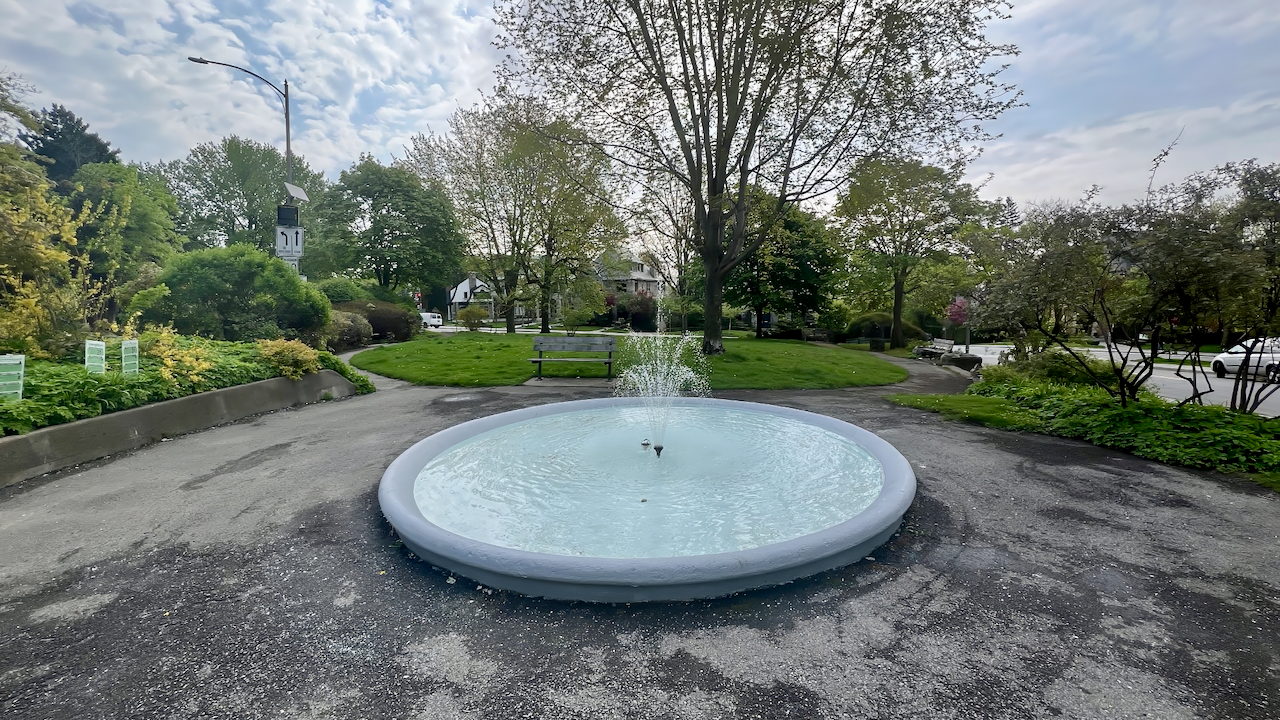
Bird bath in the Argyle Park bird sanctuary on the Southern slope of Westmount Summit.

The other is Summit Woods. From 1940 to around 1945, the Verdun and District Sportsmen's Association introduced various game birds including pheasants, quail, and grouse with the aim of increasing hunting stocks in the area. The birds were fed and watered by a gamekeeper but were gradually stolen until all were gone.

Although Summit Woods is not protected under Federal or Provincial law as a bird sanctuary, wildlife preserve, or nature preserve, it was officially designated by the City of Westmount "as a municipal park established as an urban forest and bird and wild flower sanctuary" in 1991.

== Montreal Botanical Gardens ==
In 1885 McGill University established a Chair of Botany and Vegetal Physiology, which was first held by David P. Penhallow. Penhallow and other local botanists sought to establish a botanical garden in Montreal, but struggled to secure a suitable site. From 1890 to around 1901, McGill leased 3.6 hectares (nine acres) of land on the lower slopes of Westmount Summit, along Côte-des-Neiges Road just South of what is presently the Boulevard. This site was to be the temporary home for McGill's botanical studies program, until the opening of McGill's Macdonald Campus in the early 20th century.

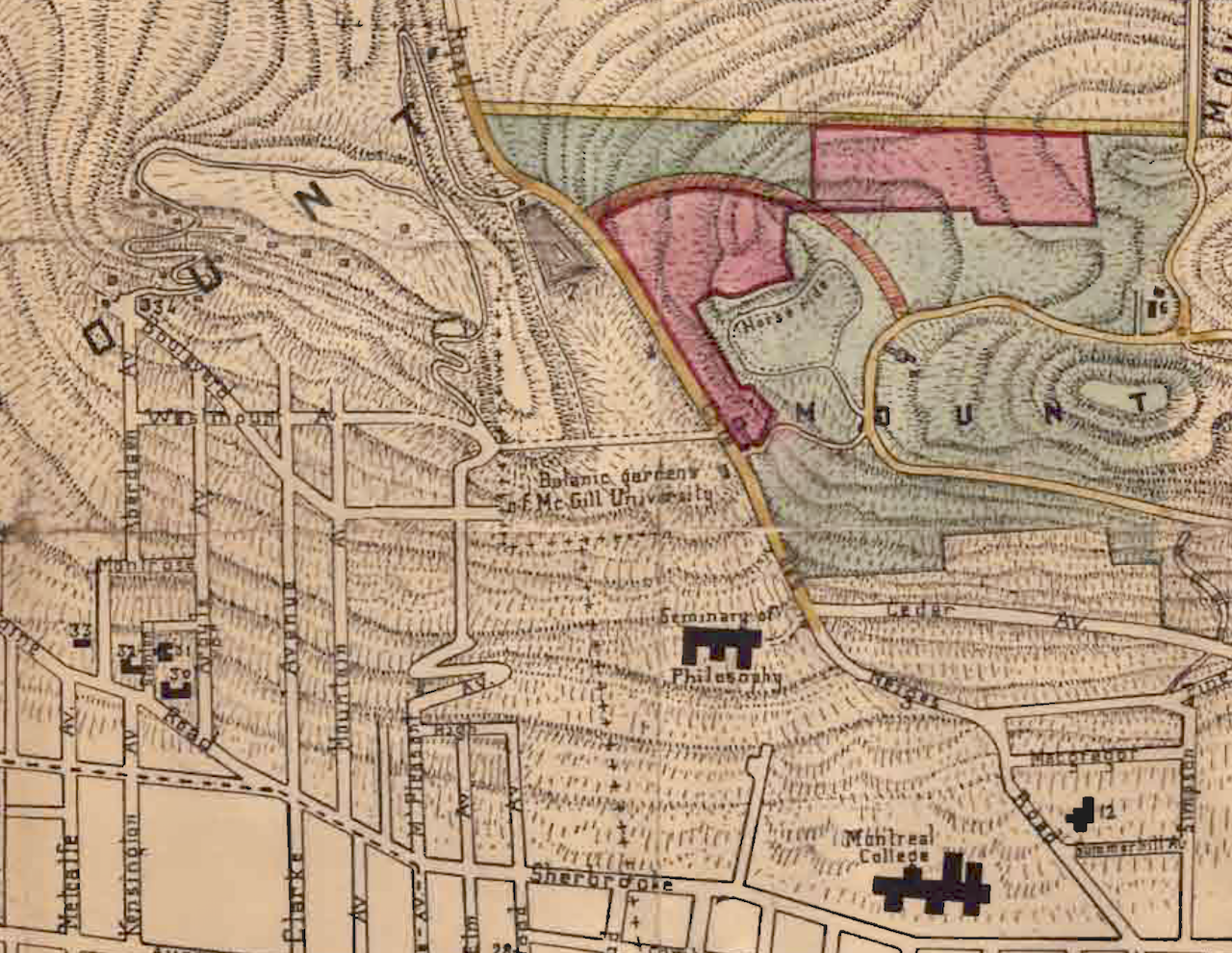
Excerpt from Topographical Map of Mount Royal by A. de Grandpré showing location of McGill's botanical gardens on Côte-des-Neiges Road circa 1898. Summit Woods is situated above the gardens, on the hilltop plateau near the letter "N" in the upper left corner of the map.

The site was known as the Montreal Botanical gardens and was open to the general public. The Gardens included greenhouses with a total area of 455 square metres (4,900 square feet), comprising "three temperate houses and one mixed stove house." The collection included "a large representation of type groups suited to purposes of instruction, and an especially valuable collection of Australasian plants chiefly derived from donations by the late Baron Von Mueller of Melbourne."

The Montreal Botanical Gardens on Côte-des-Neiges Road ceased to exist around 1901. According to McGill University's annual report, Director David P. Penhallow reported that the uncertain year-to-year lease arrangement made it unwise to invest in permanent improvements, forcing the collections to be "kept within such limits as would barely suffice to meet the ordinary requirements of class instruction." The loss of the lease resulted in what Penhallow described as "a sacrifice of nearly all this material," effectively ending eighteen years of botanical garden development at the site. In 1907 McGill opened MacDonald College in Sainte-Anne-de-Bellevue, which became the nexus for plant and agricultural sciences at McGill.

In 1931, the City of Montreal founded what is now the Montreal Botanical Garden, a site comprising 75 hectares (190 acres) of thematic gardens and greenhouses, in the East End of Montreal.
