= Westmount =

City in southwestern Quebec, Canada

- City
- City of Westmount; Ville de Westmount
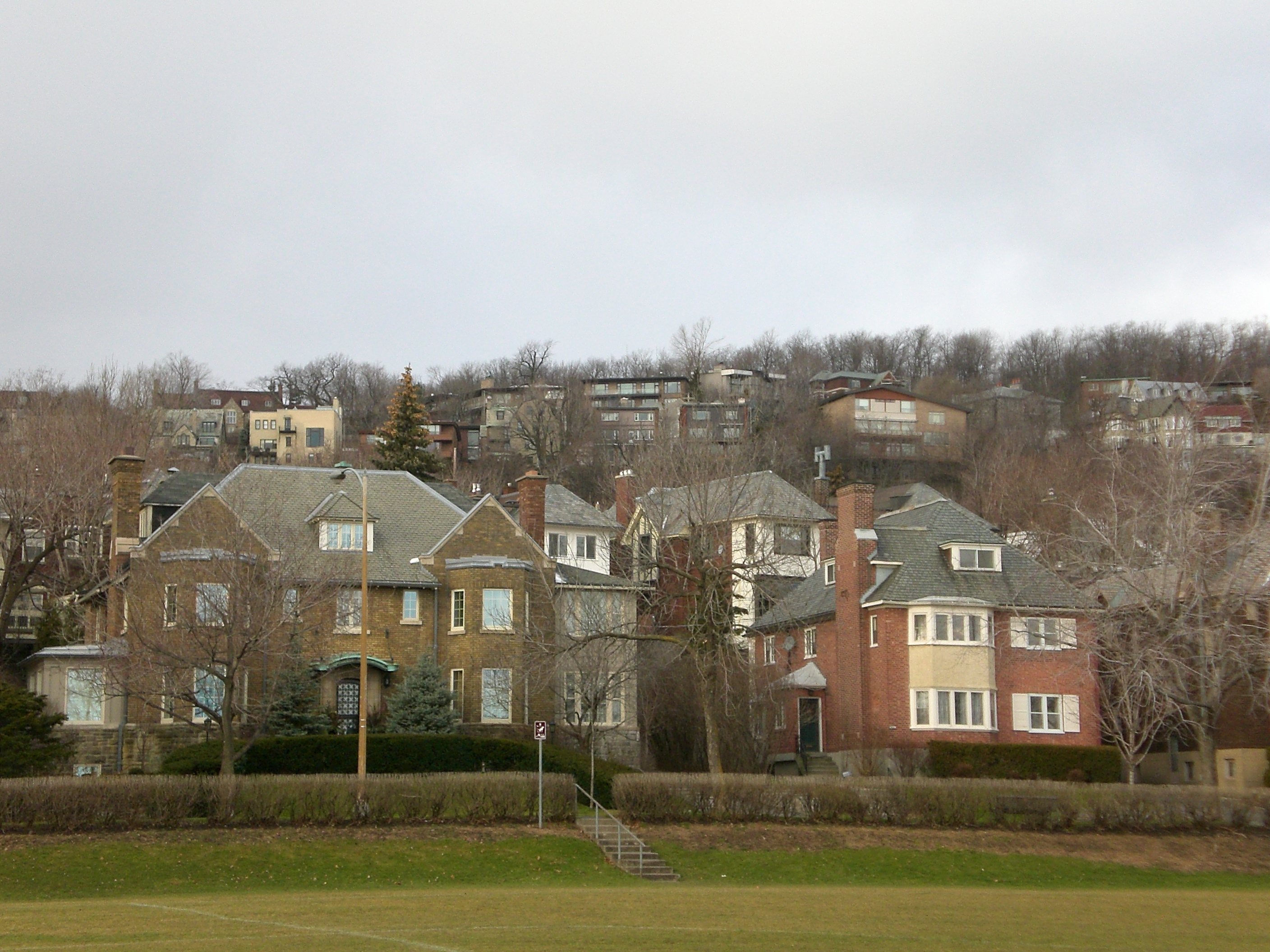
- Upper Westmount and Westmount Summit seen from King George Park.

- Coat of arms
- Motto: Robur meum civium fides (Latin for: "My strength is the faithfulness of my citizens")
- Location on the Island of Montreal

- Location in southern Quebec
- Coordinates: 45°29′N 73°36′W
- Country: Canada
- Province: Quebec
- Region: Montreal
- RCM: None
- Founded: 1874
- Constituted: January 1, 2006

Government
  - Mayor: Michael Stern
  - Federal riding: Notre-Dame-de-Grâce—Westmount
  - Prov. riding: Westmount–Saint-Louis

Area
  - Total: 4.02 km^{2} (1.55 sq mi)
  - Land: 4.04 km^{2} (1.56 sq mi)
- There is an apparent contradiction between 2 authoritative sources.

Population (2021)
  - Total: 19,658
  - Density: 4,860.9/km^{2} (12,590/sq mi)
  - Dwellings: 9,423
- Demonym: Westmounter
- Time zone: UTC−05:00 (EST)
  - Summer (DST): UTC−04:00 (EDT)
- Postal code(s): H3Y and H3Z
- Area codes: 514 and 438
- Highways: R-138
- Website: www.westmount.org/en/

Westmount (French pronunciation: [wɛstmaunt]) is a city on the Island of Montreal, in southwestern Quebec, Canada. Enclaved by the city of Montreal, it had a population of 19,658 in the 2021 Canadian census.

Westmount is home to schools, an arena, a pool, a public library and a number of parks, including Westmount Park, King George Park (also known as Murray Hill Park) and Westmount Summit. The city operates its own electricity distribution company Westmount Light & Power (Hydro-Westmount). The city is also the location of two Canadian Forces Primary Reserve units: The Royal Montreal Regiment and 34th Signals Regiment.

Traditionally, the community of Westmount has been a wealthy and predominantly anglophone enclave, having been at one point the richest community in Canada. It is still the most affluent neighbourhood in Canada outside of Toronto, Vancouver, and Calgary.

== History ==
There are indications of a First Nations presence 4000 to 5000 years ago. A large number of prehistoric burial sites were found within the area of Westmount. The Anishinaabe and Haudenosaunee (Iroquois) peoples have historically inhabited the Island of Montreal as well as much of Quebec.

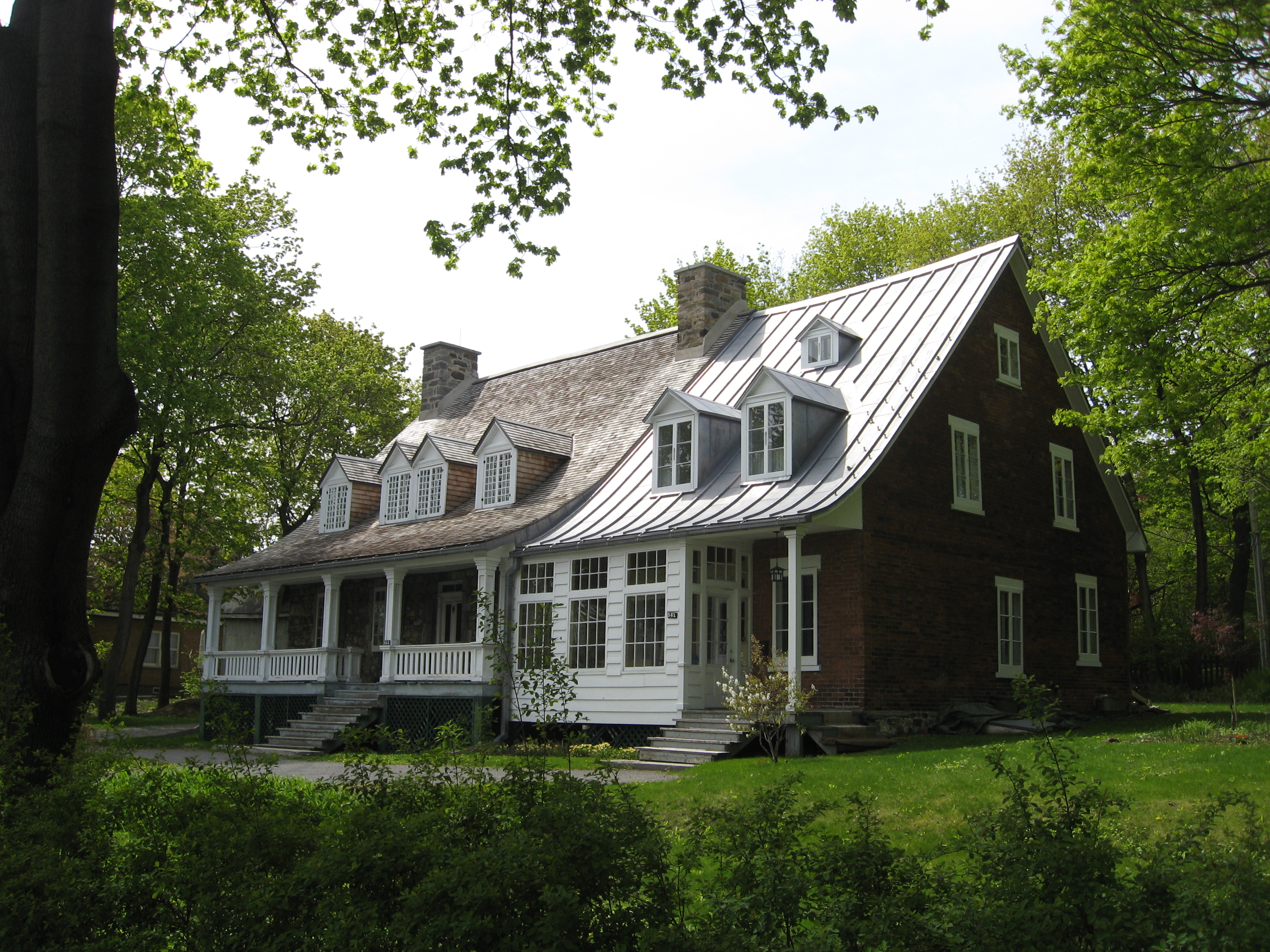
Hurtubise House

When the first French colonists settled in the area in the middle of the seventeenth century, this area was known by several names including La Petite Montagne, Notre-Dame-de-Grâce and Côte-Saint-Antoine. A former farmhouse from this era, Hurtubise House, is the oldest house still standing in Westmount.

The Village of Côte St-Antoine was first incorporated in 1874. It later became the Town of Côte St-Antoine.

It was renamed Westmount, in 1895, reflecting the geographical location of the city on the southwest slope of Mount Royal and the presence of a large English-speaking population.

During the twentieth century, Westmount became a wealthy residential area within the island of Montreal; a small city dotted with many green spaces. Architect Robert Findlay, a resident in the early twentieth century, designed many municipal buildings in the city, including the library, Westmount City Hall and several other buildings of public order.

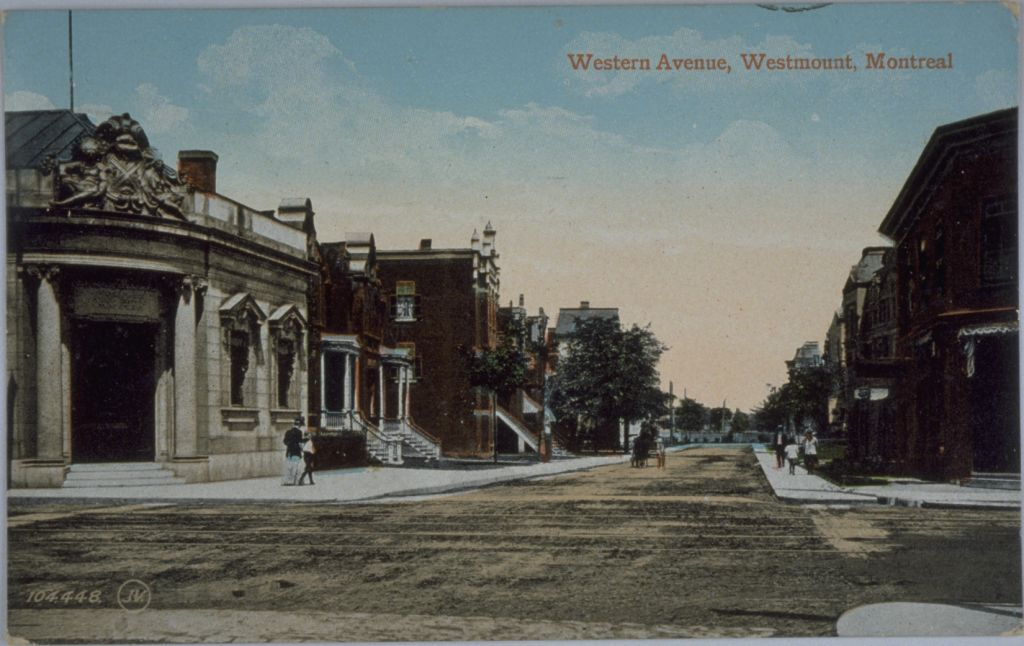
Western Avenue, Westmount (now De Maisonneuve Boulevard)

In the twentieth century, Westmount was home to some of Montreal's wealthiest families including the Bronfmans and the Molsons. This made the city a symbolic target of Front de libération du Québec terrorist bombings in the 1960s, culminating in the 1970 October Crisis.

Following the death of former Quebec Premier René Lévesque in 1987, the city of Montreal renamed Dorchester Boulevard René Lévesque Boulevard. After the city of Montreal changed the name, Westmount retained the name of Dorchester on their portion, as did Montréal-Est.

=== Merger with Montreal ===
In 2001, while trying to prevent Westmount from being amalgamated into the city of Montreal, Westmount Mayor Peter Trent and city council asserted that the city was a designated anglophone institution and should not be merged into francophone greater Montreal. In response to this opposition, Municipal Affairs Minister Louise Harel said that Westmount's resistance "reeked of colonialism" and that the opposition was an "ethnic project", statements for which she would refuse to apologize. When asked for comment, Quebec Premier Bernard Landry said the minister had his full support and that the opposition was little more than Quebec bashing. Several federalist public figures criticized Landry's statement: Jean Charest called it insulting to the intelligence of the citizens of Quebec; Joseph Gabary, president of the Quebec Chapter of the Canadian Jewish Congress, called the language "crude"; Alliance Quebec also criticized the premier for singling out the city for special criticism.

On January 1, 2002, as part of the 2002–2006 municipal reorganization of Montreal, Westmount was merged into the city of Montreal and became a borough. However, after a change of government and a 2004 referendum, it was re-constituted as an independent city on January 1, 2006. It is now one of fifteen independent cities on the Island of Montreal, and the only one that directly borders the downtown core.

Nevertheless, it remains part of the urban agglomeration of Montreal and the bulk of its municipal taxes go to the Agglomeration Council, which oversees activities common to all municipalities on the Island of Montreal (e.g. police, fire protection, public transit) even after the demerger.

== Geography ==
The city is roughly 4 km^{2} (1.5 sq mi), and occupies an area of land on the south face of Westmount Summit, the western peak of Mount Royal. The city, most of which is on steep terrain, extends from the summit to the end of the narrow plateau at the foot of the mountain.

== Cityscape ==
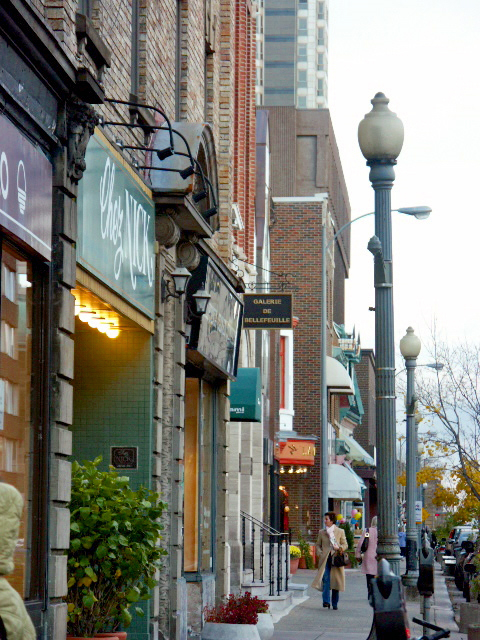
Greene Avenue in eastern Westmount.

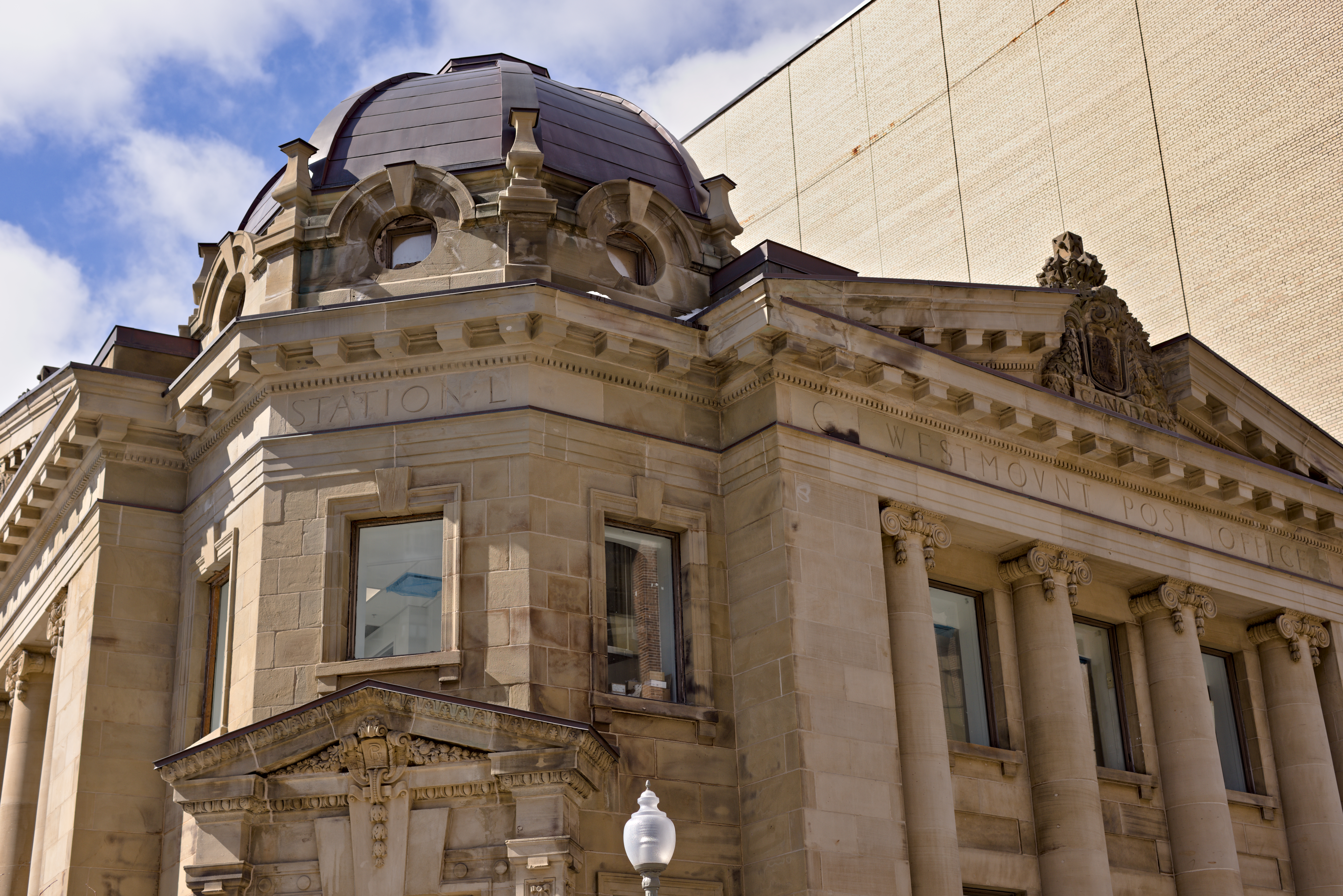
Westmount's former post office on Greene Avenue, built in 1913 and designed by Willis Ritchie.

Most of the city is residential. Homes increase in size and value toward the top of the mountain, with the largest and most expensive being on or near Summit Circle.

Notable buildings include Place Alexis Nihon and the Westmount Square complex, which was designed by Ludwig Mies van der Rohe and funded largely by Westmount resident Samuel Bronfman, the founder of the Seagram liquor empire.

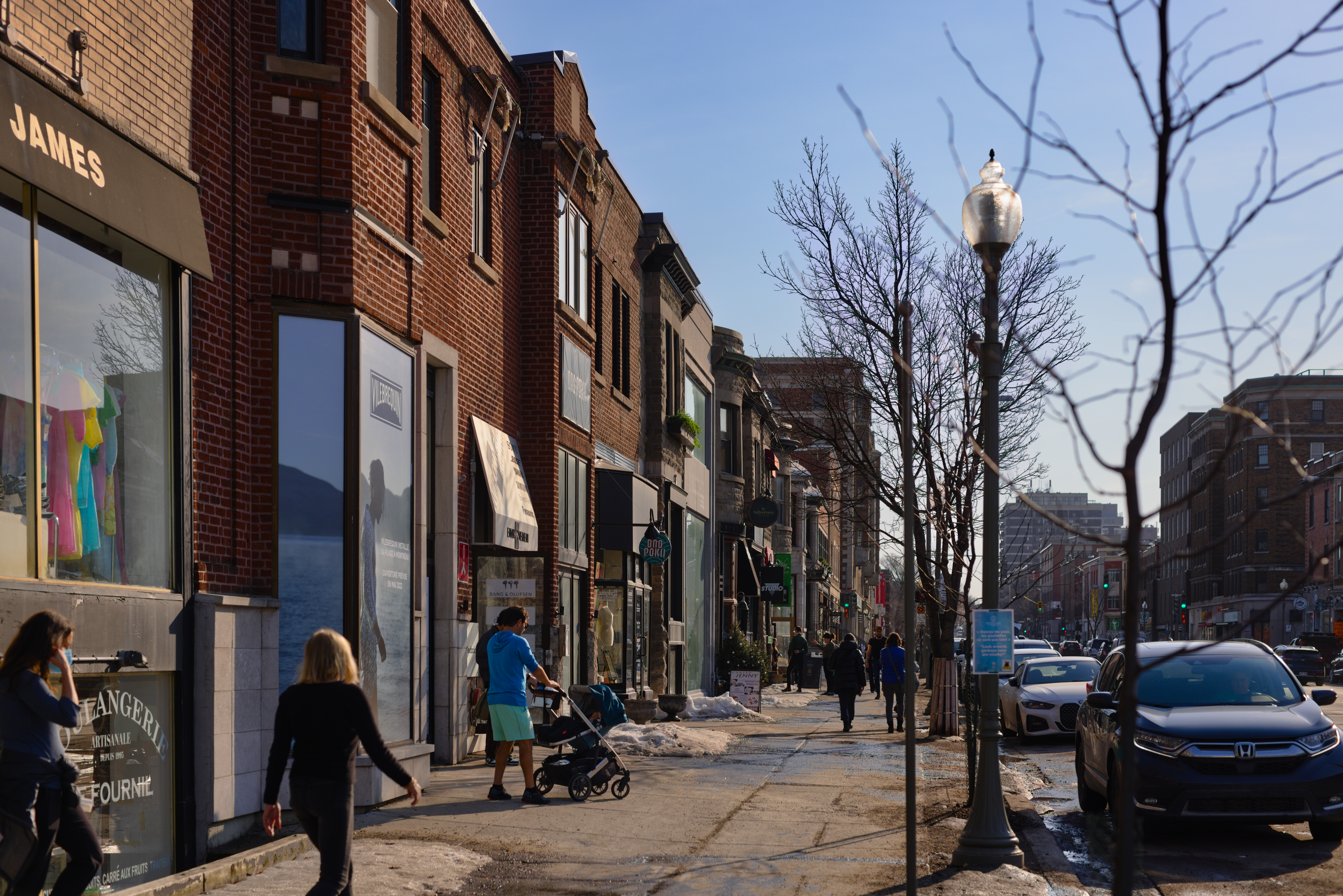
Sherbrooke Street in the commercial district of Victoria Village, in the western part of Westmount.

There are several small commercial districts on Sherbrooke Street from the city's western boundary to the intersection of Sherbrooke Street and Victoria Avenue ("Victoria Village"), on Saint Catherine Street across from Place Alexis Nihon, on Greene Avenue and on De Maisonneuve Boulevard near the Atwater metro station.

=== Parks ===
There are several parks within the city, including Westmount Park and King George Park (also known as Murray Hill). Summit Woods, a popular urban forest and dog run, is located within Summit Circle.

==== Westmount Park ====
Located between Sherbrooke Street and De Maisonneuve Boulevard to the north and south, and Melville and Lansdowne Avenue to the east and west, this 1,141,002 sq ft (106,002.6 m^{2}) park is the second largest in Westmount.

The landscaping design was undertaken in 1912 by M.J. Manning, and comprises large playing fields at the east and south sides, and Westmount Arena and adjacent swimming pool at the southwest corner. The central area contains an extensive playground, footpaths, ponds and wading pools, and tennis courts. Westmount Public Library, built in 1897, Victoria Hall, and a large greenhouse are located on the north side. Westmount Park United Church is adjacent to the park to the west.

== Demographics ==
Historical populations
Year	Pop.	±%
1966	24,107	—
1971	23,600	−2.1%
1976	22,153	−6.1%
1981	20,480	−7.6%
1986	20,011	−2.3%
1991	20,239	+1.1%
1996	20,420	+0.9%
2001	19,727	−3.4%
2006	20,494	+3.9%
2011	19,931	−2.7%
2016	20,312	+1.9%
2021	19,658	−3.2%
Source: Statistics Canada

According to the Office québécois de la langue française, Westmount has been officially recognized as a bilingual municipality since 2 November 2005.

In the 2021 Census of Population conducted by Statistics Canada, Westmount had a population of 19,658 living in 8,591 of its 9,423 total private dwellings, a change of −3.2% from its 2016 population of 20,312. With a land area of 4.04 km^{2} (1.56 sq mi), it had a population density of 4,865.8/km^{2} (12,602.5/sq mi) in 2021.

Home language (2016)
Language	Population	Percentage (%)
English	12,920	69%
French	3,705	20%
Other	2,170	11%

Mother tongue (2016)
Language	Population	Percentage (%)
English	10,225	54%
French	4,235	22%
Other	4,600	24%

Visible minorities (2016)
Ethnicity	Population	Percentage (%)
Not a visible minority	16,225	82.0%
Visible minorities	3,565	18.0%

StatsCan lists the median after-tax income in 2020 as $44,800, and an average after-tax income of $98,500. The three largest occupation categories were management, business, and "education, law and social, community and government services"; each of these sectors employed about 20% of Westmount workers.

== Government ==
=== Municipal ===
Since regaining its status as a city, Westmount is governed by a City Council made up of a mayor and eight "district" councillors. The current mayor of Westmount is Michael Stern, who was elected on November 2, 2025, following the retirement of Christina Smith. Stern has the distinction of being the first Mayor elected to the post without any previous experience as an elected official since the 1980s. In addition to the local city council, Westmount is represented by its mayor on the Montreal Agglomeration Council.

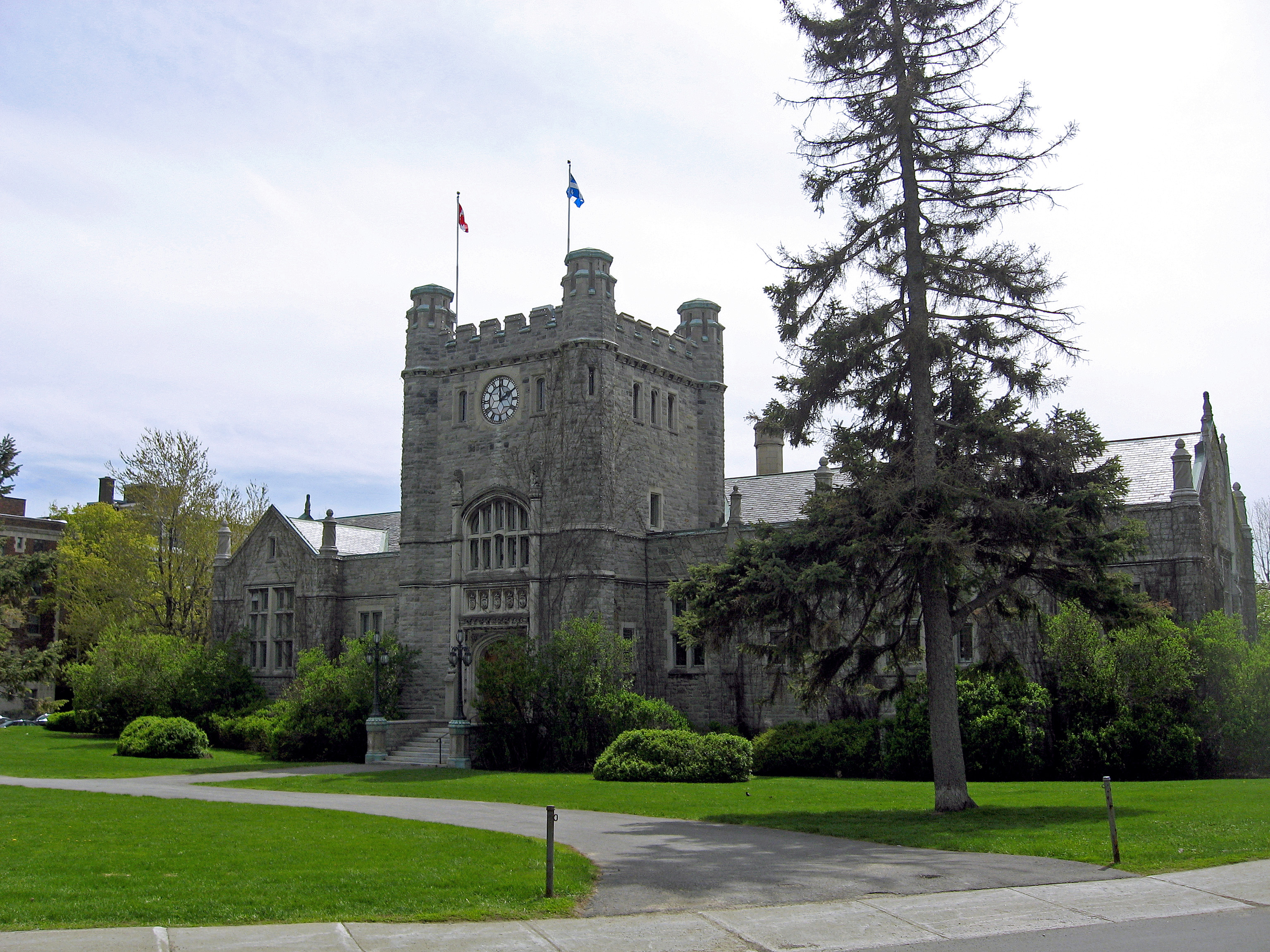
Westmount City Hall

Westmount City Council 2025-2029
District number	Councillor
District 1	Antonio D’Amico
District 2	Jonathan Chomski
District 3	Jeff J. Shamie
District 4	Gurveen K. Chadha
District 5	Shawn Moss
District 6	Paul Levine
District 7	Matthew E. Aronson
District 8	Kathleen Kez

=== Former mayors ===
List of former mayors:

- Eustache Prud'homme (1874–1875)
- James Kewley Ward (1875–1884)
- Alexander Cowper Hutchison (1884–1887)
- Thomas Patton (1887–1890)
- John MacFarlane (1890–1891)
- Matthew Hutchinson (1891–1894)
- James Henry Redfern (1894–1896)
- Frederick William Evans (1896–1898)
- James Robert Walker (1898–1900)
- William Douw Lighthall (1900–1903)
- Alexander S. George Cross (1903–1905)
- Charles-Albert Duclos (1905–1906)
- James W. Knox (1906–1907)
- William Galbraith (1907–1909)
- William Henry Trenholme (1909–1911)
- William Rutherford (1911–1913)
- John MacKergow (1913–1919)
- Peter William MacLagan (1919–1927)
- George Hogg (1927–1933)
- John Jenkins (1933–1939)
- Walter Alfred Merrill (1939–1945)
- R. Percy Adams (1945–1949)
- James S. Cameron (1949–1953)
- Roy L. Campbell (1953–1955)
- James Arthur de Lalanne (1955–1957)
- Aimé Sydney Bruneau (1957–1959)
- J. C. Cushing (1959–1963)
- Chipman Hazen Drury (1963–1965)
- M. L. Tucker (1965–1968)
- Peter Michael McEntyre (1968–1971)
- Paul A. Ouimet (1971–1975)
- Donald Charles MacCallum (1975–1983)
- Brian O'Neil Gallery (1983–1987)
- May Ebbitt (Cutler) (1987–1991)
- Peter Francis Trent (1991–2002, 2009–2017)
- Karin Marks (2006–2009)
- Christina M. Smith (2017–2025)
- Michael Stern (2025–Present)

=== Provincial and Federal ===
Throughout Quebec, Westmount is known as an overwhelmingly Liberal riding, both federally and provincially.

On the federal level, Westmount is represented in the Notre-Dame-de-Grâce—Westmount riding. The riding was won by Anna Gainey in the 2023 federal byelections.

Provincially, the city is represented in the riding of Westmount–Saint-Louis by MNA Jennifer Maccarone of the Quebec Liberal Party.

== Sports ==
Westmount was home of the Montreal Arena, the third arena in history to be built specifically for hockey. It was the home rink for the Montreal Wanderers, one of the great teams of the early hockey era, as well as the legendary Montreal Canadiens. The arena burned down in 1918, causing the Wanderers to disband.

In 2010, Mayor Peter Trent unveiled a $38-million project to demolish the old arena and create two new rinks, a larger swimming pool, refurbished tennis courts, and an extra 4,000-square-metre (1-acre) of green space. In the fall of 2013, the new Westmount Recreation Centre opened. It is home to the Westmount Wings, Lasalle/Westmount Cobras and was the home of the Westmount Predators that are no longer active.

Westmount is home to the Westmount Lynx Lacrosse Club, which has field lacrosse teams for boys and girls aged 8–16.

Westmount is also home of the oldest active rugby club in North America, the Westmount Rugby Club.

In addition, the city's swim team, the Westmount Dolphins, won the 2007 Section B Alps finals.

Tennis star Eugenie Bouchard grew up in Westmount.

== Education ==
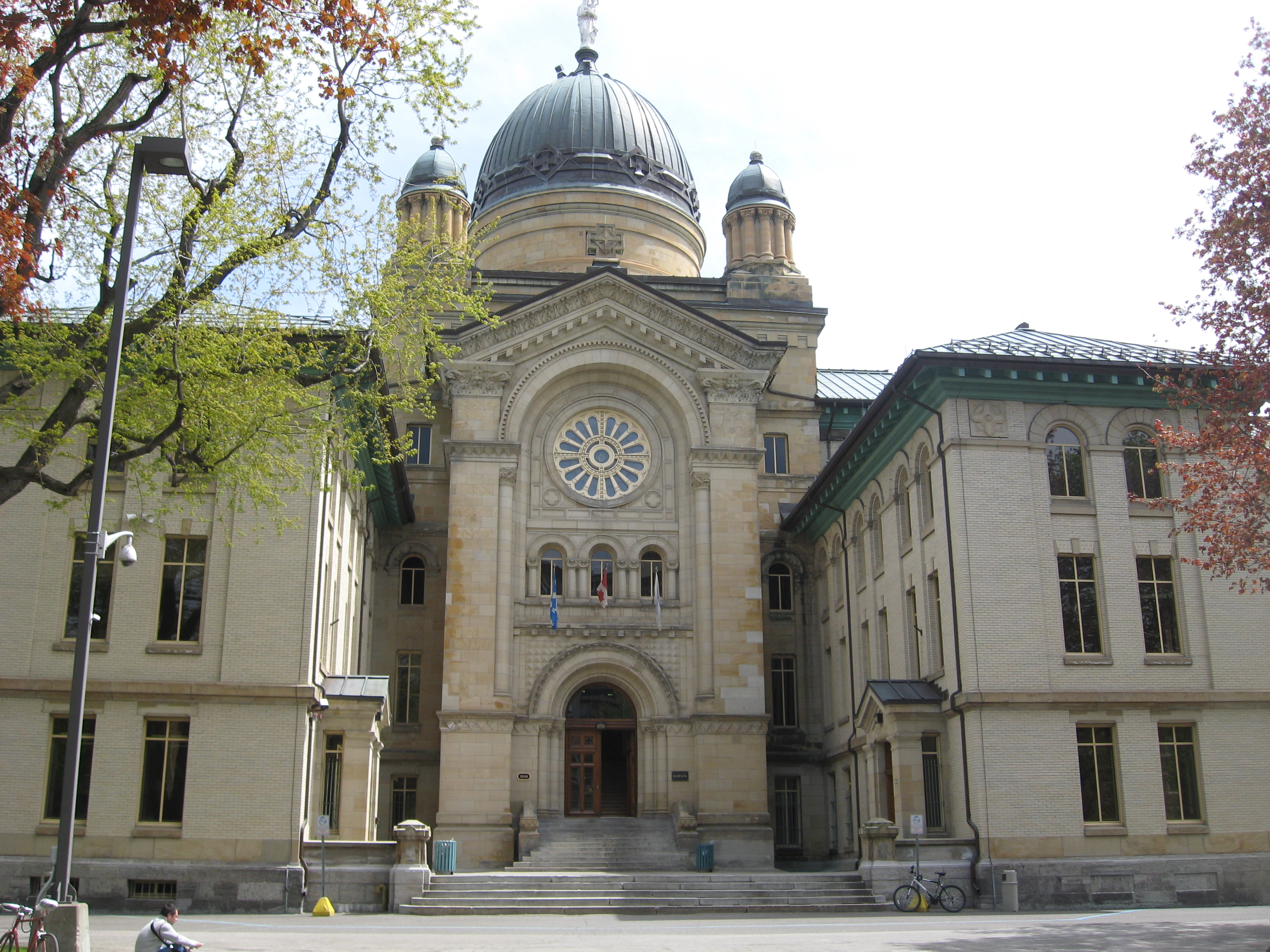
Dawson College, Sherbrooke Street

The city is home to two CEGEPs: the public anglophone Dawson College and the private anglophone Marianopolis College.

The Commission scolaire de Montréal (CSDM) operates French-language schools in Westmount.

English-language public schools in Westmount are operated by the English Montreal School Board (EMSB). These include Westmount High School, its sister elementary school Westmount Park School and Roslyn Elementary School, which is significant for introducing the first French Immersion Program on the Island of Montreal in 1968.

Westmount is also home to several private schools, including coeducational St. George's School of Montreal as well as Miss Edgar's and Miss Cramp's School, The Study and the French-language Villa Sainte-Marcelline for girls and Selwyn House School for boys.

The Montreal Hoshuko School, a supplementary Japanese school serving Japanese nationals and Japanese Canadians in the Montreal area, previously held classes at the Westmount Park School in Westmount.

== Twin towns – sister cities ==
Westmount is twinned with:

- Rimouski, Quebec, Canada (since 1968)

== Notable people ==
Musicians Leonard Cohen and Sam Roberts were born in Westmount, as was the actress and comedian Caroline Rhea. The city is currently home to many notable Montrealers, including the author Roch Carrier. The former federal cabinet minister and astronaut Marc Garneau lived in Westmount before his death.

Former United States vice president Kamala Harris lived for part of her youth in the area, and attended Westmount High School.

== Fiction ==
Westmount has been the setting for a number of novels. Gwethalyn Graham's World War II novel Earth and High Heaven told the story of a romance between a wealthy English girl from Westmount and a Jewish lawyer from Northern Ontario. David Montrose' 1950s hard-boiled detective novel, The Crime on Cote des Neiges, was translated into French as Meurtre à Westmount. Daniel Richler's Kicking Tomorrow is a bildungsroman of a teenager growing up in a Westmount family in the 1970s, mentioning how the students at Westmount High School were "famous in the City for the achievement of being perpetually stoned." Claire Rothman's novel Lear's Shadow takes place amidst an outdoor summer production of the Shakespeare play in Westmount Park. Edward Openshaw Phillips wrote a series of mystery novels starring an anglophone Westmount lawyer, most of which were set in Westmount.

== See also ==
- List of anglophone communities in Quebec
- List of former boroughs
- Montreal Merger
- Municipal reorganization in Quebec
- The Westmount Examiner, a now-defunct newspaper
