= La Station (community center) =

Service station in Montreal

Coordinates: 45.4601°N 73.5446°W

- Location: Montreal
- Website: montreal.ca/en/places/la-station

La Station, originally the Nuns' Island gas station (French: Station-service de l'Île-des-Sœurs), is a modernist-style community center on Nuns' Island in Montreal, Quebec. It was designed by Ludwig Mies van der Rohe in 1969.

== History ==
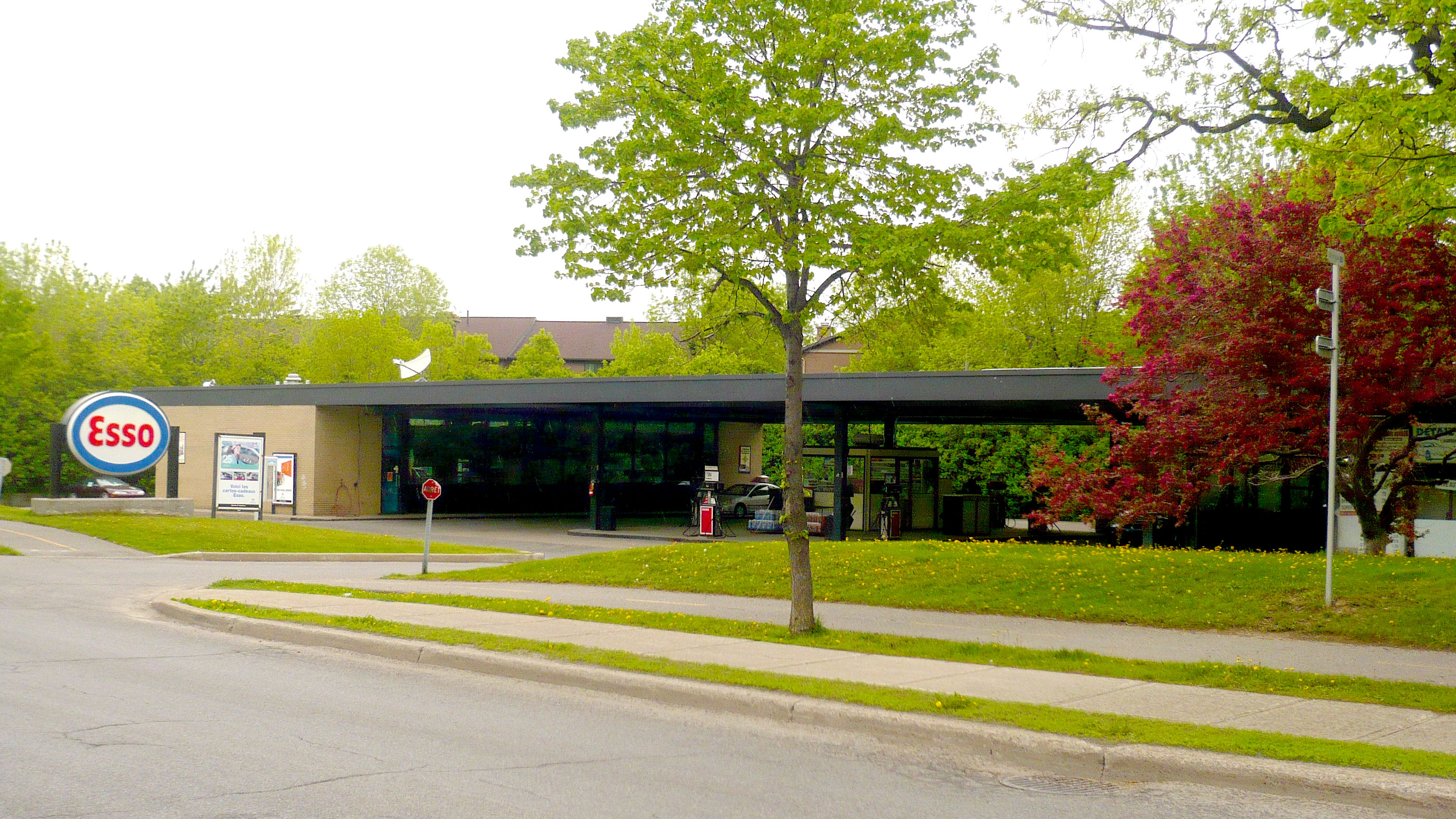
The filling station, in 2007.

It was built as a filling station in 1969 from a project of Ludwig Mies van der Rohe. Closed for several years, it was later converted to a community centre.

It was the first gas station on the Island of Montreal commissioned by Imperial Oil. It was also one of four buildings that Mies designed on Nuns' Island.

=== Community centre ===
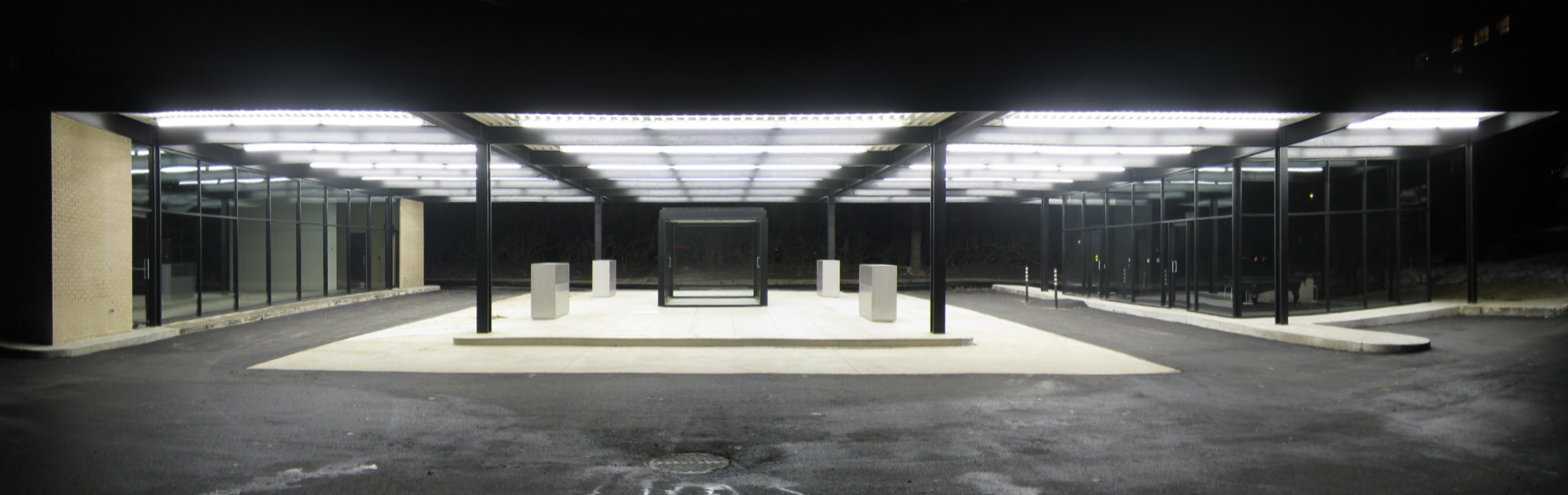
"La Station" lighting at night

When the filling station closed in 2008, the borough of Verdun transformed the building into a community arts centre, La Station. Eric Gauthier was the lead architect on the project, which saw the two glass pavilions rebuilt to their original 3,000- and 1,000-square-foot (93 m^{2}) sizes. The community centre opened in February 2012.

La Station is a community centre for teens and people over 50 years of age. The two main buildings are called the salle blanche (English: white room) and salle noire (English: black room), after their floor colours. The original glass-enclosed attendant's booth serves as a display case of Mies' and the building's history, with the former fuel dispensers marked by ventilation shafts. The centre uses geothermal energy.

== See also ==
- Westmount Square
