= De Maisonneuve Boulevard =

Boulevard in Montreal, Quebec, Canada

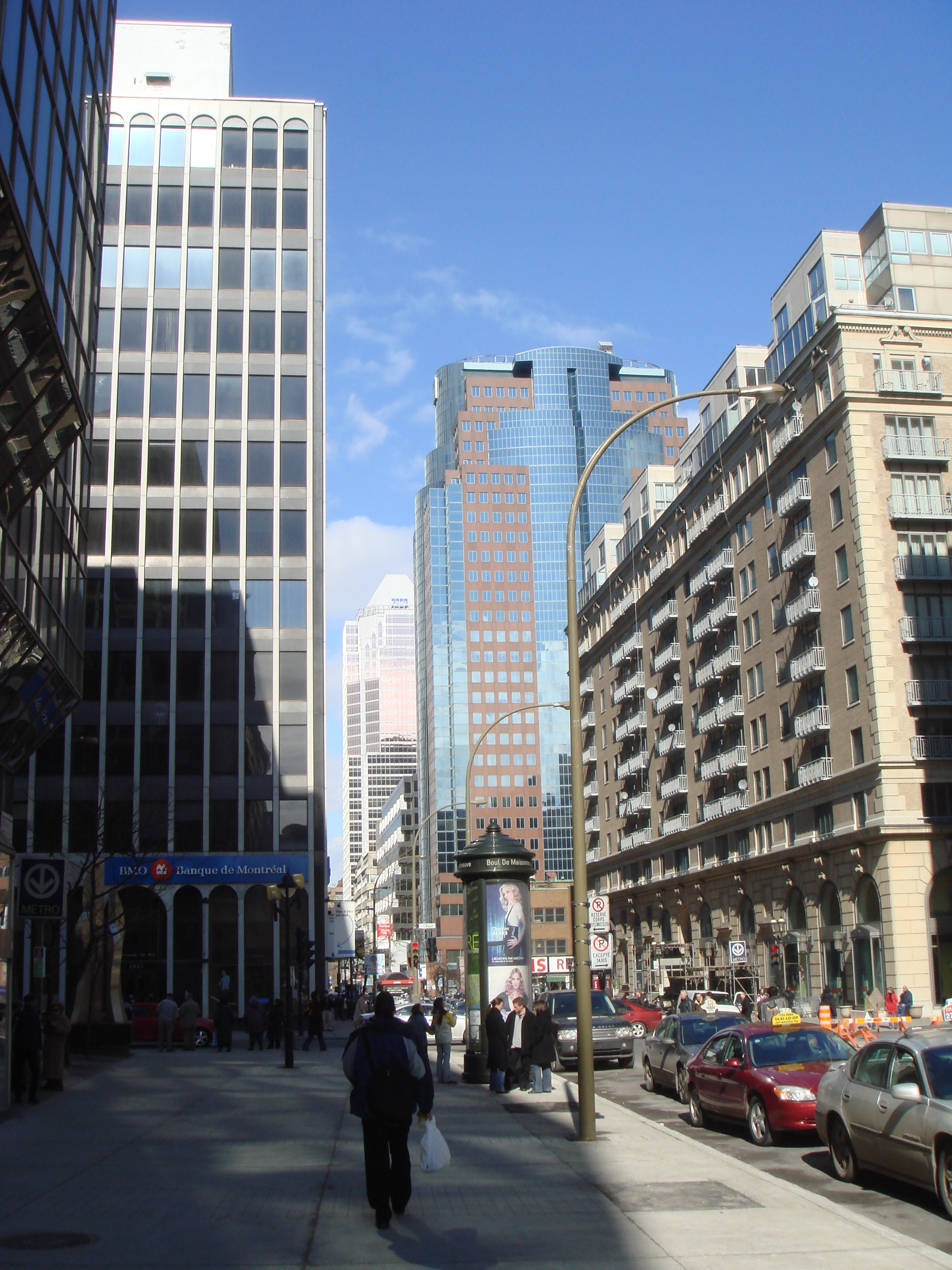
- De Maisonneuve Boulevard, Les Cours Mont-Royal at right.
- Interactive map of De Maisonneuve Boulevard
- Native name: boulevard De Maisonneuve (French)
- Former names: Western, Saint-Luc, Burnside Place
- Owner: Cities of Montreal and Westmount
- Length: 11 km (6.8 mi)
- Location: Montreal and Westmount
- Coordinates: 45.510877°N 73.56508°W
- West end: Rue West Broadway, Notre-Dame-de-Grâce
- Major junctions: R-335; A-15
- East end: Rue du Havre, Sainte-Marie

Construction
- Inauguration: November 5, 1966

De Maisonneuve Boulevard (officially in French: boulevard De Maisonneuve) is a major westbound boulevard located in downtown Montreal, Quebec, Canada. It is named after the founder of Montreal, Paul Chomedey de Maisonneuve. It is a one-way street westbound.

De Maisonneuve Boulevard is about 11 kilometres (6.8 mi) long and begins on Du Havre Street in the east end (one block east of Frontenac Street in the borough of Ville-Marie), and ends at West Broadway in the city's west end (in the borough of Côte-des-Neiges-Notre-Dame-de-Grâce) near Concordia University's Loyola Campus. The street also runs through the wealthy enclave of Westmount, and is cut in two by Westmount Park.

== History ==
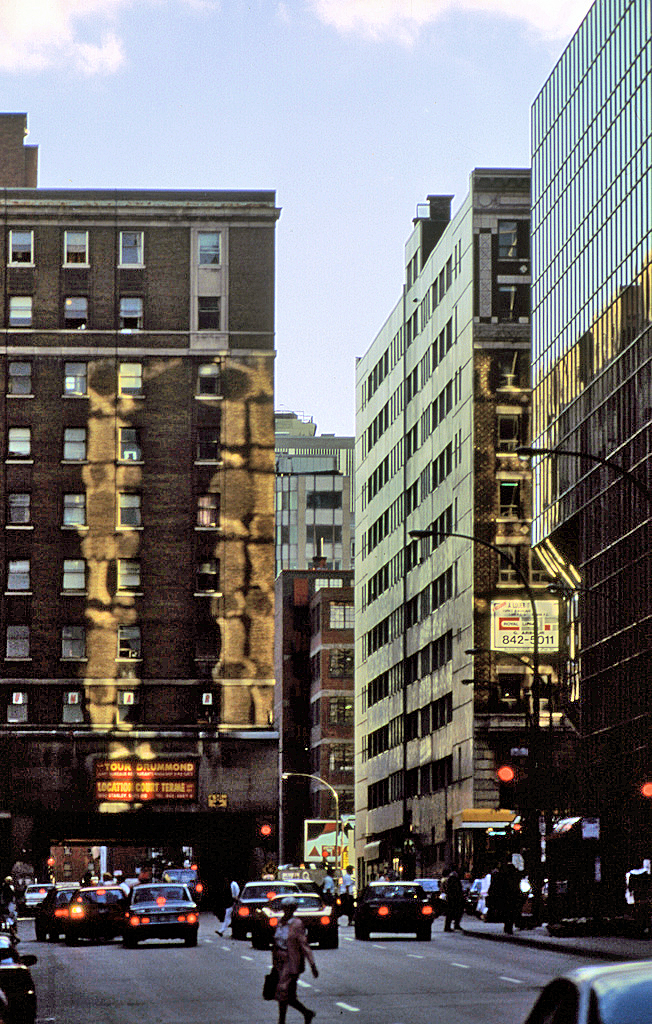
Tour Drummond (Drummond Court), the building on the left at the back that has since been demolished, contained a tunnel over De Maisonneuve Boulevard.

De Maisonneuve was created as a single street in 1966, following the construction of the Montreal Metro. From west to east, De Maisonneuve took the route of: Western, from Decarie to Atwater Street; St. Luc, from Atwater to Guy Street; Burnside, from Stanley Street to Union Street; Ontario Street, from Union to Jeanne-Mance, and De Montigny, from Saint Laurent Boulevard to du Havre. Today, Ontario Street still remains, as does a small section of De Montigny, from Saint Laurent to Saint Urbain Street.

During the last 20 years, the multifunctional character of De Maisonneuve Boulevard has increased. Institutions already located along the street such as the Université du Québec à Montréal, Place des Arts and Concordia University have built new buildings. Other institutions have also built new buildings on the street such as the Grande Bibliothèque, the Cinémathèque québécoise and the Salle Pierre-Mercure.

In the central business district, residential condominium buildings, such as Le Roc Fleuri and Le 1200 Ouest (Tours Lépine), have been constructed in the mid-2000s between the office towers which were built in the late 1980s and early 1990s.

== Claire Morissette bike path ==
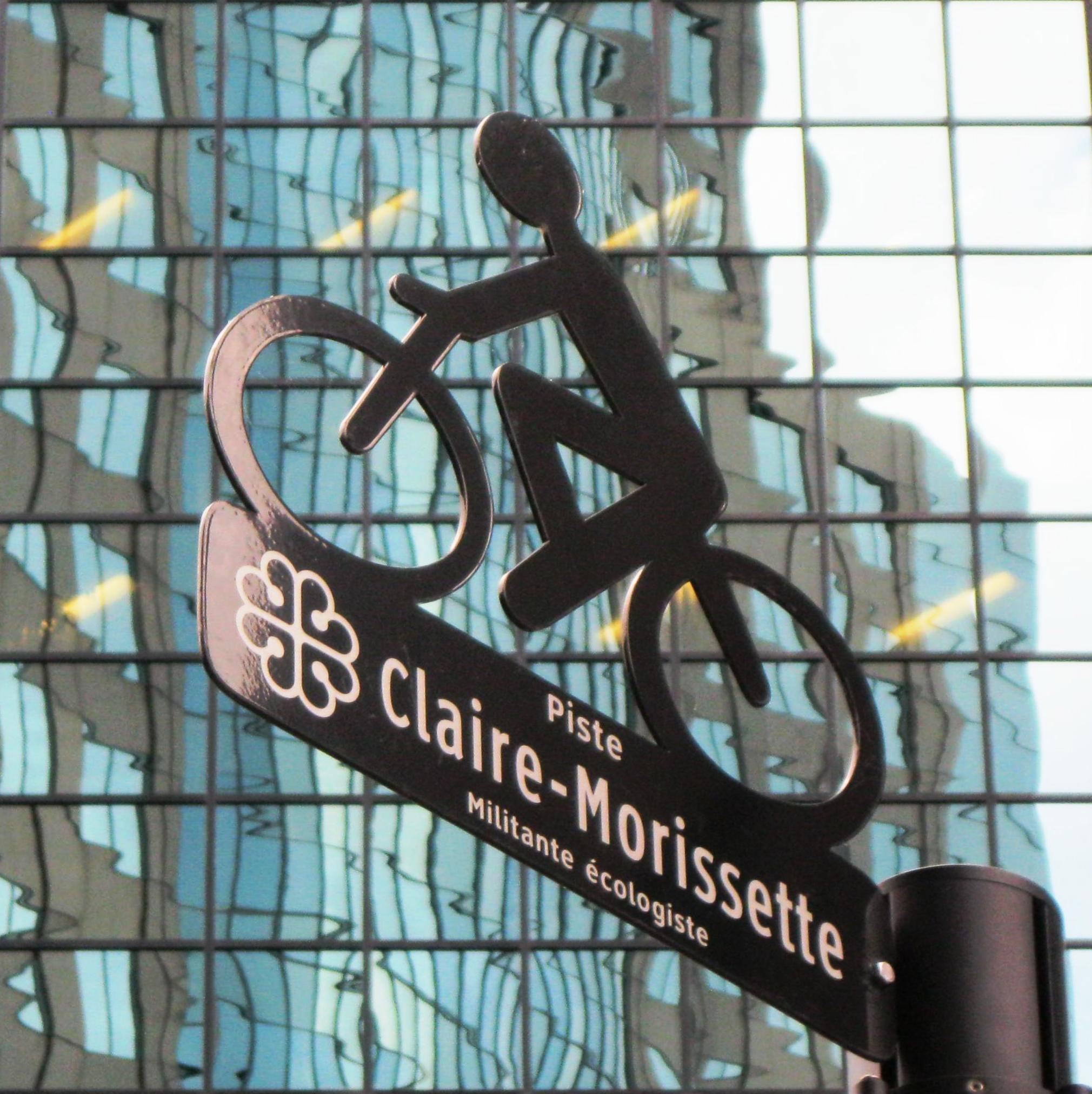
The signage of the Claire-Morissette bike path.

In 2007, the city completed a 3.4 km (2 mile) year-round bicycle path along De Maisonneuve through downtown Montreal, from Berri Street to Atwater Street. As of the 2009-2010 winter season, it is the only bike path cleared of snow. A report blamed the path's construction for damage to an underground pedestrian tunnel, part of Montreal's Underground City.

On June 16, 2008, Montreal city council voted unanimously to name the path after the late Montreal cycling activist Claire Morissette.

== Points of interest ==
Dawson College and the seven linked downtown malls are located on this street. Other notable buildings include the Grande Bibliothèque, Université du Québec à Montréal, Place des Arts, Les Cours Mont-Royal, both of Concordia University's campuses (Sir George Williams and Loyola) and Montreal Forum.

== Transit ==
The Green line of the Montreal Metro runs under this street in between Papineau and Atwater. The Metro was constructed under this street to serve Saint Catherine Street, to the south, to avoid a prolonged disruption of commercial activity on that street. Vendôme station, on the Orange line, is also located on this boulevard.
