= Bianca Della Porta =

Canadian ice hockey and rugby player

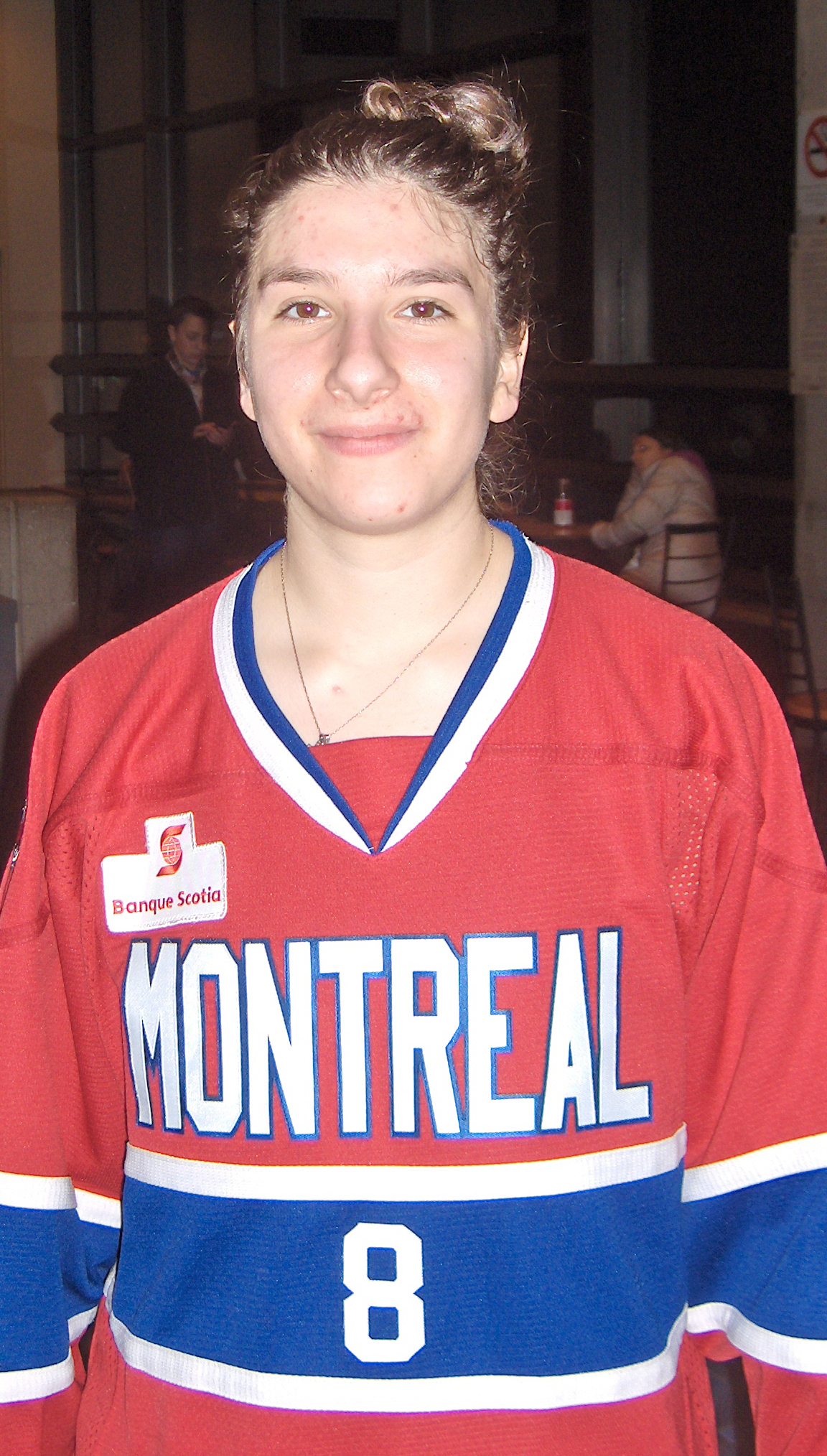
- Della Porta in 2011
- Born: 23 March 1991 (age 35) Dorval, Quebec, Canada
- Position: Defender
- Shot: Left
- Played for: Montreal Stars
- Playing career: 2000–2012

Bianca Della Porta (born 23 March 1991 in Dorval, Quebec) is a Canadian ice hockey and rugby player who has played for professional teams in both sports.

== Hockey career ==
Bianca Della Porta began playing hockey at the age of 8. She played several seasons with the Midget AA Sélects from Lac Saint-Louis. In the 2008–09 season, she helped the Sélects win the Dodge Cup.

The following seasons she played with the Dawson College Blues in the AA College Women's Hockey League.

In 2011–12 Della Porta joined the Montreal Stars in the Canadian Women's Hockey League (CWHL). In her first season, she was the youngest player on the team. In 27 games, she scored 2 goals and made 7 assists. The team were 2012 Clarkson Cup champions.

In 2012–13 Della Porta played for the McGill Martlets, helping them to achieve an undefeated regular season in the Canadian Interuniversity Sport league (CIAU). However, the team lost both games in the playoffs.

== Rugby career ==
Della Porta played for the McGill Martlets women's rugby team in the 2014–15 and 2015–16 seasons. In her final season the Martlets finished fifth in the eight-team RSEQ conference, missing the playoffs.

In 2017 Della Porta played for the Montreal Barbarians in the Fédération de Rugby du Québec (FRQ).

== Coaching and non-sports career ==
In 2016 Della Porta graduated from McGill University with a bachelor's degree in health and physical education.

In 2016–17 Della Porta was a women's rugby assistant coach for John Abbott College; the team began the season with six consecutive wins. She had also coached at hockey training camps.

In 2017 she began teaching science, music and physical education at Dorval Elementary school.

== Honours and distinctions ==
- 2012 Clarkson Cup champion
- Champion of a regular season championship in the CWHL
- Participation in the AA Collegiate All-Star Game (2011)
- 2009 Dodge Cup champion
