= Atwater Library =

Independent library in Westmount, Quebec

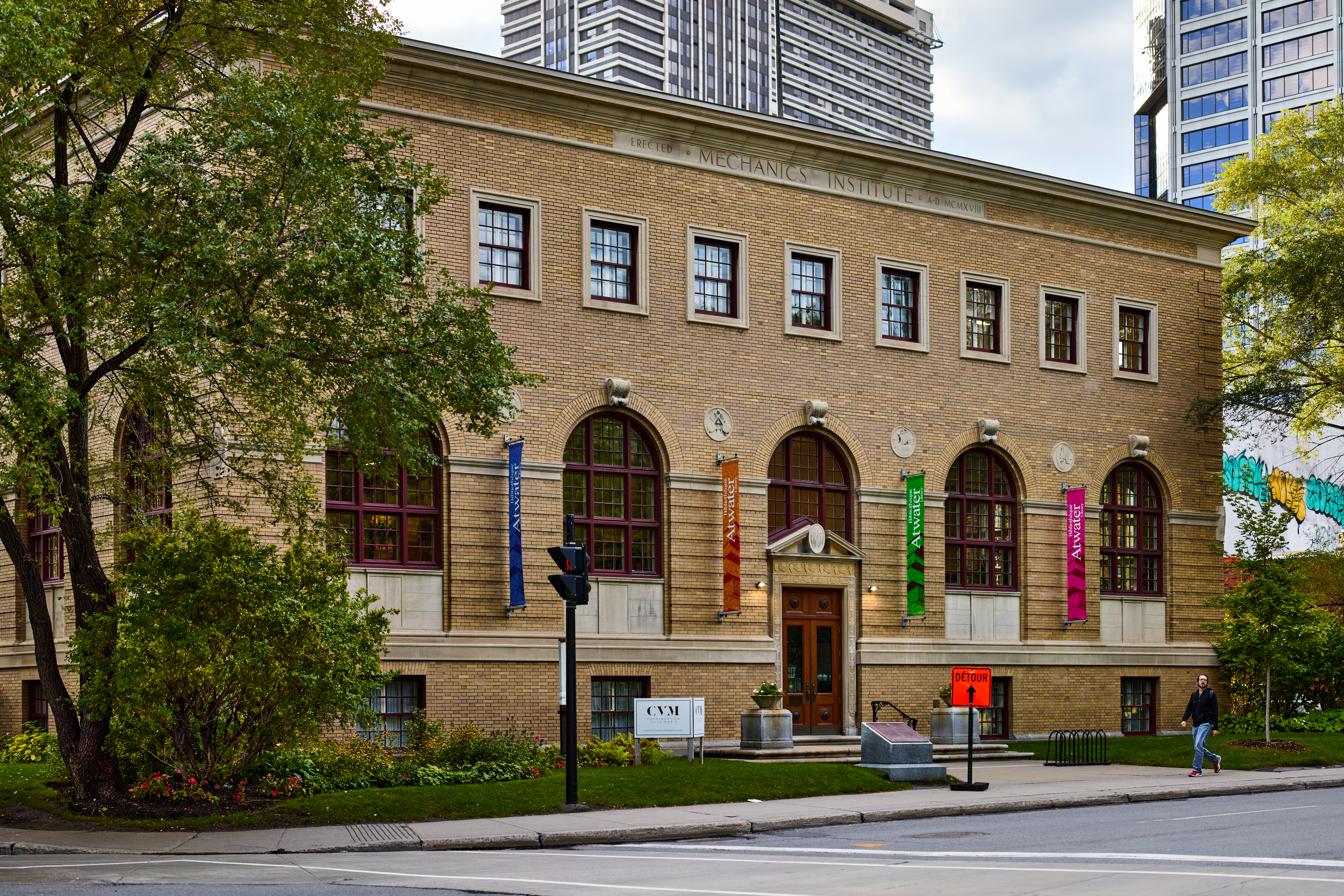
- The Atwater Library seen from Atwater Avenue
- Interactive map of the Atwater Library area

General information
- Location: 1200 Atwater Avenue, Westmount, Quebec, Canada
- Coordinates: 45°29′19.17″N 73°35′3.41″W
- Opened: 1828
- Owner: Privately operated

The Atwater Library and Computer Centre (French: Bibliothèque et centre d’informatique Atwater, officially the Atwater Library of the Mechanics' Institute of Montreal) is an independent community library in Westmount, Quebec, Canada, operating the oldest subscription library service in the country. It is located at 1200 Atwater Avenue. It is a privately operated, non-government, nonprofit organization, and a registered charity. It was founded in 1828.

== History ==
The building itself was completed in 1920.

The Atwater Library was home of the first Mechanics' Institute in Canada. It is also the oldest subscription library in Canada. It was first formed in 1828 when citizens recognized the need for educating workers for the number of industries that were expanding in Montreal. The Atwater Library is also the last Mechanics' Institute building in Canada serving its original purpose. The Atwater Library of the Mechanics' Institute of Montreal was recognized as a National Historic Site of Canada in 2005.

== Services ==
The Atwater Library offers a variety of services and events to both members and to residents of the greater Montreal area. Membership is not limited to a specific municipality because it is not a public library.

- Membership: Membership costs between $10.00 for three months up to $35.00 for a full year, with special pricing available to students, seniors, members of the Québec Writers' Federation, RECLAIM members, and former YMCA refugee residents with a permanent address.
- Library services: Their collection currently offers almost 40 000 in multiple forms of media, mostly in English, as well as special collections and historical archives. In 2015, they created the Seed Bank, a seed-sharing program.
- Computer services: They offer a bank of computers open to the public, provide free Wi-Fi, offer courses and workshops in a dedicated computer classroom, and operate the Digital Literacy Project which partners with community groups to teach technical skills relating to computers to youth and marginalized adults.
- Digital literacy: The Atwater Library teaches the skills and knowledge to engage with digital technology and creative new media. They work with partner organizations and schools to offer age-appropriate activities to users, and they share their knowledge on seniors using digital media with international partners and peers.
- Financial literacy: The library partners with relevant organizations to offer educational presentations and workshops on the financial issues and skills relevant to specific groups. In 2017, they focused on the needs of young families, and their 2019 series focuses on retirement and estate planning for seniors.
- Room rentals: The Atwater Library offers four facilities for hourly rentals: an auditorium, a computer classroom, a reading room, and a computer centre.
- Exhibitions: They accept community and school proposals for pictures and paintings to be exhibited throughout their heritage building.
- Events: They host occasional and recurring events such as readings, lectures, community gatherings, and fundraising events.

== Community involvement ==
In addition to regular courses and workshops (e.g. on the use of computers), the Atwater Library and Computer Center are behind many events, special projects and exhibitions in partnerships with many organizations. One of their current projects is the Digital literacy project which engages people in creative new media production. Eric Craven (project director) and Dr. Line Grenier presented a paper about the project at the European Communication Research and Education Association Conference (ECREA) in Lisbon in November 2014 as part of a panel called New Media and Older People – Age, Narratives and Normativities. Two videos were presented and are still available here and here. The ALCC also participated in the National Human Library Day in Canada. They collaborated with researchers on projects like MemorySpace: Private Memories, Public Histories, a project capturing the life stories and history of a neighbourhood through photographs.

== See also ==
- List of National Historic Sites of Canada in Montreal
- Westmount Public Library, the other library in Westmount
