= Victoria Hall (Westmount, Quebec) =

Community centre in Westmount, QC, Canada

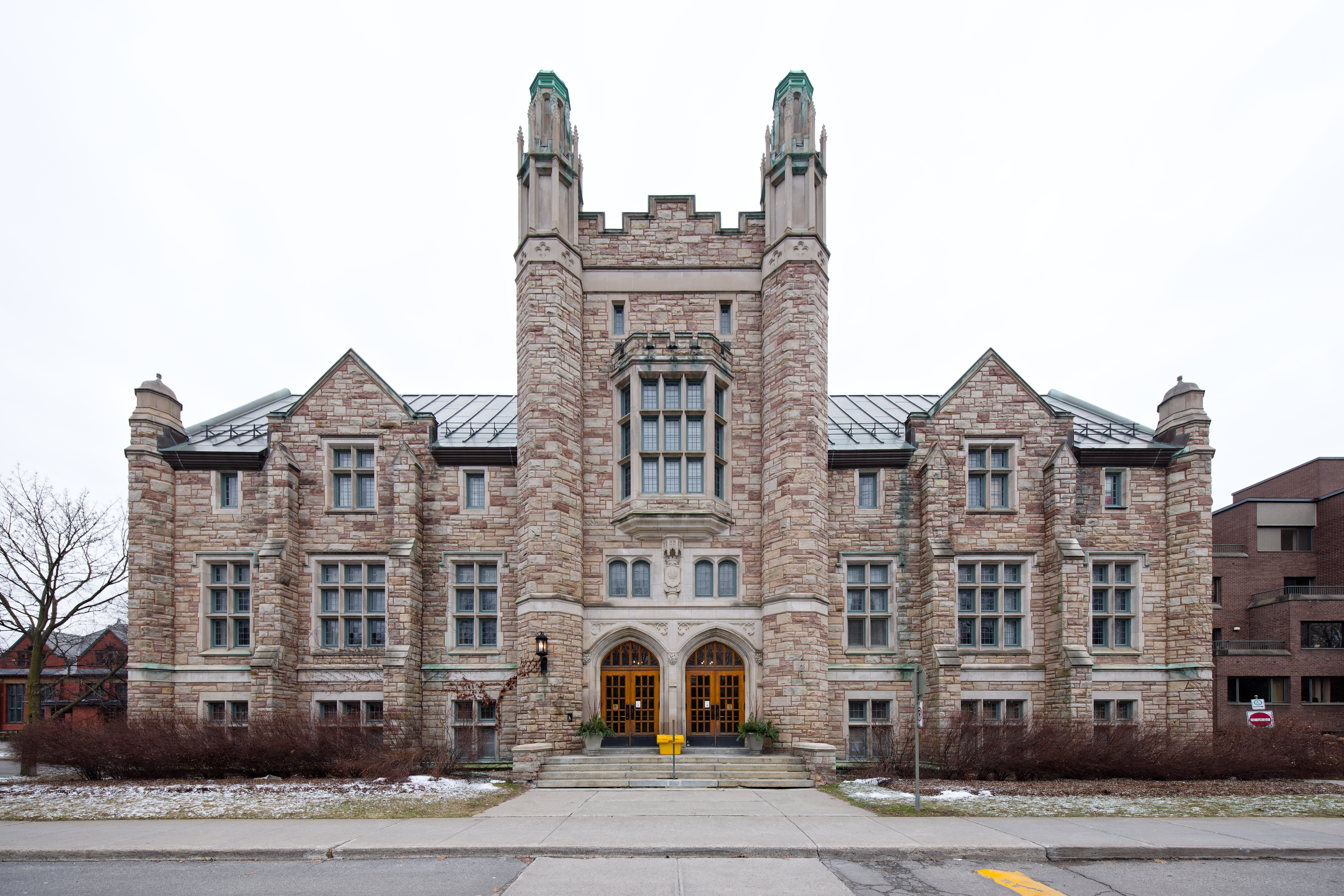
- Interactive map of the Victoria Hall area
- Former names: Victoria Jubilee Hall

General information
- Location: 4626 Sherbrooke Street West, Westmount, Quebec, Canada
- Coordinates: 45.481183°N 73.599948°W
- Renovated: 1998
- Owner: City of Westmount

Height
- Architectural: Tudor Revival

Technical details
- Material: Sandstone
- Floor count: 3
- Lifts/elevators: 1

Design and construction
- Architecture firm: Hutchison and Wood

Victoria Hall is located at 4626 Sherbrooke Street West in the City of Westmount, Quebec, Canada. It is situated adjacent to Westmount Public Library at the west side of Westmount Park. The original building, named Victoria Jubilee Hall, was destroyed by a fire in 1924 but was immediately rebuilt.

== Original building ==
The original named building, named Victoria Jubilee Hall, opened in 1899. It was built after a citizen petition for a community centre. The architect was Robert Findlay. He designed it using the same materials and in the same style as the adjacent Westmount Public Library. It contained the following:

- Public meeting room
- Lodge room
- Drill hall
- Bowling alley
- Billiard room
- Gymnasium
- Swimming pool

It was destroyed by fire in 1924.

== Present-day building ==
The present-day building was opened in 1925, and was designed by architects Alexander Cowper Hutchison and George W. Wood.

=== Exterior ===
It is three storeys tall, and is made in the neo-Tudor style of sandstone lined with Indiana freestone. Made of sandstone are the Gothic details, the crenellated, square tower, the four corner turrets at the sides, the buttresses supporting the two wings, as well as the oriel window located above the ogival doors. It is similar to Westmount City Hall in that both have a Tudor influence.

=== Interior ===
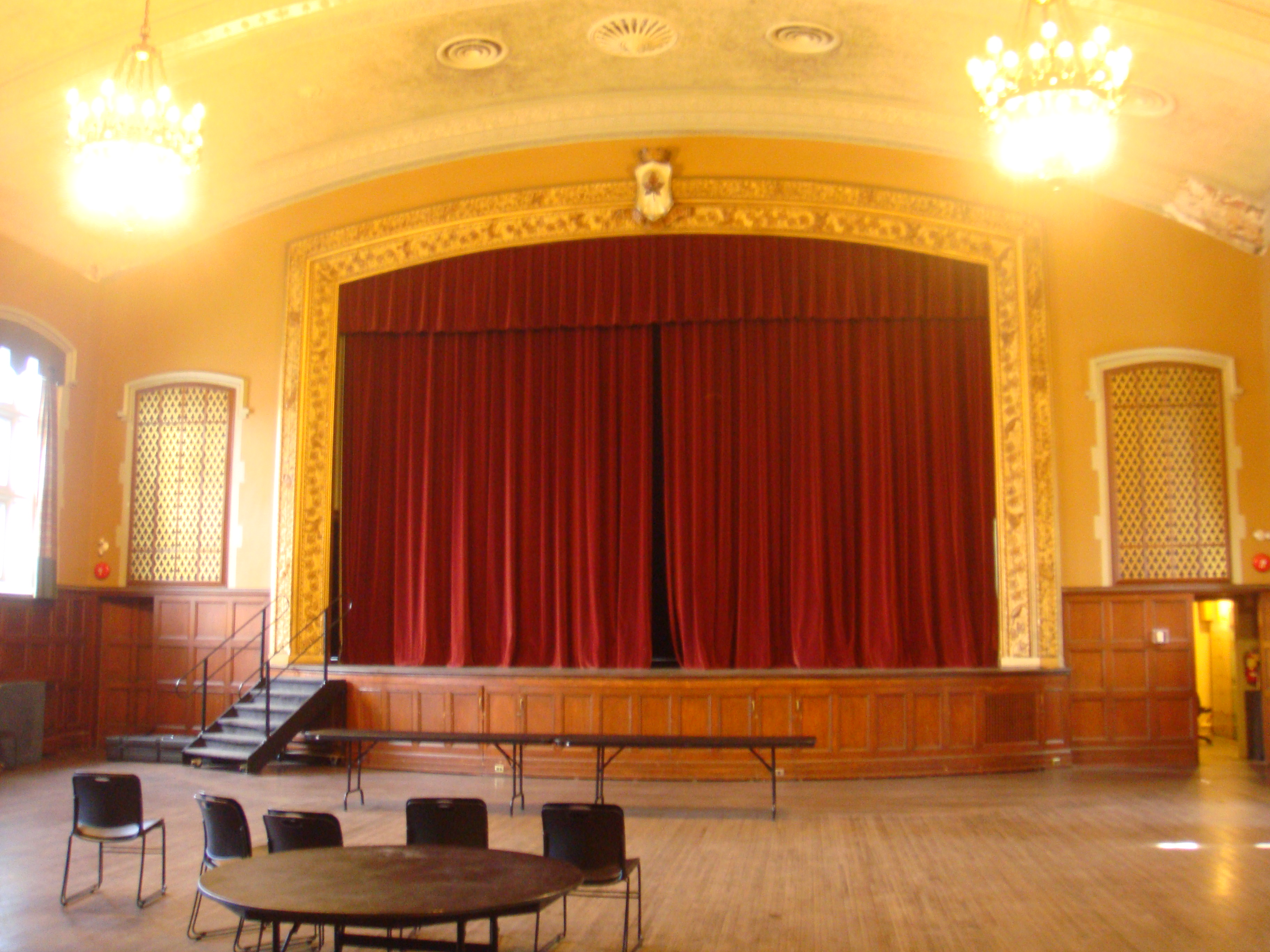
Main hall

In 1998, the architecture company Fournier, Gersovitz & Moss completely renovated and restored the building. This included the installation of an elevator and the creation of a gallery. The building contains a large hall with a balcony and stage. An upstairs room was once used for a Masonic lodge. The auditorium and stage are on the first and second floors, and is the main purpose of the building. This is atypical because the Traditionally, a town hall/opera house combination has an auditorium with a small stage located on the second floor, with the first floor being used for municipal offices and chambers.

Today, the building is used for meetings, social events, municipal courses, and concerts. Victoria Hall the main community centre for Westmount. It is also headquarters for the Community Events Division, which is responsible for coordinating local events, and also handling the administration of the building itself and the Gallery at Victoria Hall (see below).

Victoria Hall is also used as a venue for City Council events, cultural presentations, and recreational courses organized for all ages by the City of Westmount. Such courses and activities include bridge, tai chi, dance, fitness, music, and theatre.

== Gallery at Victoria Hall ==
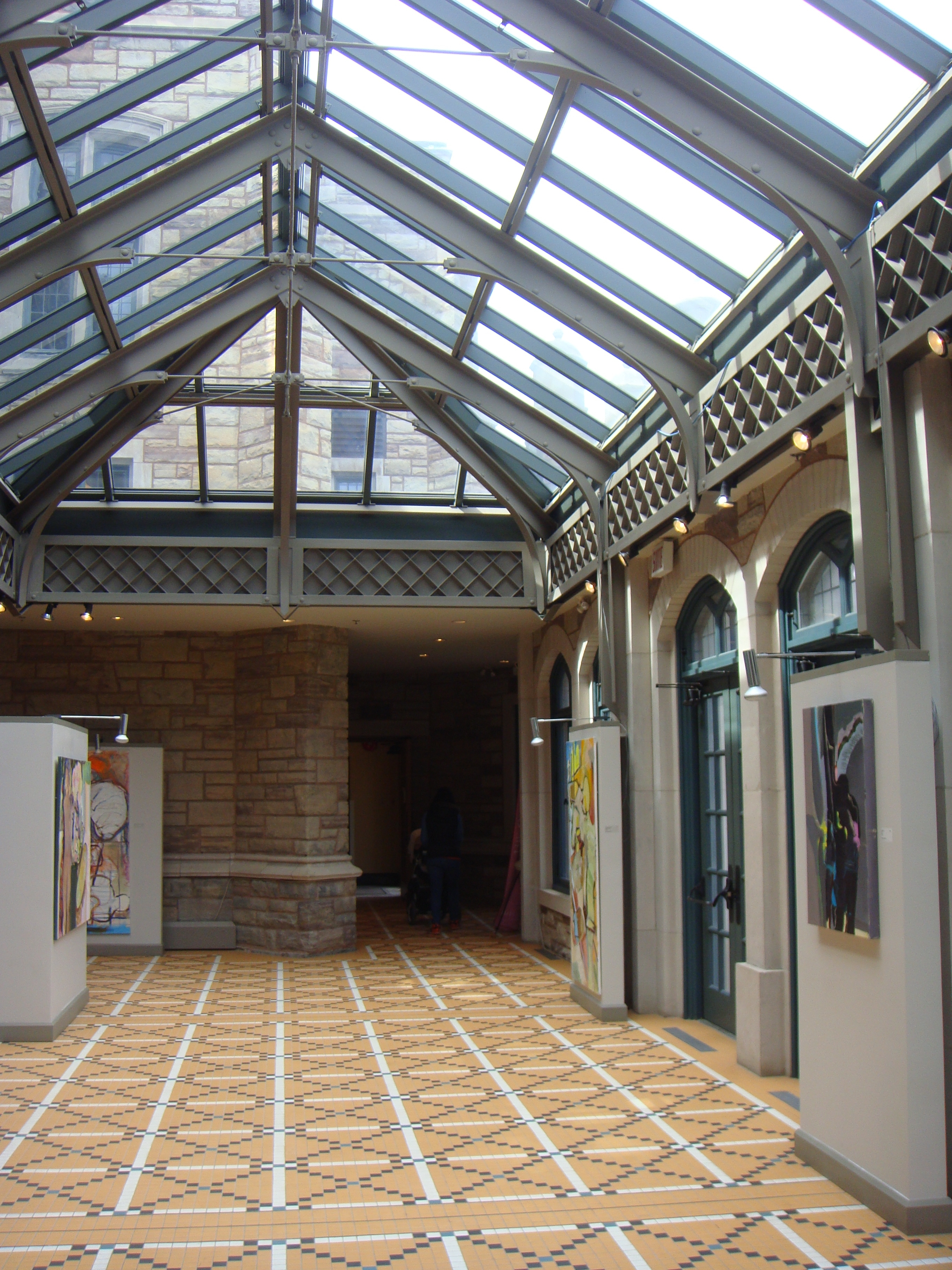
Gallery showing geometric floor tiles and French doors

The Gallery at Victoria Hall is adjacent to Victoria Hall, situated between the conservatory to the southeast and Victoria Hall at the north side. It is connected to Victoria Hall by a pedestrian link. This space, also designed by Fournier, Gersovitz & Moss, was opened in 1999. It purposely matches the exterior of the main Victoria Hall with neo-Tudor style, and is made of building materials that are somewhat alike. The interior has geometric floor tiles that are in the traditional British style. The building has French doors that provide access to a conservatory forecourt. This forecourt has perennial plants and linden trees that were planted in 2001.

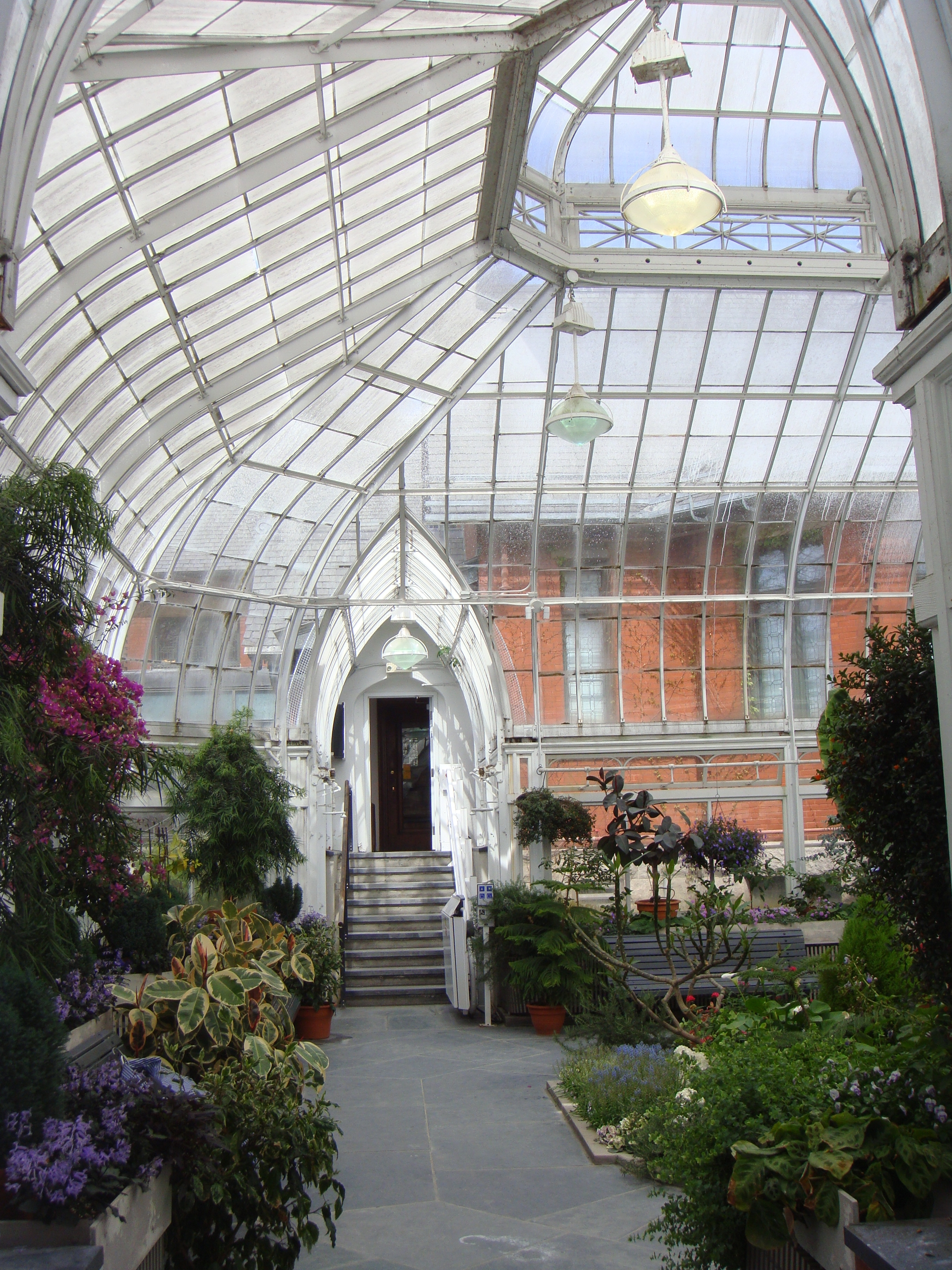
Conservatory viewed from entrance from Victoria Hall showing door leading to Westmount Public Library

The Gallery is host to temporary visual arts exhibitions by Westmounters, children talking part in the visual arts centre programmes, and employees of the city. It is also sometimes used for social events and lectures.
