= Westmount Park =

Park in Quebec, Canada

Westmount Park Parc Westmount
- A pond in the park

- Location within Montreal
- Location: Westmount, Quebec, Canada
- Coordinates: 45°28′52″N 73°35′50″W
- Area: 10.6 hectares (26 acres)
- Operator: City of Westmount
- Public transit: STM Bus: 63, 90, 24, 104, 138, 356

Westmount Park (French: Parc Westmount) is a public park in Westmount, Quebec, Canada. It is located on Sherbrooke Street West.

== History ==
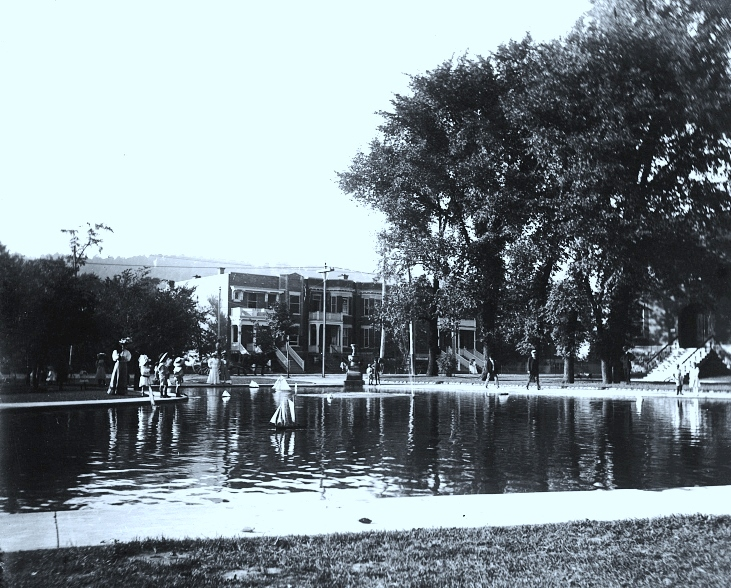
Westmount Park in 1908.

In 1892, the city of Westmount purchased 20 acres (8.1 ha) of land for a park in order to preserve its rustic appearance. A few years later, the park was expanded its boundaries from Sherbrooke Street to Western Avenue (today De Maisonneuve Boulevard). Since its expansion, it has occupied 26 acres (11 ha) of land.

In 1899, Quebec's first public library (Victoria Hall) was built in the park.

In 1912, J. Howard Manning landscaped the park on behalf of the city. The park's design was inspired by the work of Frederick Law Olmsted, the landscape architect of Mount Royal. The park was designed around existing natural streams, ravines and wooded areas.

Flowerbeds were planted and a bandstand was constructed. In 1964, the park was renovated by the firm McFadzean & Everly. Lawns were decorated, trees were cut and the stream that crosses the park was redeveloped.

== Features ==
Westmount Conservatory and Greenhouses

The park has a playground, flower beds, two soccer fields, a Canadian football field, and several tennis courts (both hardcourts and clay courts). A stream winds through the middle of the park and is lined by trees and benches. The park has been home field to the Westmount Rugby Club for nearly 50 years.

The Westmount Arena and municipal pool are located in the southwest corner of the park, while the Westmount Public Library and Victoria Hall are located in the northwest corner.

The park also seasonally features a large floral clock, installed in 1926, measuring six meters in diameter and composed of more than 7,000 ornamental plants.

== Gallery ==
Soccer and rugby field at east side

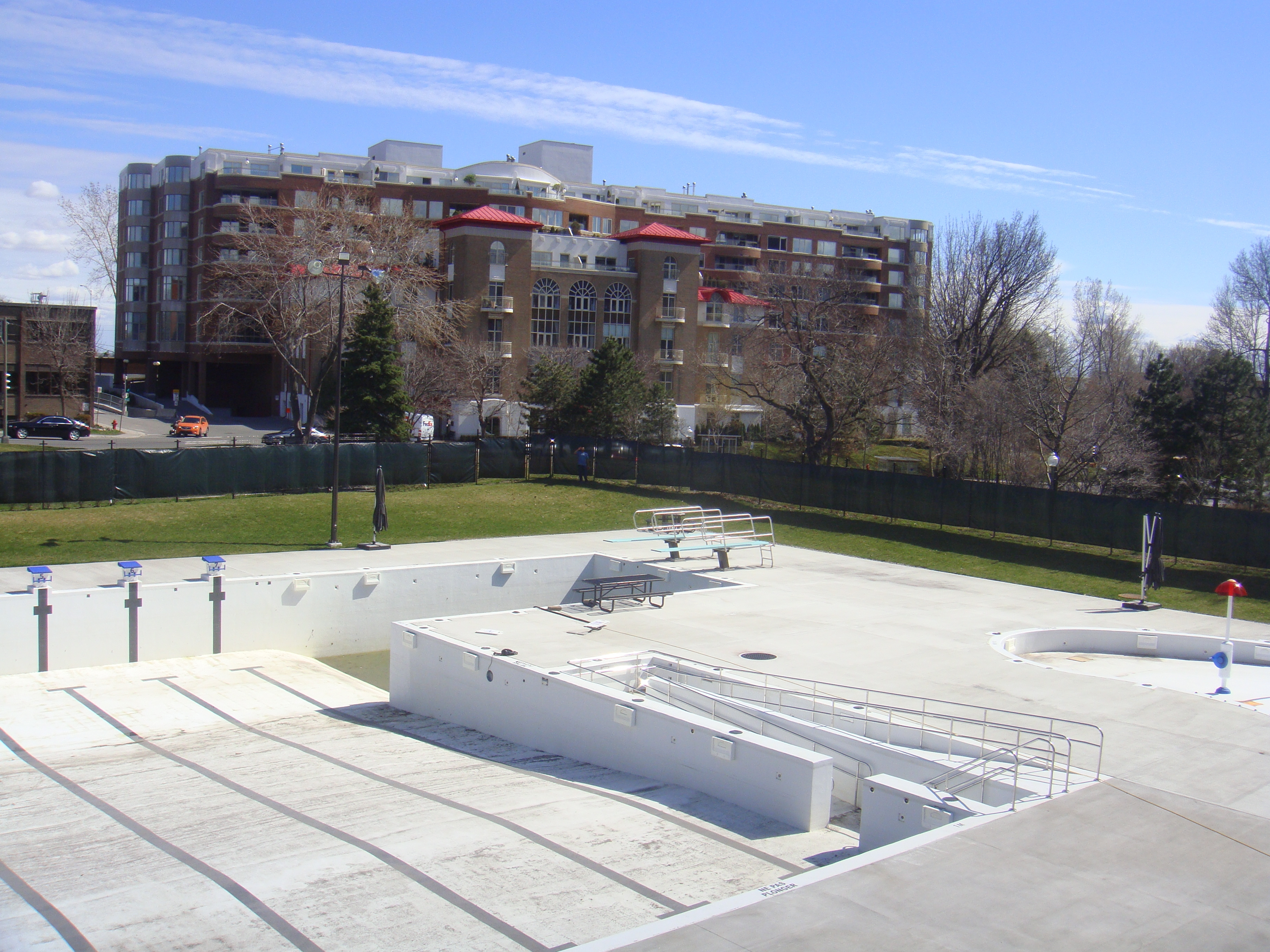
Swimming pool

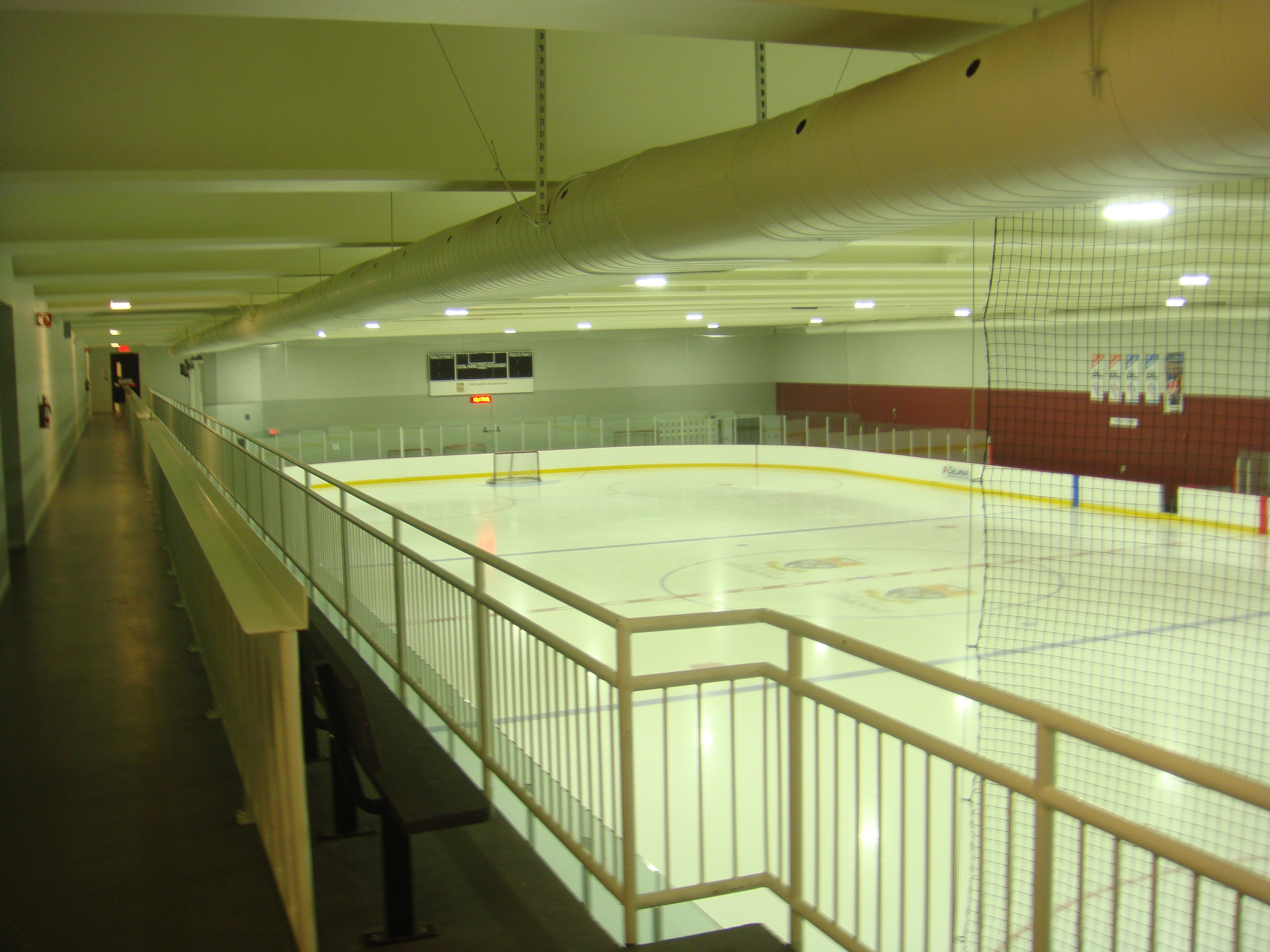
One of two underground hockey rinks

Children Play Area
