= Mary Sollace Saxe =

Canadian librarian and author (1868–1942)

Mary Sollace Saxe (February 23, 1868 – May 27, 1942) was a Canadian librarian and author. She is best known for her work with the children's room at the Westmount Public Library and her published book, Our Little Quebec Cousin (1919).

== Biography ==
Mary Sollace Saxe was born in St. Albans, Vermont, on February 23, 1868. Called “Mollie” by her family, she was born to James Saxe and Sarah Storrs-Solace Saxe. She was the sixth of their seven children. While she was still a child, her family moved to Montreal, Canada. This relocation to a French-speaking area would have an impact on her later literary works. During her youth, she received a private education in Montreal, and went on to study journalism at McGill University in Montreal and Columbia University in New York. Later in her life, she would take librarianship at the New York Public Library School in 1929. In 1901, Saxe began her 30-year career as Chief Librarian at the Westmount Public Library. In this position, she would pioneer changes in library policy that would be adopted in libraries throughout Canada and the United States. During this time, she would also write a number of books for young readers and columns for the Montreal Gazette, Bulletin of the American Library Association, Canadian Bookman, Ontario Library Review, and The Vermonter. Saxe remained in Montreal the rest of her life and died on May 27, 1942, at the age of 77. She was cremated and interred in her family's plot in Greenwood Cemetery, St. Albans, Vermont.

== Career ==
Saxe was the first librarian hired to run the Westmount Public Library and served from 1900-1930. In 1904, she became an author as well when she published her first article, “Westmount Public Libraries”. 1911, she opened a children's room to encourage children to read because she believed that children needed a dedicated space in the library. The room was designed with tiles depicting Alice in Wonderland scenes. In 1914, Saxe also oversaw the project to create a Reference Room in the Westmount Public Library. In 1917, Saxe introduced an open-shelf system to the library. In 1919, Mary Sollace Saxe wrote and published her most popular book, Our Little Quebec Cousin. It was a children's novel about a little French girl living in Quebec. In 1926, Saxe connected the library with a conservatory known as the Palm Room. She spoke at numerous conferences for librarians and wrote multiple books and articles. She retired in 1931. After retirement, she wrote a few one-act plays. Her plays, “All is Discovered,” “Just a Tip,” and “Rainbows”, were performed theatrically.

== Impact on library policy ==
Saxe's tenure at the Westmount Public Library resulted in policy changes that would become standard procedure for libraries across Canada and the United States. Most notably, she implemented the open shelf system, which allowed patrons to browse the library collection and access books without having to request them. She also advocated for thorough training and education for library staff. Additionally, she oversaw the opening of the library's Children's Room in 1911, and the Reference Room in 1914, expanding library services to meet the needs of a diverse patronage. She strongly believed that Canadians should support Canadian authors and be proud of them, so she encouraged patrons to read Canadian books to their children.

== Published works ==
- Saxe, Mary S. (1904). "Westmount Public Library". Public Libraries; A Monthly Review of Library Matters and Methods 9, no. 5: 209.
- Saxe, Mary S. (1910). "Popularizing the Library". Library Journal 35, no. 8: 363-66.
- Saxe, Mary S. (1911). "Classification Of Books". Proceedings of the Ontario Library Association Annual Meeting: 59-64.
- Saxe, Mary S. (1912). "With The Children in Canada". Library Journal 37, no. 8: 433-35.
- Saxe, Mary S. (1915). "The Canadian Library's Opportunities to Encourage the Reading of Canadian Authors". Proceedings of the Ontario Library Association Annual Meeting: 48-52.
- Saxe, Mary S. (1916). "One Hundred Years Ago - Relatively Speaking". American Library Association Bulletin 10, no. 4: 299-301.
- Saxe, Mary S. (1917). "What seems to me an important aspect of the work of public libraries at the present time". Proceedings of the Ontario Library Association Annual Meeting: 35-37.
- Saxe, Mary S. (1919). "Books and their classification". Canadian Bookman 1, no 3 (July): 56-58.
- Saxe, Mary S. (1919). Our Little Quebec Cousin. Boston: L.C. Page.
- Saxe, Mary S. (1920). "The Library from the inside, out!" Canadian Bookman 2, no. 2 (April): 16-17.
- Saxe, Mary S. (1920). "What is the most important aspect of public library work?" Canadian Bookman 2, no. 4 (Dec.): 90-91.
- Saxe, Mary S. Saxe (1927). "Libraries of east Canadian provinces". Library Journal 52, no. 10: 525-26.

== Associations and positions ==
- American Library Association (ALA)-member
- Canadian Authors Association-member
- Montreal Art Association-member
- Business and Professional Women's Club-member
- Canadian Women's Club-member
- Quebec Library Association-member
- Dickens Fellowship-vice president
- Women's Art Society of Montreal-vice president
