= Westmount Rugby Club =

Canadian rugby union club, based in Westmount, Quebec

(Canada) Westmount
- Full name: Westmount Rugby Football Club
- Union: Rugby Quebec
- Nickname: Ravens
- Founded: 1876; 150 years ago
- Region: Downtown Montreal
- Ground(s): Westmount Park, Westmount, Quebec
- President: Geemal Sevathean
- Coach(es): Liam Pantis (Men's) Ricky Bray , Mimi Simmons , Tiffany Luong (Women's)
- League: Fédération de Rugby du Québec
- 2015: Two Men's teams, One Women's and juniors
Team kit

Official website
- westmountrugby.com

The Westmount Rugby Football Club is a Canadian rugby club based in Westmount, Quebec, Canada.

Despite McGill University having a team in 1874, Westmount, which claims to have been established in 1876, is the oldest independent (as opposed to college-affiliated) rugby club in North America. Under the title of Montreal Football Club, the club played its matches at the McGill University grounds. The club gathered for social matches and occasions, and never really grew in size until it associated itself with the newly founded Montreal Amateur Athletic Association – which was to become the premier sporting club at the turn of the century and figure prominently in the development of rugby in Montreal, Quebec, and ultimately Canada.

The Montreal Amateur Athletic Association came into existence June 1881 and began as a confederation of three sporting clubs: the Montreal Snow Shoe Club, the Montreal Bicycle Club, and the Montreal Lacrosse Club. These founding clubs shared the club space of the Montreal Gymnasium, located at Mansfield Street and De Maisonneuve Boulevard. In 1884, the Montreal (Rugby) Football Club had upwards of 170 active members, and its first XV achieved an undefeated season, playing clubs from Royal Military College (Kingston), Ottawa, Quebec City, Toronto, British of New York, McGill University, and Bishop's University (Lennoxville, Quebec). The Montreal (Rugby) Football Club had used the McGill University grounds and the nearby Montreal Amateur Athletic Association facility as clubroom, even though it was not formally associated with the Association until 1885.

Also in 1884, the Montreal (Rugby) Football club was instrumental in the formation of the Canadian Rugby Union. Three representatives from the Montreal Club were sent to meet with two representatives from the Toronto Rugby Football Club, and one from the Hamilton Rugby Football Club to meetings in Toronto and Montreal. It was decided that the union would continue to use the English rugby rules, and at the end of the season the winning club of the Quebec Championship would play the Ontario Champion for the Club Championship of the Dominion.

With the amalgamation of the Montreal (Rugby) Football Club into the Montreal Amateur Athletic Association in 1885, the club's grounds were shared with the Montreal Lacrosse Club in the city block downtown bound by Crescent Street, Sherbrooke Street, Bishop Street, and De Maisonneuve Boulevard. Matches were held at this ground only until 1888, when the Montreal Amateur Athletic Association moved its clubhouse to the Westmount Athletic Grounds at the junction of Saint Catherine Street and Hallowell Avenue, due to urban expansion into the downtown pitch and the subsequent dividing of the property into building lots. The Westmount property was landscaped and the Montreal Amateur Athletic Association laid down a cinder track, fences, six hundred yards of drainage, uprights, a pavilion, and a clubhouse. The pitch was, by today's standards larger than an international size rugby pitch. These grounds, aside from playing host to Montreal's rugby and lacrosse matches, also played host to Montreal's most popular sporting events such as bicycle races, athletics, ice hockey in winter, and in 1897 hosted the Jubilee Celebration of Queen Victoria's reign.

At the turn of the century a new quarters was needed to accommodate a rapidly growing membership. In 1905, the Montreal Amateur Athletic Association clubhouse moved to Peel Street (where it currently resides), and the Westmount Athletic Grounds was retained as the club's official athletic grounds until July 1936. The economic depression inflicted severe financial problems upon the Montreal Amateur Athletic Association, and the property was therefore sold to the City of Westmount to help alleviate the economic hardships. In the meantime, rugby football had begun to make its split in North America. Between 1910 and 1920, American-style football gained in popularity; so popular that games were now played in front of larger capacities, and the football club soon split from the Montreal Amateur Athletic Association to form a semi-professional club. Rugby continued at the Westmount Athletic Grounds until 1959, when the Athletic facility was demolished to make way for Westmount High School, and a baseball diamond was built in the middle of the pitch rendering it unsuitable for rugby.

Since its split from the Montreal Amateur Athletic Association in the 1930s, the Rugby Football Club kept its colours of blue and white, but adopted the new name of The Montreal Scottish RFC, owing to its strong Scottish influence within the Montreal Amateur Athletic Association. For years, the Montreal Scottish RFC were the premier rugby club of Quebec, winning almost everything they could possibly arrange to compete for.

By the 1950s, the Montreal Scottish RFC could not accommodate the vast number of players wishing to join the club, and they took on a “Scottish-only” policy by turning away many non-Scottish players. These “exiled” players eventually formed local clubs: the Montreal Wanderers RFC and the Montreal Barbarians Rugby Club. Soon after, noting that this “Scottish-only” policy was not sustainable, the club policy became open to all players of all backgrounds, and the club name changed to the Westmount Rugby Football Club, named after the municipality where its home field had been located for most of its history.

With the demolition of The Westmount Athletic Grounds, the club moved its grounds to the nearby Villa Maria High School, before settling at Westmount Park located in the heart of the city of Westmount. By 1976, the Quebec Rugby Union had grown to six clubs (Ormstown RFC, Montreal Irish RFC, Montreal Wanderers RFC, Montreal Barbarians RC, Town of Mount Royal RFC and Westmount RFC), and Westmount RFC had changed its colours to maroon and white. Also adopted was the raven as a club symbol, owing from the municipal crest of the city of Westmount, where it figures prominently. The club became officially incorporated in 1976.

The club wore maroon jerseys with white shorts until 1997, when it was decided to incorporate black into the uniform. Black shorts were introduced for 'exhibition matches' and the club began to use them regularly afterwards.

== The Founding of Rugby Quebec ==
The Westmount Rugby Football Club was one of the founding clubs of Rugby Quebec. Other founding clubs included Montreal Irish Rugby Football Club, Barbarians, Montreal Wanderers RFC and Town of Mount Royal (TMR). Every one of these clubs continues to this day, fielding teams across the divisions of the league.

== Current team ==
The club continues to play in Division One of the Rugby Quebec, having won the Division C championship in 2011. Its home field is Westmount Park. The team currently has two competitive men's teams, one social men's team, one women's competitive/social team, a juniors program and a minis program.

In 2016 the women's team had an undefeated season and won the Development Division Championship. In 2017 they were promoted to the next higher division.

Up to 2017 Westmount and Montreal Wanderers RFC fielded a joint women's team, called the Wandering Ravens, but at the end of the season "(the Wanderers) experienced a somewhat abrupt and disheartening split from its long running affiliation with the Westmount Ravens."

== Recent seasons ==
=== Men's first team ===
Season	Division	W	L	T	PF	PA	TF	TA	Pts	Finish	Result
2017	Second	8	1	1	246	141	34	19	38	2nd	
+	Cup	1	0	1	32	35	-	-	-	-	runner up
2018	Second	6	1	3	354	165	46	24	35	2nd	
+	Cup	0	0	1	9	10	-	-	-	-	
2019	Second	8	1	1	359	153	49	19	39	2nd	
+	Cup	1	0	1	29	33	-	-	-	-	runner up
2021	First	6	0	0	263	114	-	-	30	1st	League champs
2022	First	8	0	0	257	117	39	18	38	1st	League champs
+	Cup	1	0	1	24	10	-	-	-	-	runner up
2023	First & Second	2	0	8	144	282	19	44	10	7th	
2024	First	1	0	6	55	232	8	35	5	5th	
2025	First	1	0	9	130	438	21	66	7	6th	
2026	First	2	0	8	199	446	32	70	14	5th	

Note - league and cup competition was halted in 2020 and the cup was cancelled in 2021 due to covid.

=== Men's second team ===
Season	Division	W	L	T	PF	PA	TF	TA	Pts	Finish	Result
2017	Developmental	4	0	6	78	299	11	47	20	5th	
2018	Developmental	2	0	8	152	246	23	40	12	7th	
2019	Developmental	1	0	8	93	253	14	40	6	7th	
2021	no team	-	-	-	-	-	-	-	-	-	
2022	First Reserve	4	0	4	119	117	19	17	20	3rd	
+	Cup	0	0	1	3	14	-	-	-	-	
2023	First Reserve	1	0	9	128	322	22	48	8	8th	
2024	First Reserve	0	0	7	125	255	22	39	5	5th	
2025	First Reserve	0	0	10	-	-	-	-	-	-	no team/defaults
2026	First Reserve	2	0	8	115	385	13	41	12	5th	

Note - league and cup competition was halted in 2020 and the cup was cancelled in 2021 due to covid.

=== Women's team ===
Season	Division	W	L	T	PF	PA	TF	TA	Pts	Finish	Result
2017	First	5	0	5	213	217	36	34	28	5th	with Wanderers
+	Developmental (Team II)	5	0	5	137	225	24	37	22	5th	with Wanderers
2018	Developmental	2	0	8	99	326	16	48	10	10th	
2019	Developmental	6	0	2	234	129	38	23	29	2nd	
+	Cup	1	0	1	24	48	-	-	-	-	runner up
2021	no team	-	-	-	-	-	-	-	-	-	
2022	First	0	0	5	26	235	4	38	0	13th	
2023	Second	1	0	7	80	341	12	50	6	4th	
2024	Second	1	0	7	89	303	15	47	6	9th	
2025	Third	3	0	7	170	239	28	37	17	5th	
2026	Third	3	0	5	165	264	28	22	44	4th	
+	Cup	1	0	1	0	37	-	-	-	-	

Note - league and cup competition was halted in 2020 and the cup was cancelled in 2021 due to covid.
