= Montreal Wanderers RFC =

Canadian rugby union club, based in Montreal

(Canada) Montreal Wanderers
- Full name: Montreal Wanderers RFC
- Union: Rugby Quebec (FRQ)
- Founded: 1957; 69 years ago
- Location: Montreal, Quebec
- Ground(s): Douglas Hospital, Verdun
- Chairman: Matthew Kerr
- Coach: Alexandre Chanéac
- Captain: Elliot Goussanou
- League(s): FRQ, Provincial 2
1st kit	2nd kit

Official website
- montrealwanderers.ca

The Montreal Wanderers Rugby Football Club is a rugby union club based in Montreal, Quebec, Canada. It was founded in 1957, and is based on the grounds of the Douglas Hospital in Verdun.

== Establishment ==
The Montreal Wanderers Rugby Club was conceived in the Spring of 1957. The Barbarian F.C., the legendary invitation only all-star team from the UK, had just beaten a team of Quebec select players 41-3 in front of 5000 fans at Delorimier Stadium. Cliff Morgan, legendary fly half for the Barbarians, was reported to have told his Quebec hosts was that what Canada needed was more clubs. Present at that meeting were several members of the Montreal Scottish RFC (now known as Westmount Rugby Club).

Due to an influx of players, the Montreal Scottish had adopted a Scots-only policy in order to manage their numbers. This left many players from other rugby nations without a home, and Cliff Morgan's suggestion was just the prompting they needed. Players from the Montreal Scottish founded two new clubs; the Montreal Barbarians RFC and the Montreal Wanderers RFC.

The Wanderers played their first match against the Montreal Scottish in the Fall of 1957, and the first tour was held that Thanksgiving to Deep River, 200 km northwest of Ottawa.

Over the first few years of the club's existence, Wanderers' recruitment benefited from the Scots-only policy of the Montreal Scottish RFC. The Wanderers saw their ranks swell to three full squads, which continued through to the mid 60's. With the end of Expo 67, many southern hemisphere Wanderers left Montreal and returned home. The Wanderers dropped from three sides to two in 1968, where they remained until a brief thirds revival in 2006.

== The Founding of Rugby Quebec ==
The Montreal Wanderers were one of the founding clubs of Rugby Quebec (FRQ in French). Other founding clubs included Montreal Irish Rugby Football Club, Barbarians, Westmount Rugby Club and Town of Mount Royal (TMR). Every one of these clubs continues to this day, fielding teams across multiple levels of the FRQ league.

== Canadian National Team ==
The Montreal Wanderers are the club of origin for several members of the Canadian Senior Men's Team.

- Nik Witkowski received 33 caps for Canada, and was first capped against the USA on June 6, 1998. He scored a total of 37 tries for Canada between 1998 and 2006, and was part of the Canadian squad at the 2003 Rugby World Cup
- Colin Robertson was capped for both 7s and 15s, receiving his first cap at the Hong Kong 7s on May 24, 1997. He was capped a total of 7 times, scoring 3 tries before retiring from international rugby in 2001
- Keith Wilkinson was the 109th player to be capped for Canada, making his debut against the Barbarians on June 12, 1976. He played with the Wanderers in the early 70's before moving to work in the higher levels of the Rugby Canada administration.

== Present Day ==
The Wanderers currently field two teams in the FRQ men's league, competing against teams from Eastern Ontario and the rest of Quebec.

Up to 2017 the Wanderers and Westmount Rugby Club fielded a joint women's team, called the Wandering Ravens, but at the end of the season "experienced a somewhat abrupt and disheartening split from its long running affiliation with the Westmount Ravens."

In 2018 the women, in their inaugural season, finished with 9 wins and 1 loss, and lost a thrilling 40-37 semi-final match to Sainte-Anne de Bellevue in the League 2 cup competition.

== Recent seasons ==
=== Men's first team ===
Season	Division	W	L	T	PF	PA	TF	TA	Pts	Finish	Result
2017	Super	0	0	10	99	481	12	67	3	6th	
2018	First	0	0	10	167	352	25	49	5	6th	
2019	Second	7	1	2	443	162	67	17	39	1st	League champs
+	Cup	2	0	0	38	25	-	-	-	-	Cup champs
2021	First	1	0	5	132	228	-	-	5	4th	
2022	First	2	0	6	153	225	25	35	12	4th	
+	Cup	0	0	1	10	24	-	-	-	-	
2023	First & Second	7	0	3	277	208	45	31	34	4th	
+	Cup	1	0	1	58	51	-	-	-	-	runner up
2024	First	4	0	3	189	160	28	24	20	3rd	
+	Cup	0	0	1	15	24	-	-	-	-	
2025	First	9	0	1	400	199	66	19	45	2nd	
+	Cup	1	0	1	35	24	-	-	-	-	runner up
2026	First	7	1	2	353	183	53	27	37	2nd	
+	Cup	1	0	1	7	8	-	-	-	-	

Note - league and cup competition was halted in 2020 and the cup was cancelled in 2021 due to covid.

=== Men's second team ===
Season	Division	W	L	T	PF	PA	TF	TA	Pts	Finish	Result
2017	Super Reserve	2	0	8	146	354	22	60	11	5th	
2018	First Reserve	2	0	7	205	249	30	39	13	5th	
2019	Development I	8	0	1	227	125	35	21	39	1st	League champs
+	Cup	1	0	1	47	29	-	-	-	-	runner up
2021	Second	5	1	1	397	177	67	29	29	3rd	
2022	First Reserve	4	0	4	173	122	27	20	22	2nd	
+	Cup	1	0	1	30	20	-	-	-	-	runner up
2023	First Reserve & Third	6	0	4	273	221	44	34	30	4th	
+	Cup	0	0	1	22	23	-	-	-	-	runner up
2024	First Reserve	5	0	1	203	118	33	19	29	2nd	
+	Cup	1	0	1	43	46	-	-	-	-	runner up
2025	First Reserve	5	0	5	198	136	27	23	24	4th	
+	Cup	0	0	1	10	17	-	-	-	-	
2026	First Reserve	7	0	3	343	125	47	13	37	2nd	
+	Cup	1	0	1	45	43	-	-	-	-	runner up

Note - league and cup competition was halted in 2020 and the cup was cancelled in 2021 due to covid.

=== Women's team ===
Season	Division	W	L	T	PF	PA	TF	TA	Pts	Finish	Result
2017	First	5	0	5	213	217	36	34	28	5th	with Westmount
+	Developmental (Team II)	5	0	5	137	225	24	37	22	5th	with Westmount
2018	Second	9	0	1	295	129	47	22	44	2nd	
+	Cup	0	0	1	37	40	-	-	-	-	
2019	Second	8	0	2	366	131	59	23	41	2nd	
+	Cup	1	0	1		25	-	-	-	-	runner up
2021	no team	-	-	-	-	-	-	-	-	-	
2022	First	3	0	3	140	97	24	17	16	6th	
+	Cup	1	0	1	63	70	-	-	-	-	consolation runner up
2023	First	2	0	6	151	365	25	58	10	4th	
+	Cup	0	0	1	0	57	-	-	-	-	
2024	Second	4	2	2	284	137	47	21	27	5th	
2025	Second	8	0	2	376	141	60	22	41	2nd	
+	Cup	1	0	1	19	12	-	-	-	-	runner up
2026	First	5	0	5	194	271	25	41	23	3rd	
+	Cup	1	0	1	?	?	-	-	-	-	

Note - league and cup competition was halted in 2020 and the cup was cancelled in 2021 due to covid.
