= Westmount Public Library =

Public library in Westmount, Quebec

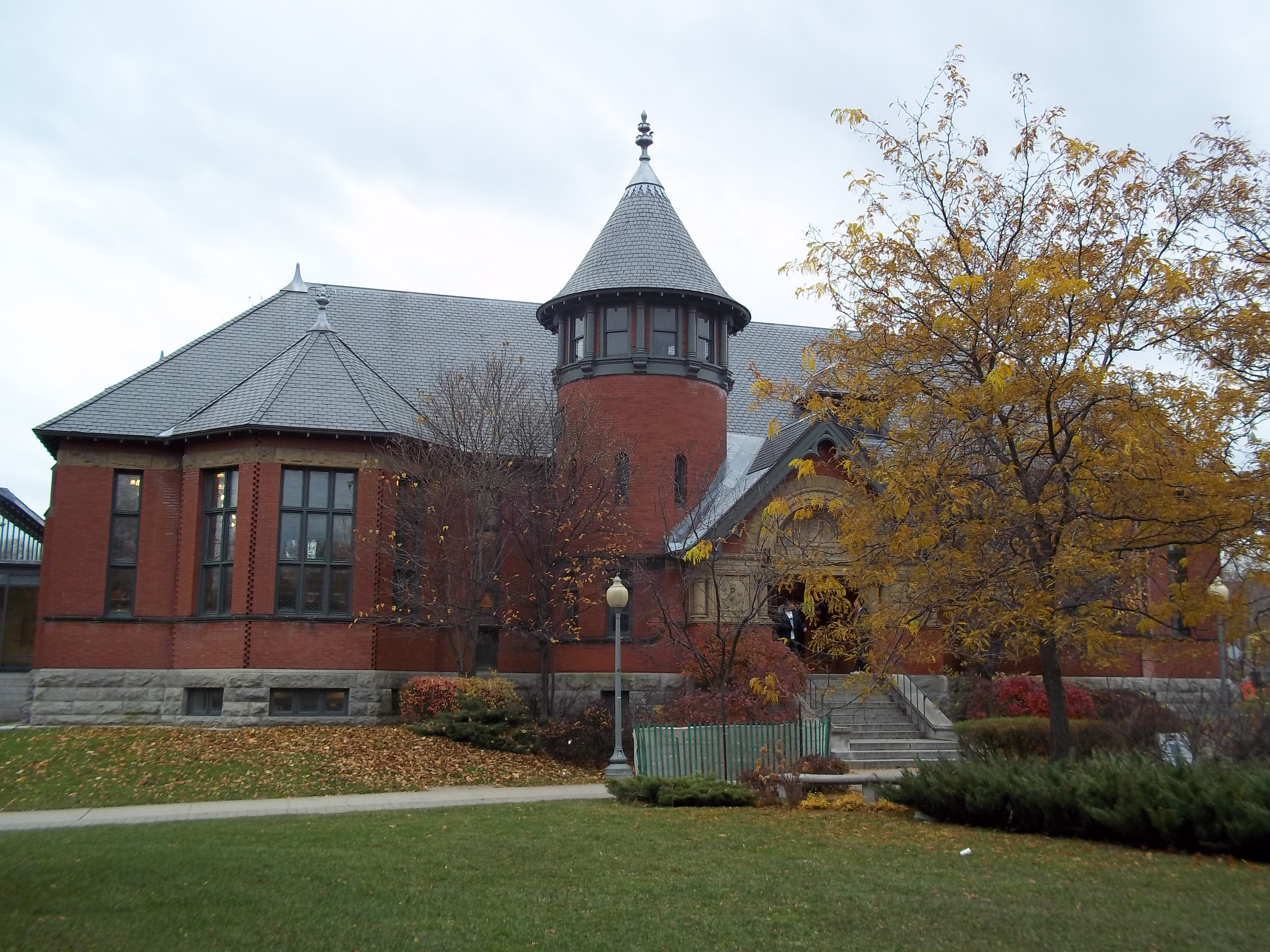
- Westmount Public Library in 2011
- Interactive map of the Westmount Public Library area

General information
- Location: 4574 Sherbrooke Street West, Westmount, Quebec, Canada
- Coordinates: 45.481183°N 73.599948°W
- Construction started: 1898
- Completed: 1899
- Opened: 1899
- Renovated: 1995
- Owner: City of Westmount

Height
- Architectural: Tudor Revival

Technical details
- Material: Sandstone
- Floor count: 3

Design and construction
- Architect: Robert Findlay

Other information
- Public transit: STM Bus: 24, 63, 90, 104, 138, 356

Westmount Public Library (French: Bibliothèque publique de Westmount) (WPL) is located at 4574 Sherbrooke Street West, Westmount, Quebec, Canada, in the northwest corner of Westmount Park. Designed by Robert Findlay, it opened in 1899, making it one of the oldest library buildings in Canada, and the oldest municipal library in Quebec.

== History ==
=== Founding to 1950 ===
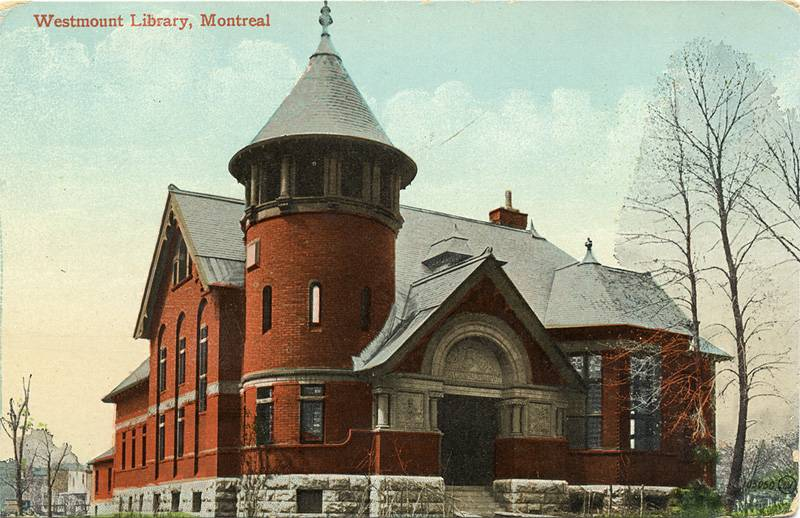
Westmount Public Library as it was in 1910

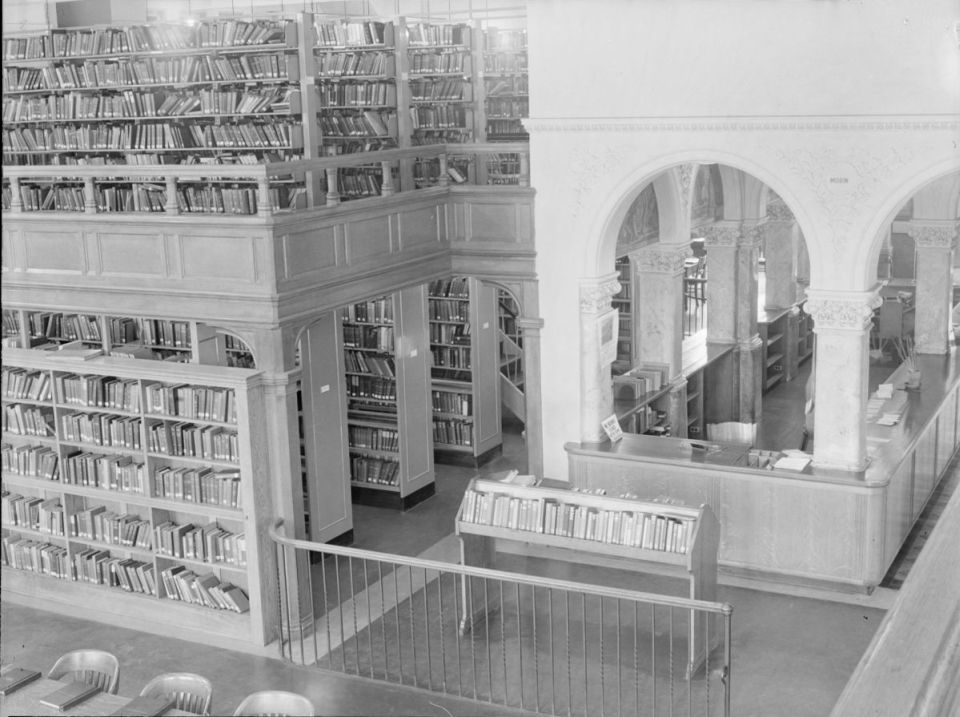
Westmount Public Library, 1938

The library was founded in 1897 to commemorate the Diamond Jubilee of then-reigning Queen Victoria. Robert Findlay was selected as the architect, and construction took place between 1898 and 1899. The total cost at that time was $16,375. This was for the books, furniture, and building itself. Findlay was inspired by the public libraries of New England he had visited. In this contribution, Findlay offered the City of Westmount a building with a vaulted entrance, a gabled roof, and a tower with turrets on the outside; and coffered ceilings, decorative moldings, strong arches, and faux marble columns on the inside.

Free Public Library and Reading Room … shall be forever free to the use of the inhabitants and ratepayers of the Town.

— By-law 82. 1897.

The Westmount Public Library was inaugurated on June 20, 1899, by Mayor James R. Walker. Its initial collection, assembled by McGill University Librarian Charles Henry Gould, numbered 2,000 books. Book lending began on July 23, 1899. Patrons could only borrow one book at a time, for a period of 14 days. The catalog originally had only 10 titles in French.

On June 20, 1898, the gala opening of the library took place. Records from that time indicate a collection of 1,992 books and 694 borrowers.

In 1909, the Library Committee suggested that an amount of C$20,000 be used for the creation of a space reserved for children, a reception room, and a reference service. At first, only the children's section was funded, while the referral service was considered to be of secondary importance. This changed in 1912 with the hiring of a librarian tasked with running this service. Given its popularity, it was integrated into the statutes and regulations of the library two years later. The success of both the children's section and the reference service became apparent. When it opened in 1911, the children's section was the source of 18.2% of all the books borrowed from the library; this share increased to 27.2% in 1914, the year the library inaugurated its youth reference service. The library had become, in the words of librarian Mary Sollace Saxe during a conference of the American Library Association, "the only properly equipped children's room in any library in the province of Quebec."

In 1940, members of the Active Service garrisoned in Westmount were given access to library services and the reading room. The library also took on the role of receiving station for magazine and book donations on the behalf of the Canadian Armed Forces.

The library experienced a sharp decline of book purchases in 1943. This was because of the low quality of paper and bindings. During that same year, the Library became the curator for the entirety of the collected material of the recently established Westmount Historical Association.

During the 1940s, the library replaced the alphabet system with the Dewey Decimal System and re-classified and re-cataloged its books.

For 5 weeks during 1946, the Children's Department was forced to close due to an outbreak of polio.

In 1948, two hundred guests were invited to celebrate the 50th anniversary of the library. The library's loan period was increased from 14 to 28 days.

=== 1950 to present ===
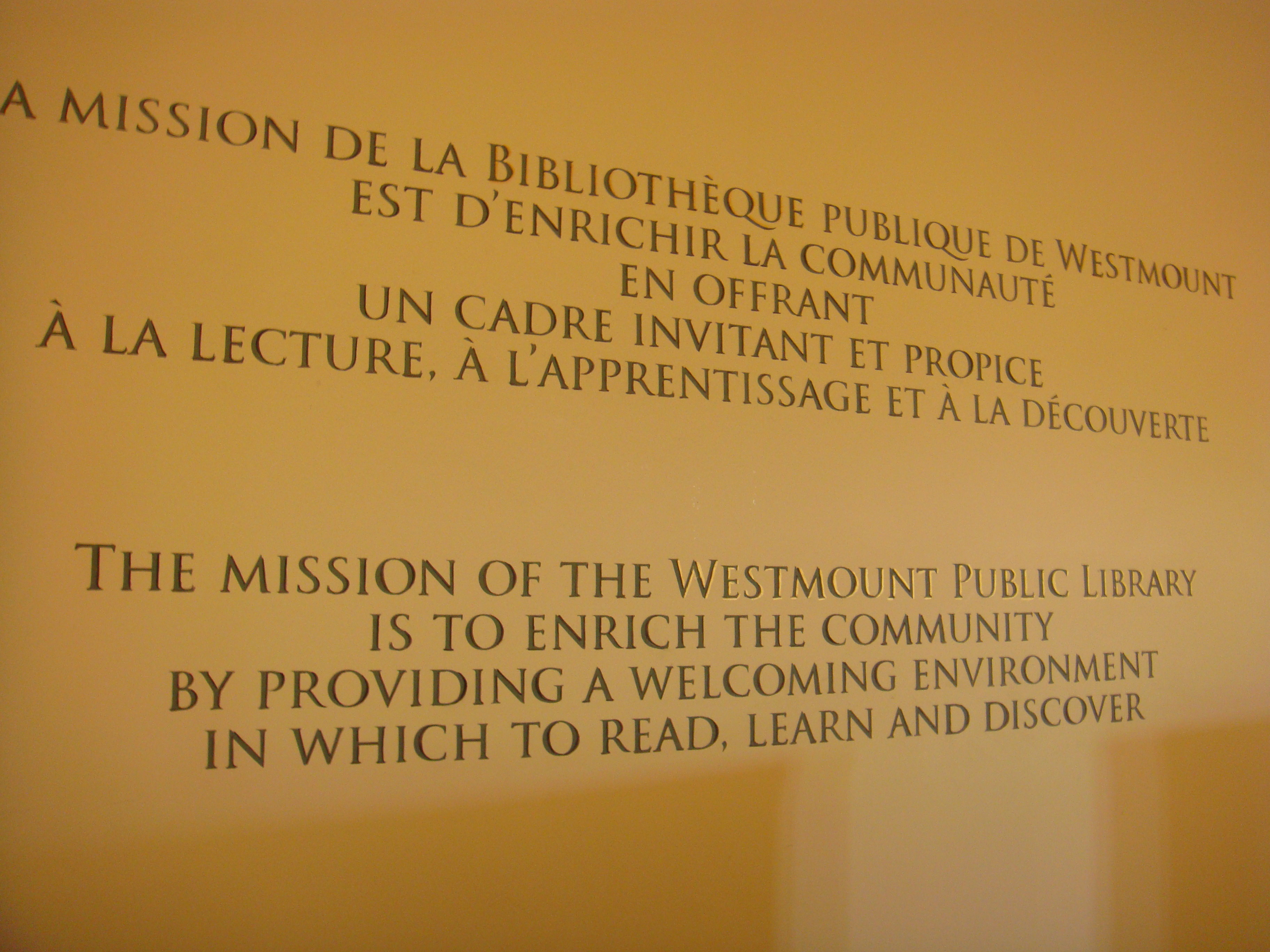
The mission statement of the library was adopted in 1997 and stenciled on the hallway a decade later.

In 1963, a depository was installed so that books could be returned even if the library was not opened. Student membership was introduced two years later. In 1968, the Children's Department began operating during the morning over the summer.

The library's collection exceeded the 100,000 mark in 1972.

In 1975, the library began adding cassette tapes to its collection and offering games in the Children's Department.

By-law 82 was revised in 1988. It thereafter stated that the "Trustees will be appointed by Council and all residents as well as property owners are eligible for appointment."

The 90th anniversary celebrations for the library were held in 1989.

In 1991, after a poll in which the citizens of Westmount approved a renewal and enlargement plan, extensive work was undertaken to renovate and modernize the library. Renovations commenced in 1994. During that time, the adult and reference collections were temporarily moved to 4225 Saint Catherine Street and the Children's Department, Audiovisual, Technical Services and Administration were located at Victoria Hall beside the library. The project was completed in 1995. The library's website came online the following year.

In 2000, an organization called the Friends of the Library was formed. One of its function is to host two quality used book sales a year inside Victoria Hall. Some of the used books being sold are donated by the community. Proceeds are used to finance the operations of the library. The sale is managed by volunteers, some of whom are students from local schools.

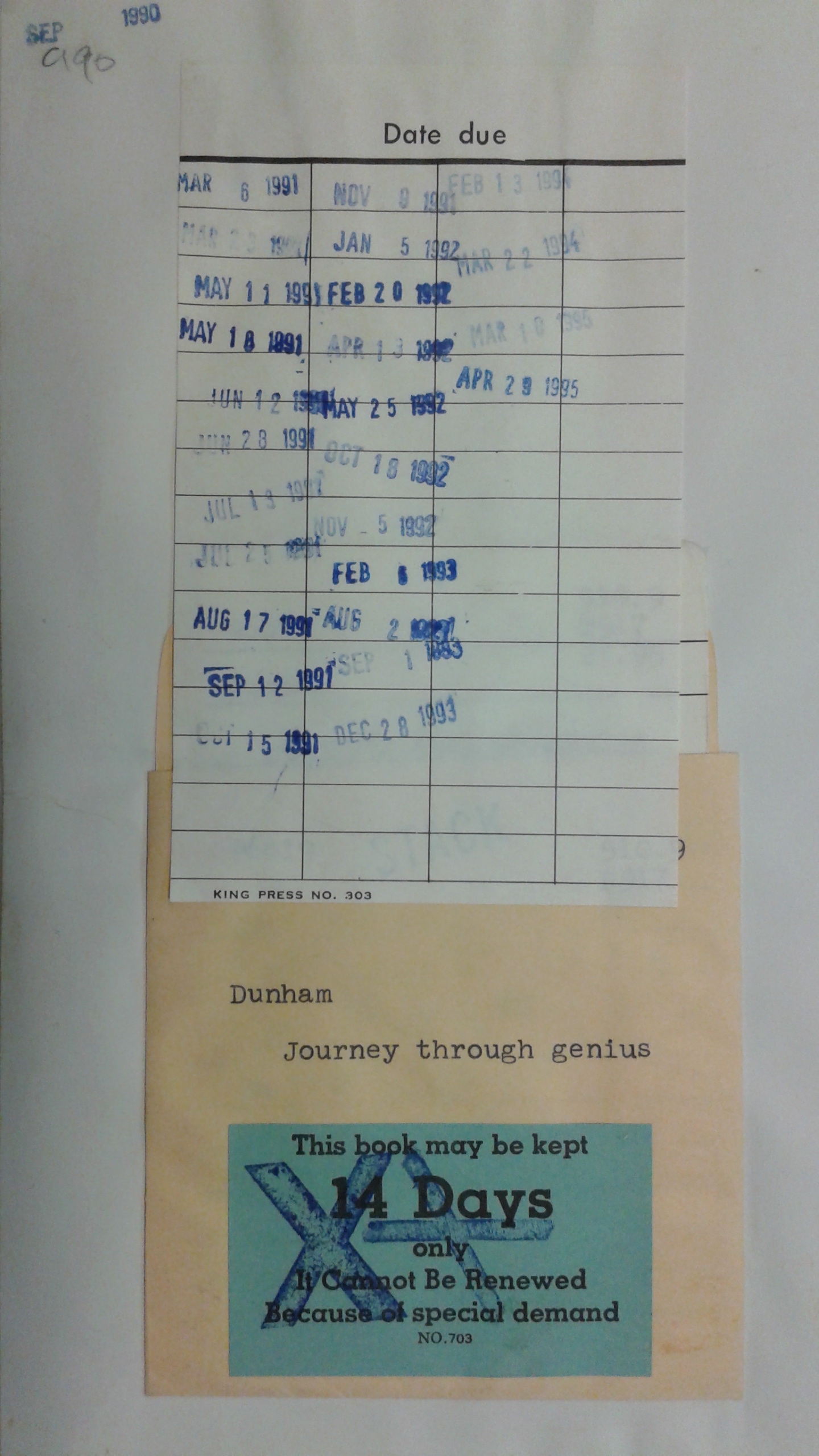
Date-due slip inside a book belonging to the Westmount Public Library. The book in question is Journey Through Genius (1990) by William Dunham

In 2003, the library's circulation passed the 450,000 mark with an average of 38 items per member.

Since 2014, the library has been hosting honeybee hives. This program is financially self-sustaining thanks to honey sales.

As of 2017, the library welcomes more than a thousand people daily and organizes its activities around 7,600 subscribers out of a population of 20,000 citizens. Its collection has been appended by a large collection of old and rare books in French and English, 80 donated works of art, and 40,000 old postcards reflecting the past of not just Westmount, but also of Montreal and Quebec.

As of the 2020s, the library offers numerous programs aimed at young children, teenagers, and young adults, including the TD Summer Reading Club, the Creative Writing Competition, and an annual Halloween celebration. By 2022, the library has a total of 168,896 printed books, 7,018 digital books, and 11,924 audiovisual items in its collection. Total loans of physical items were 235,016 and 6,182 people were card-carrying patrons. According to library director Anne-Marie Lacombe, around a thousand people visit the library on a daily basis. In 2023, the library officially eliminated fines for late returns, citing prior experience and research that these did not reduce the number of items returned after the deadline. Instead, the patron's account will be disabled after seven days. To reactivate it, the patron must either return the item or pay a replacement fee. Items not returned after 31 days are automatically considered lost. This new policy puts the Westmount Public Library in league with many others across North America.

On February 20, 2024, the library launched its smartphone application. Compatible with Android and iOS, this program enables users to reserve books, search a "light" version of the catalogue, renew loans, receive notifications, and carry an electronic membership card. The library organized various events throughout the year to celebrate its 125th anniversary, culminating in a party inside the library itself on November 23. For its 125th anniversary campaign, the Westmount Public Library received the John Cotton Dana Award for its promotion of library services to the public and cheque worth US$10,000 from the American Library Association, the first in Canada and one of only eight in North America.

In March 2026, the City of Westmount decided to temporarily close the library after bed bugs were found in places beyond the adult computers' section. However, electronic resources remained available. The adjacent Heritage Greenhouses and Victoria Hall were not affected. The library reopened in early April, following treatment and inspection by specialists. The entire building was cleaned, ventilation systems upgraded, and some pieces of furniture removed or replaced.

== Building and facilities improvements ==
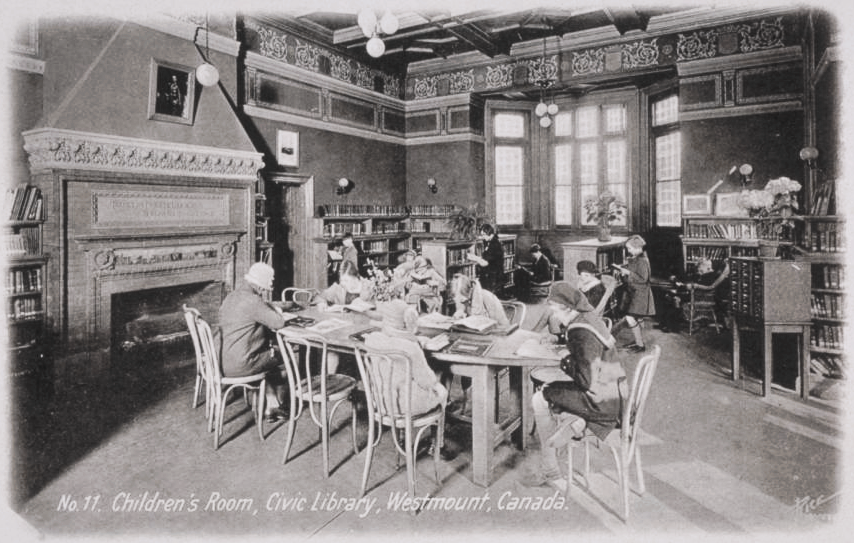
The Children's Reading Room (c. 1911)

In 1911, the Children's Department was opened. Findlay, the architect, designed the extension. It included a workroom as well as a basement book receiving room.

In 1914, over 500 books were sent to England to be rebound. Another 90 were repaired at McGill University. The Library stacks became available to the public in 1917. An inter-library loan network was set up in 1979 connecting 15 other public libraries in Montreal.

In 1915, the Library Committee announced major changes to the facilities allowing easier circulation between the shelves were needed in order to offer universal access to the general public. Robert Findlay was then recruited to devise the necessary changes. These were completed in the spring of 1917, when the Westmount Public Library started offering users unrestricted access to its shelves.

In 1925, architect Findlay along with his son designed an addition to the library. It included more stack space, another reading room, as well as an office for the librarians. This new wing also contained a mezzanine floor, the art section and music section, and reference books.

Modernization and remodeling was finished in 1936. This involved the creation of a new workroom, the installation of concrete floors, new counters for book borrowers, and an air-conditioning system.

1959 saw major changes including the installation of new steel stacks able to contain nearly 100,000 items, a new shipping area, and a new Children's Department. The former Children's Department was turned into offices, and the staff workroom was increased in size two-fold.

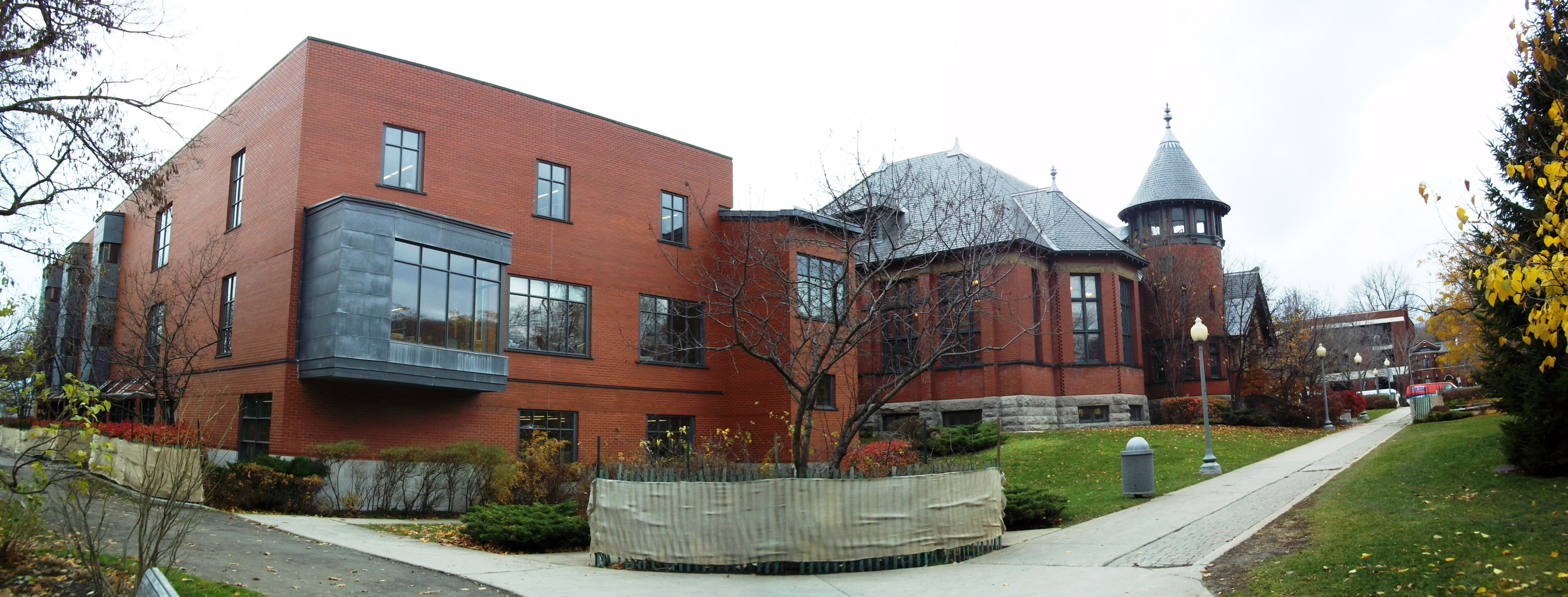
View from the southeast showing the building's extension

The Centennial Reference Room opened in 1967 and the entire library was carpeted to help reduce noise.

In 1972, Harry Mayerovitch designed new display facilities. That same year, the collection exceeded 100,000 items.

In 1981, an elevator was installed as well as a wheelchair-accessible washroom.

In 1984, the library acquired its first electronic computer, an IBM PC used as an upgrade to the automated cataloguing system. A videocassette collection was established for the first time in 1985. In 1994, the Westmount Public Library became the first in Quebec to gain access to the Internet. In 1999, the library's computers were updated to avoid the Y2K bug.

A section for adolescents was opened in 2013.

In 2023, the library relocated its adult audiovisual collection located on the ground floor to the third floor in order to free up space for a new accessible entrance facing the Westmount Park and a makerspace workshop called "the Studio"—featuring facilities for group work and other activities involving high technology, such as computer coding, robotics, and three-dimensional printing. The Studio and the new entrance officially opened on October 18, 2024.

== Staff ==
In 1898, Miss Beatrice Glen Moore was hired to be the first librarian. Her salary started at $520 per year. Two years later, in 1900, another librarian was hired by the name of Ms. Mary Solace Saxe. She retired 30 years later in 1930 and a new Chief Librarian was hired named Kathleen Jenkins. In 1962, Mrs. Norah Bryant was selected as Chief Librarian. Rosemary Lydon became Chief Librarian in 1982. In 1990, six new staff positions were created.

== Gallery ==
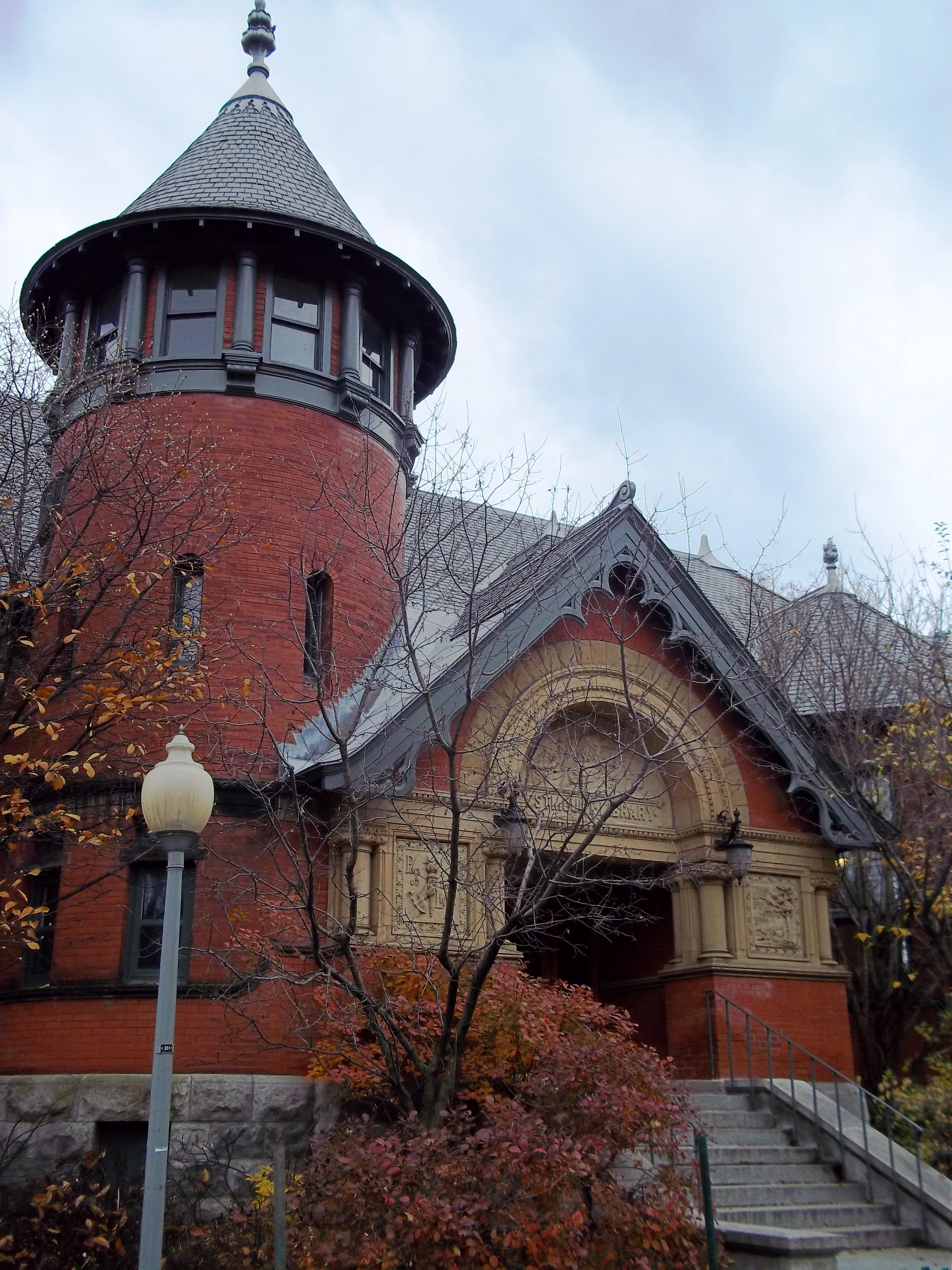
Eastern entrance, facing the Westmount Park

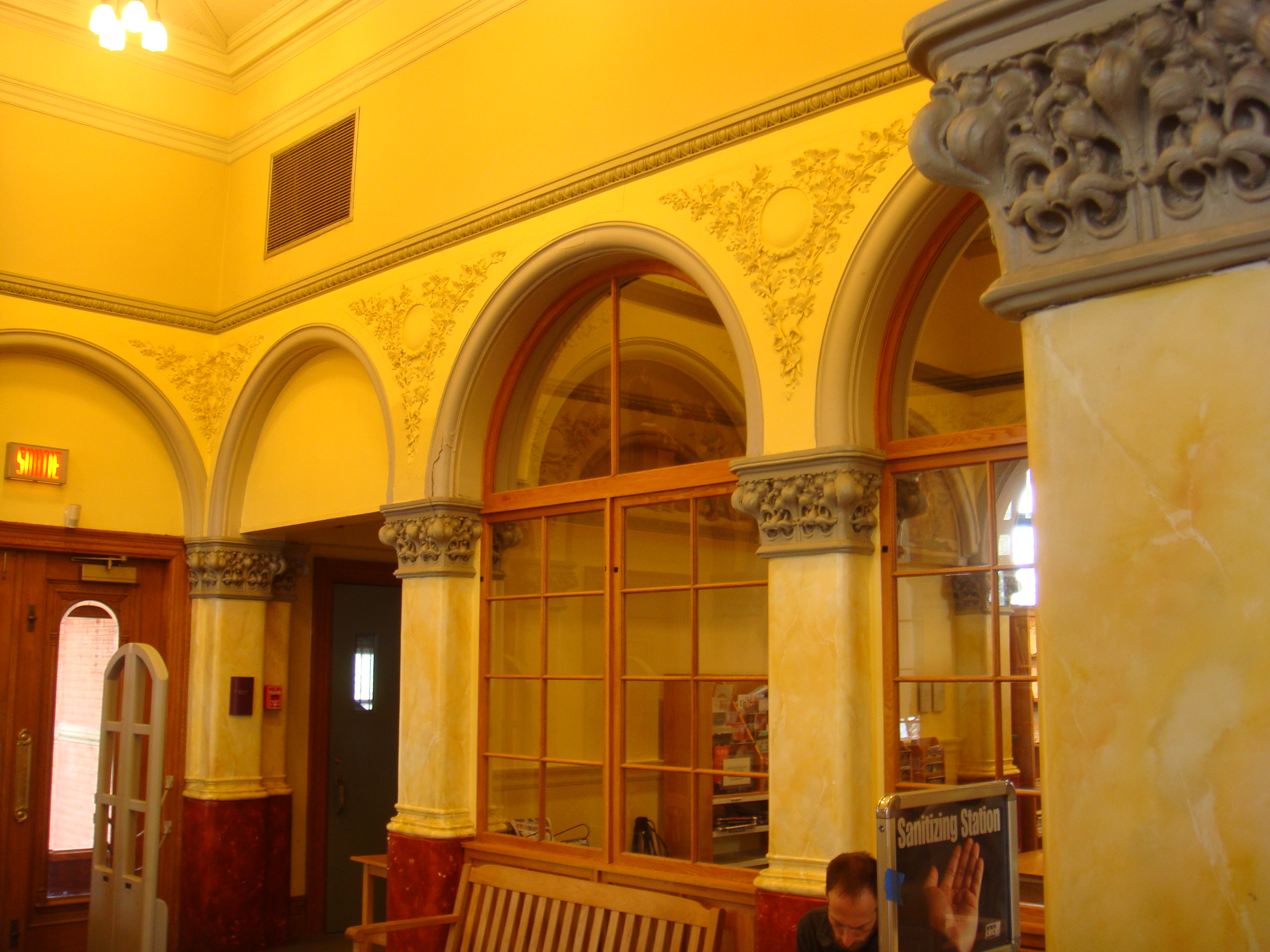
Interior of the second floor

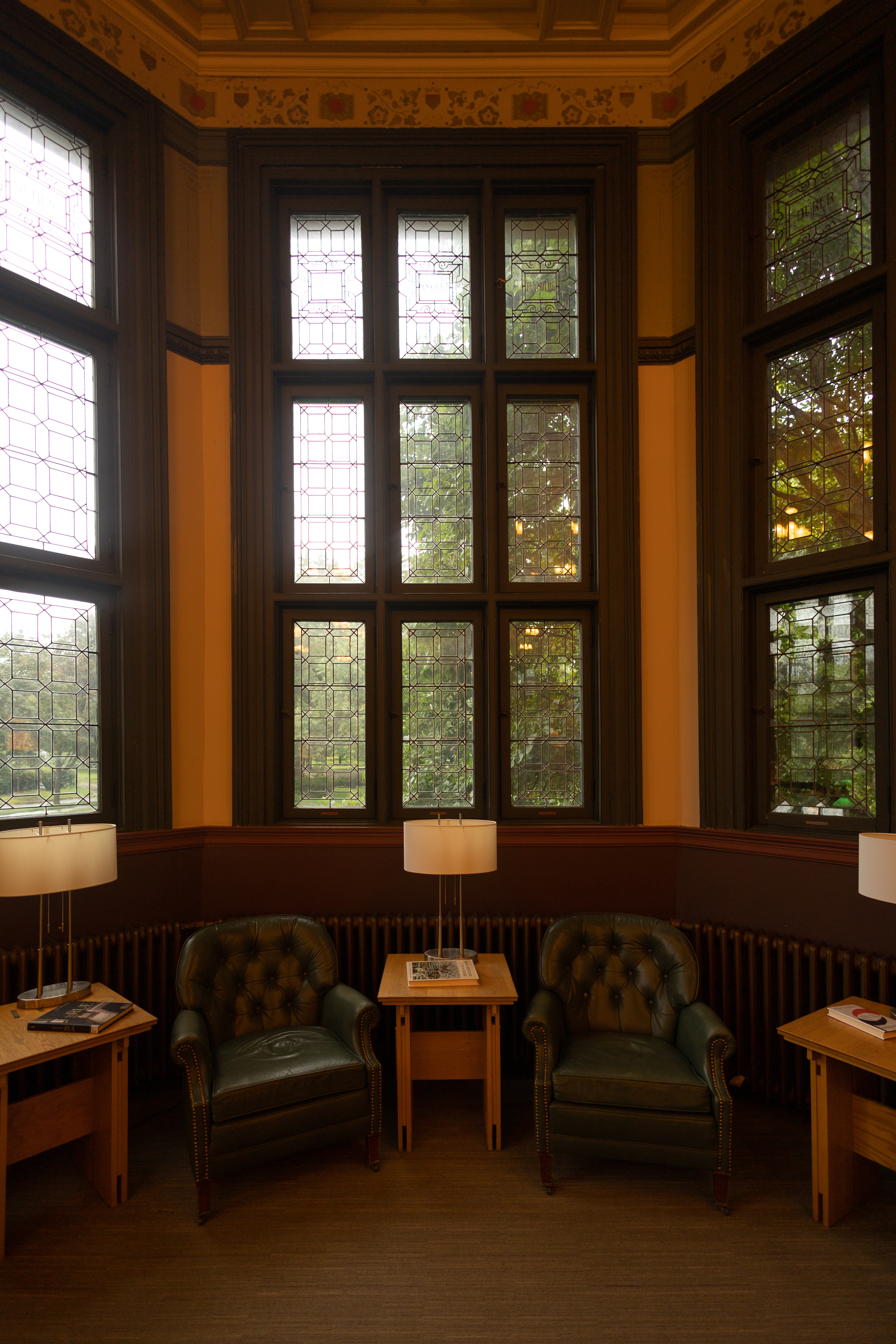
Some single-seated sofas on the second floor

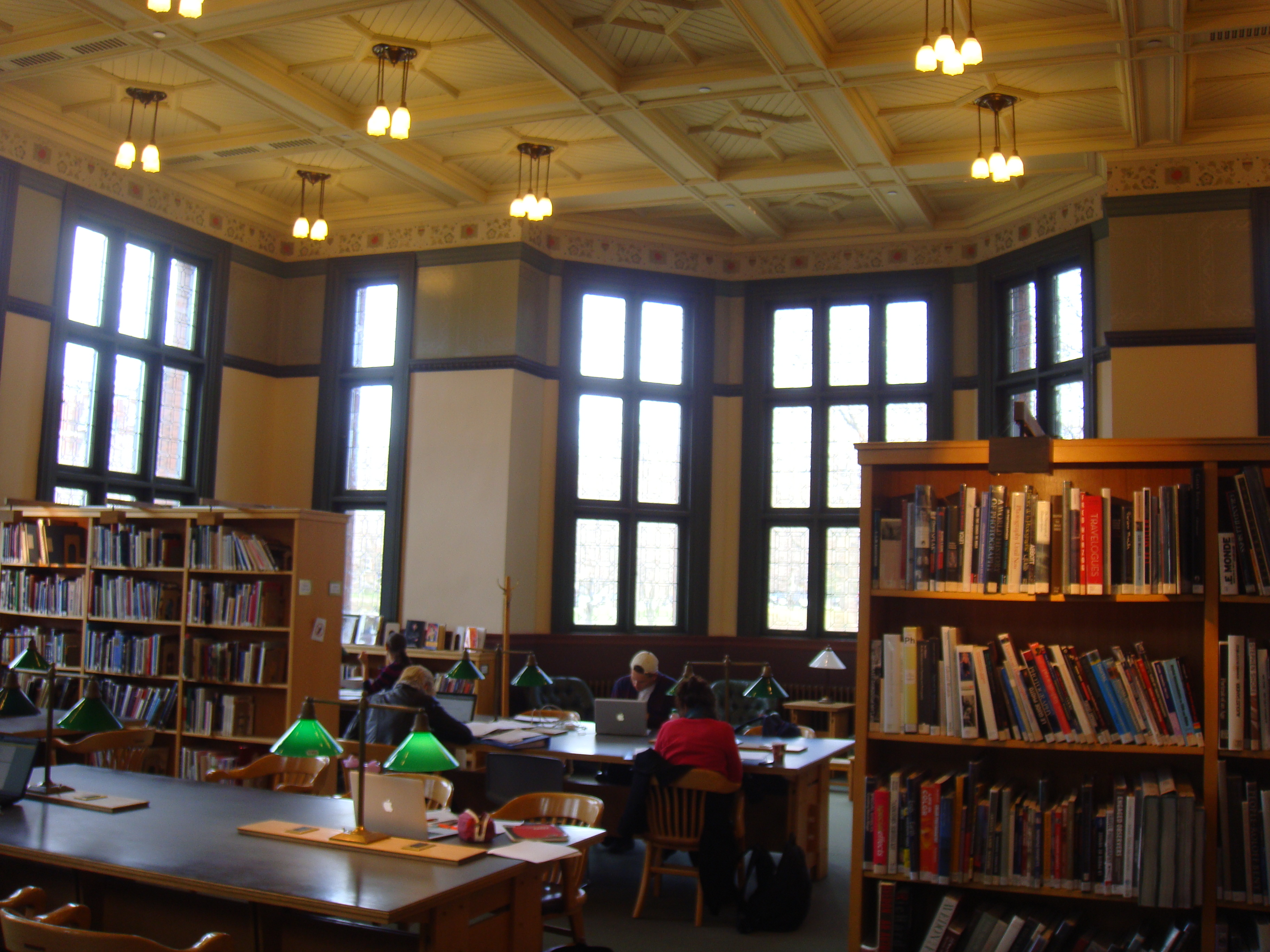
One of the main reading rooms on the second floor

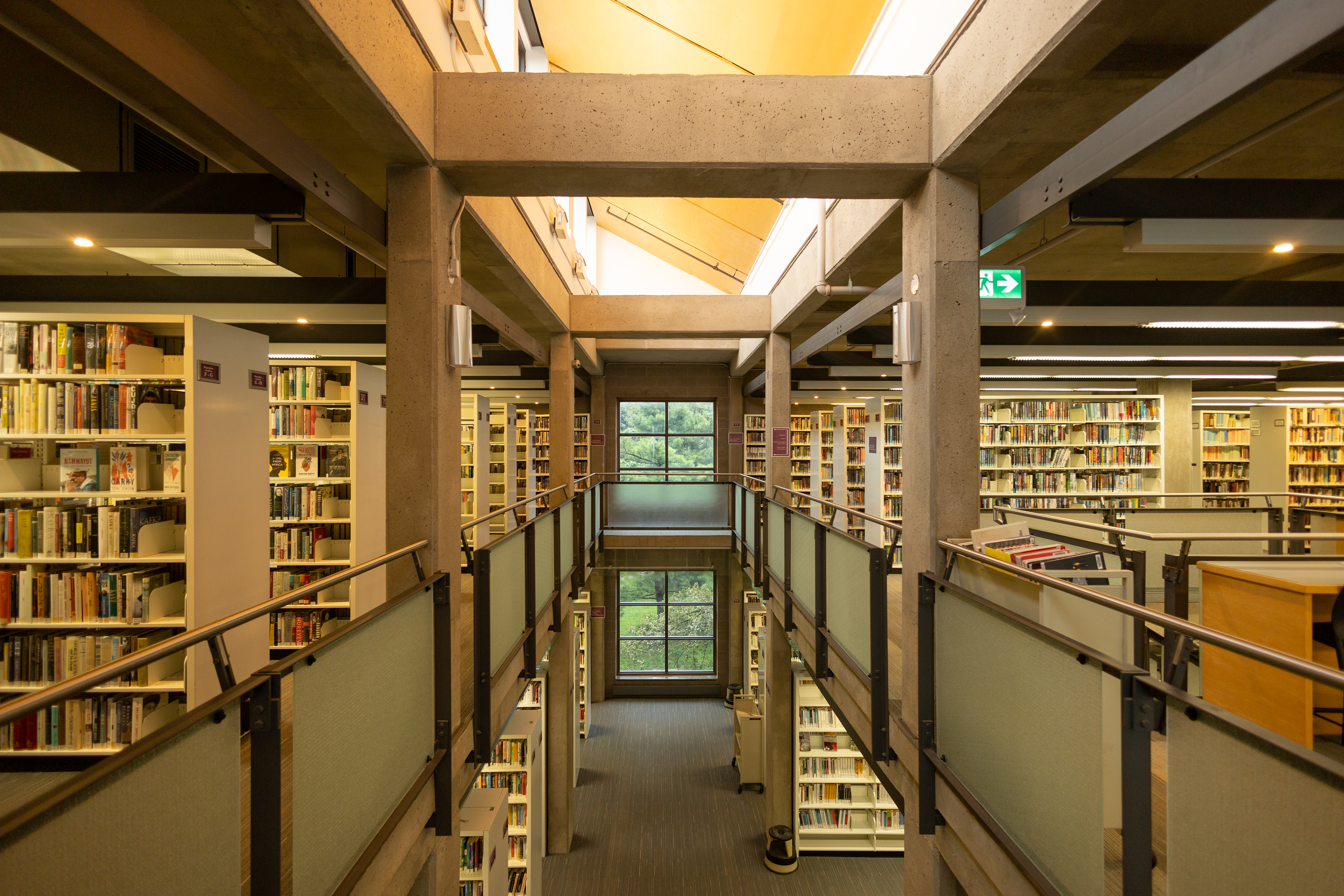
View from the third floor

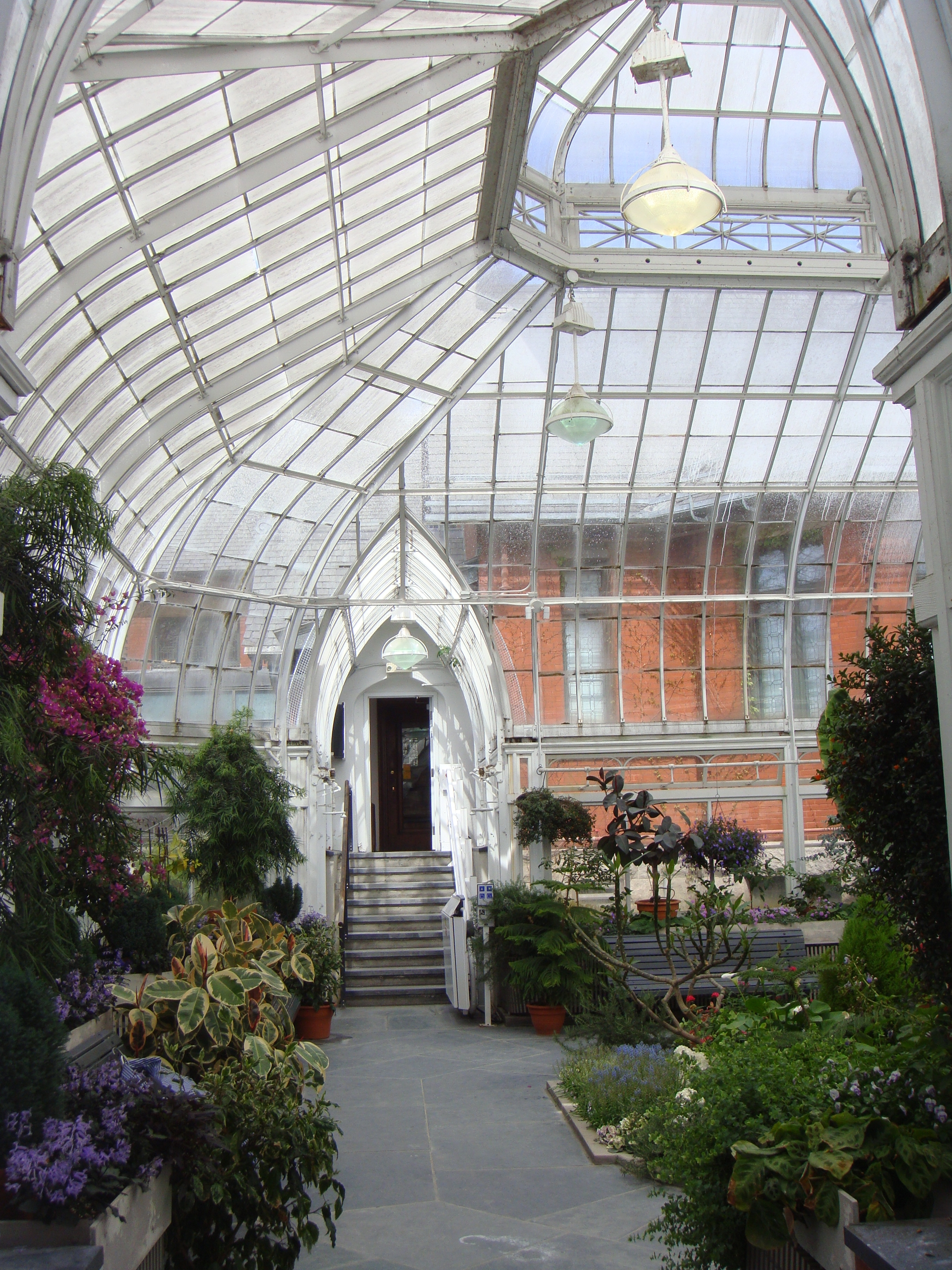
Westmount Conservatory viewed from entrance from Victoria Hall showing door leading to the WPL

== See also ==
- Atwater Library, the other library in Westmount
- Montreal Public Libraries Network
