= Montreal Barbarians =

Rugby club in Quebec

The Montreal Barbarians Rugby Club is Rugby Quebec's second oldest member currently fielding one men's team and one women's team. The club, established in 1953, offers an opportunity for rugby players of all abilities to participate against opposition of equal ability

== History ==
The club was formed in 1953 when players who felt excluded from the Westmount Rugby Club, then known as the somewhat exclusive Montreal Scottish, decided they wanted their own team and one that was not based in the downtown. As one of the founding members, Chuck Bethel, recalls, the team first played on a huge field in Saint-Chrysostome, Quebec, but as that was somewhat distant, they moved to the West Island of Montreal. "The club played home games at Rive and Riverdale parks, but eventually moved to its present summer location at Westwood Park in Dollard."

Initially the club played in the St. Lawrence Rugger and Cricket Association, but joined the Quebec Rugby Federation (later Rugby Quebec) in 1957 and was the first provincial champion. Quebec titles followed in 1963 and 1965, and in '64 and '65 the Barbs were back to back Eastern Canadian Champions. A player of note, Ray Cornbill captained the 1964 championship team, later going on to be coach of the US Eagles national team.

The club's true glory days were later, between 1997 and 2006, when they won the championship nine times in ten seasons, a feat only equaled, previously, by Ste Anne de Bellevue RFC.

The Barabarians also have one of the oldest women's side in Quebec. Formed in 1991, they have won the provincial championship in 2004, 2006, and 2012.

== Women's team seasons ==
Season	Division	W	T	L	PF	PA	TF	TA	Pts	Finish	Result
2017	Super	3	0	7	186	402	31	65	17	5th	
+	First (II team)	2	0	8	135	291	53	74	13	8th	
2018	Super	0	0	10	57	652	9	101	0	6th	
+	Third (II team)	2	0	8	160	377	27	63	12	5th	
2019	First	3	0	7	213	506	35	82	16	4th	
+	Cup	0	0	1	0	58	-	-	-	-	
2021	???	-	-	-	-	-	-	-	-	-	
2022	First	3	0	2	122	165	22	27	16	7th	
+	Cup	0	0	1	20	48	-	-	-	-	
2023	First	0	0	8	58	506	10	88	1	5th	
2024	Second	5	1	1	333	142	54	23	29	3rd	
+	Cup	0	0	1	17	34	-	-	-	-	
2025	Second	1	0	9	172	414	28	64	8	8th	
2026	Second	5	0	5	199	291	32	38	25	3rd	
+	Cup	0	0	1	12	55	-	-	-	-	

Note - league competition was halted in 2020 and 2021 due to covid.

== Men's team seasons ==
Season	Division	W	T	L	PF	PA	TF	TA	Pts	Finish	Result
2017	Developmental	8	0	2	491	153	73	24	42	1st	League champ
+	Cup	2	0	0	45	36	-	-	-	-	Cup champ
2018	Third	1	0	8	163	455	23	72	6	6th	
2019	Third	2	0	6	164	319	26	51	13	4th	
+	Cup	0	0	1	0	36	-	-	-	-	
2023	Third	0	0	8	33	546	5	86	0	9th	
2024	Third	1	1	7	91	542	16	88	6	5th	
2025	Third	0	0	10	44	558	7	83	0	6th	
2026	Third	0	0	9	5	474	1	?	0	5th	

Note - league competition was halted in 2020 and 2021 due to covid, and the team did not field a squad in 2021 and 2022.
