= Rugby Quebec =

Canadian rugby federation

- Full name: Fédération de Rugby du Québec
- Founded: 1883 - Quebec Rugby Football Union; 1975 - Rugby Quebec
- Location: Quebec, Canada
- League: Canadian Rugby Union

Official website
- rugbyquebec.org/index.php/en/home/

Rugby Québec is the popular name of the Fédération de Rugby du Québec (formerly the Québec Rugby Union) which is the provincial governing body for the sport of rugby union in the Canadian province of Québec. The Fédération de Rugby du Québec is affiliated with the Canadian Rugby Union.

The Fédération de Rugby du Québec's origins are hard to trace for two reasons. First, rugby union in Canada converged with and then later split from the game of Canadian football, often with rugby football unions representing both games, thus making an exact history hard to establish. Second, the Fédération de Rugby du Québec has not put a great emphasis on maintaining detailed historical records. This has led to gaps in its administrative and competition history and the lost information may never be known.

The Westmount Rugby Club traces its roots back to 1876 or 1878, and some sort of organized rugby has been played in Québec ever since. In the 1920s and 1930s many clubs made the transition to professional or semi-professional football. Regardless, several leagues were formed during the 1950s that were not associated with the Québec Rugby Union. This changed in the later 1960s and in the late 1970s the union officially changed its name to the Fédération de Rugby du Québec.

The FRQ has many differing levels and types of competition. There are two predominant competitions that have the longest historical record. The first is the Premier Championship Cup, which is awarded annually to the best rugby team in cup competition. This has also been known as the "Quebec Cup", Senior Cup, the First Division Cup, the A Division Cup and (formerly) the Standard Life Cup and can trace its origins back to the 1950s. The second oldest championship is the Intermediate Cup, awarded to the best club team in the second side cup competition. This has also been known as the Second Division Cup, the B Division Cup and the Des O'Neill Trophy.

== Original clubs ==
As leagues in Montréal and the St. Lawrence Rugger and Cricket Association were formed, the first cohort of modern clubs was founded.

- Montreal Barbarians RFC - founded in 1953 and primarily located in the West Island of Montréal, this suburban club was Québec champions in 1957, 1963 and 1964, was First Division champs in 1997 to 1999 and 2002 to 2006 and, finally, was Second Division champs in 1997 to 1999 and 2001 to 2006.
- Westmount Rugby Club - possibly the oldest rugby club in North America, this team, once known as the Montreal (Rugby) Football Club, merged the Montreal Amateur Athletic Association and later became the Montreal Scottish RFC. After some members left to form the Wanderers and Barbarians, the club settled down in Westmount, and during its glory years in the 1960s challenged for many titles.
- Town of Mount Royal RFC - founded in 1955, members of this club would later found the Montreal Irish RFC. Situated in TMR and owners of its own clubhouse, this club once was a league powerhouse and has returned to championship form. (Sadly, in 2017 the clubhouse, known as Scobie Hall and owned and home since 1971, burned down)
- Montreal Wanderers RFC - founded in 1957 as an offshoot of Westmount Rugby Club, and now located in Verdun, this team was one of the premier teams in eastern Canada during the 1960s.

- Montreal Irish RFC - founded in 1957, this urban based team later moved out to its own grounds and clubhouse in the rural suburbs of Montréal. Once a powerhouse, with First Division championships in 1958, 1959, 1969 and 1982, and a Second Division title in 1982. The club has more recently returned to prominence winning the Premier Division Championship in 2010, 2011, 2014, 2015, 2017 and 2018

== Ontario based clubs playing in Quebec ==
The early years of the Québec Rugby Union saw several teams from Ontario, specifically the Ottawa Valley, become league members. In 1956 the Bytown Beavers left the Ontario Rugby Union to play in Montreal because the travel for away games was shorter.. Teams from Ontario would continue to play in Quebec until 1982, winning 10 championships in 27 seasons, but would all eventually leave to join the Eastern Ontario Rugby Union which was formed in 1979.

- Bytown Beavers RFC - played their first game against Westmount Rugby Club on October 20, 1951 at Ashbury College. Playing in the Québec Rugby Union in 1956 and becoming the Ottawa Beavers RFC in 1959, they won the Québec championship in 1966, 1970, 1972, 1974 and 1977, before leaving the league.
- Ottawa Indians RFC - founded in 1962 with players from the Bytown Beavers RFC, they played the first game between Ottawa based teams, losing to the Beavers by 6-3 in September, 1962. Having played in Quebec, they would eventually change their team name to the Ottawa Ospreys RFC in 2018.
- Ottawa Irish RFC - founded in 1963 from players that split off from the Bytown Beavers RFC, they played in the Québec Rugby Union, winning championships in 1975, 1976, 1979 and 1980. Additionally, they won the Eastern Canadian championship (Carling Cup) in 1979, 1980, and 1981.
- Deep River Blues RFC - founded in the late 1950s by scientists who worked at the Chalk River Nuclear Laboratories in Chalk River, the club played into the 1970s, winning the Quebec championship in 1968.
- Ottawa Scottish RFC - was founded in 1976, played in Quebec, and later relocated and renamed Barrhaven Scottish RFC.
- Bytown Blues RFC was formed in 1971.
- Lynwood (Village) RFC won the Intermediate (Second Division) championship in 1979 and competed at the inaugural Canadian-American Rugby Tournament in 1974.

== First French Canadian rugby club ==
The Amicale XV rugby club of Montreal, as reported in Montréal-Matin, played it first game on September 1, 1968, being both the first and only French rugby club in Canada.

- Amicale Franco-Canadienne XV - played their first game on September 1, 1968, beating the Montreal Irish RFC 11-3 at Rarymont School stadium. The next week they beat the Ottawa Indians RFC 14-3 in Ottawa on September 8, and were hosting the Ottawa Beavers RFC in Montreal the next weekend. On October 26, 1968 Amicale lost to the Montreal Wanderers RFC by 9-3 in Intermediate (or Second Division) play. The team played only in the fall of 1968.

== First Expansion ==
The union began to expand in the 1970s and 1980s, with its first wave of new clubs. Additionally, for a good part of the 1970s several Ottawa based rugby teams regularly completed in the QRU, including the Ottawa Indians, Ottawa Irish, Ottawa Beavers, Ottawa Scottish and the Deep River Blues. Of particular importance was the entry of the Club de rugby Parc olympique into the FRQ, as it was the second primarily francophone team (and first permanent team) in the federation.

- Ormstown Saracens RFC - formed in 1972, this was the first rural based team in the union. They challenged for and won several championships during the 1970s and 1980s. The Ormstown Saracens Rugby Football Club, founded by Rod Beattie and Dave Hardy, wear red and navy blue. In the 1980s the Saracens were successful, finishing first in the league in 1981, ‘82, ‘84 and ‘87. They won the Standard Life Cup (First Division Cup) in 1985.
- Ste-Anne-de-Bellevue RFC - known commonly as "SABRFC", Ste-Anne-de-Bellvue RFC originated around 1964 as the McDonald College (the agricultural school of McGill University) team situated in Ste-Anne-de-Bellevue on the westernmost part of the island of Montréal. Officially changed to Ste-Anne-de-Bellevue RFC in 1981, they have been the dominant team in the FRQ, winning 17 Senior titles (81, 83, 86, 87, 88, 89, 90, 91, 92, 93, 94, 07, 08, 09, 12, 13, 16) and 11 Intermediate titles (83, 86, 87, 89, 91, 92, 02, 09, 10, 11, 13). In 2013, SABRFC's three Senior Men's teams swept the FRQ Premiership, Reserves, and Division IV leagues.
- Montreal Grads RFC - originally the McGill Graduates, formed by grads of that university, this popular social side played at Trenholme Park in Notre Dame de Grace during the 1970s and 1980s, after which it disbanded in 1993, having won a second division cup once. Legal activist James Lockyer was one of the founders.
- Chateauguay River Rats RFC - this successful but short lived team played on the South Shore and won one Second Division title during its time in the 1980s.
- Beaconsfield RFC - formed in 1983 and playing in the West Island, this team took many of its talented players from the English language high schools of the area, and later progressed to the First Division. They won the 2nd Division championship in 1984 and 2007.
- St. Lambert Locks RFC - formed in 1984 this South Shore team won the Second Division title in 1984 and 1986, and has added Senior titles in 1995, 96 and 2000. Members of this club would form the Montreal Exiles.
- Club de rugby Parc Olympique - formed in 1983 and originally situated at the training field at the Olympic Stadium, this highly competitive team won several titles. Its greatest significance was that it was the second francophone team in what was predominantly an anglophone organization. The formation of this team marked a true turning point in the history of rugby in Québec.
- Brome Lake Ducks RFC - formed in 1986 and the first team to be situated in the Eastern Townships, this young club survived many enjoyable but hard fought seasons to eventually become a two time championship team (2005 and 2006.)

== Recent Expansion ==
The FRQ experienced substantial growth in the past three decades, and has added many new clubs, especially because rugby now enjoys a much greater popularity in French language school boards.

- Club de Rugby de Québec - founded in 1988 as le Rugby Olympique Club de Québec, merged with Le Celtique de Ste-Foy and les Amazonnes in 2005.
- Club de rugby les Nomades Laval-Laurentides-Lanaudières - founded in 1990, located in Laval.
- Les Braves de Trois-Rivières - founded in 1993 by Edward Daly
- Rugby Club de Montréal - founded in 1995 and plays at Plateau Mont-Royal. Won the Provincial 1 division in 2003 and made it to the provincial Super League final in 2004. Won the Provincial 1 division reserve and Provincial 3 division in 2008, and the Provincial 1 reserve division in 2022 and 2003. Their women's side won the Quebec Cup in 2007.
- Barracudas Rugby de St-Jean sur Richelieu - founded in 1998, in 2025 they entered into an agreement with the St. Lambert Locks RFC and are represented by that team.
- Sherbrooke Abenakis RFC - founded in 1998
- Mont-Tremblant RFC- founded in 2008.
- Rugby XV de Montréal - founded in 2010.
- NDG Dragons Rugby Club - founded in 2011 and located in Notre-Dame-de-Grâce, the club is primarily youth rugby, though the team did play in the 2017 Developmental League.
- Armada Montreal RFC - founded in 2014, Armada Montréal RFC is the first inclusive gay rugby club in Quebec, welcoming all players regardless of sexual orientation. They have played in league competitions, but usually play friendly and competitive matches, sometimes in Montreal, sometimes on the road, and participates in national and international tournaments.
- les Gladiateurs (Rugby Outaouais) - founded in 2015.
- Club de Rugby Rabaska de Victoriaville - founded in 2016, primarily youth rugby.
- Club de Rugby Lumberjacks (St-Georges) - founded in 2017
- Rugby Châteauguay - founded in 2021
- Rugby Club Ottawa - founded in 2024.
- Montréal Phénix Rugby - founded in 2025.

No longer playing:

- Le Mirage de Gatineau - part of L’association de Rugby Régionale de l’Outaouais, played in 2005
- Beauport Logers - which merged later with Club de Rugby de Québec
- Les Patriotes du Vieux-Montréal - founded 2005
- Montreal Exiles - founded in 2011, with players from St. Lambert Locks RFC
- Chelsea RFC - founded in 2005, Chelsea Rugby was a youth development program.
- Le club de rugby Les Gaulois - played in 2023 as a youth development program.

Two teams, the Chateauguay Hammerheads and Hudson Highlanders, played at the turn of the century, but have ceased.

== Current Clubs (as of 2026 season) ==
- SUPER LEAGUE - men (and reserve division) : Beaconsfield RFC, Town of Mount Royal RFC, Rugby Club de Montréal, Club de Rugby de Québec, Club de rugby Sainte-Anne de Bellevue, Montreal Irish RFC
- LEAGUE 1 - men (and reserve division) : Parc Olympique, Montreal Wanderers RFC, St-Lambert Locks RFC, Abénakis de Sherbrooke, XV de Montréal, Westmount Rugby Club
- LEAGUE 2 - men : Brome Lake Ducks, Braves de Trois-Rivières, Ormstown Saracens RFC, Montréal Phénix Rugby
- LEAGUE 3 "A"- men : Mont-Tremblant RFC, Nomades de Laval, Barracudas Rugby de St-Jean sur Richelieu, Montreal Barbarians RFC, Armada Montreal RFC
- LEAGUE 3 "B"- men : Club de rugby Sainte-Anne de Bellevue III, Club de Rugby de Québec II, Town of Mount Royal RFC III
- SUPER LEAGUE - women : Club de Rugby de Québec, Town of Mount Royal RFC, Club de rugby Sainte-Anne de Bellevue, Rugby Club Ottawa, Beaconsfield RFC, IROCKS (Montreal Irish RFC & St-Lambert Locks RFC)
- LEAGUE 1 - women : Montreal Wanderers RFC, Club de Rugby de Québec II, Abénakis de Sherbrooke, Rugby Club de Montréal, St-Georges Lumberjacks,
- LEAGUE 2 - women : Braves de Trois-Rivières, IROCKS II (Montreal Irish RFC & St-Lambert Locks RFC), Beaconsfield RFC II, Town of Mount Royal RFC II, Club de Rugby de Québec III, Montreal Barbarians RFC
- LEAGUE 3 - women : Club de rugby Sainte-Anne de Bellevue II, Abénakis de Sherbrooke II, Rugby Châteauguay, Ormstown Saracens RFC, Westmount Rugby Club, Mont-Tremblant RFC

== Rugby Quebec Men's Cup Champions ==
- 1957 — Montreal Barbarians
- 1958 — Montreal Irish RFC
- 1959 — Montreal Irish RFC
- 1960 — Town of Mount Royal RFC
- 1961 — Town of Mount Royal RFC
- 1962 — Montreal Wanderers RFC
- 1963 — Montreal Barbarians
- 1964 — Montreal Barbarians
- 1965 — Montreal Wanderers RFC
- 1966 — Ottawa Beavers RFC
- 1967 — Montreal Irish RFC
- 1968 — Deep River Blues RFC (2nd Division: Town of Mount Royal RFC)
- 1969 — Montreal Irish RFC
- 1970 — Ottawa Beavers RFC
- 1971 — Montreal Wanderers RFC
- 1972 — Ottawa Beavers RFC
- 1973 — Montreal Irish RFC
- 1974 — Ottawa Beavers RFC
- 1975 — Ottawa Irish RFC
- 1976 — Ottawa Irish RFC
- 1977 — Ottawa Beavers RFC
- 1978 — Montreal Wanderers RFC
- 1979 — Ottawa Irish RFC (2nd Division: Lynwood)
- 1980 — Ottawa Irish RFC
- 1981 — Ste Anne de Bellevue RFC
- 1982 — Montreal Irish RFC
- 1983 — Ste Anne de Bellevue RFC
- 1984 — Town of Mount Royal RFC
- 1985 — Ormstown Saracens
- 1986 — Ste Anne de Bellevue RFC
- 1987 — Ste Anne de Bellevue RFC
- 1988 — Ste Anne de Bellevue RFC
- 1989 — Ste Anne de Bellevue RFC
- 1990 — Ste Anne de Bellevue RFC
- 1991 — Ste Anne de Bellevue RFC
- 1992 — Ste Anne de Bellevue RFC
- 1993 — Ste Anne de Bellevue RFC
- 1994 — Ste Anne de Bellevue RFC
- 1995 — Montreal Wanderers RFC
- 1996 — St-Lambert Locks
- 1997 — Montreal Barbarians
- 1998 — Montreal Barbarians
- 1999 — Montreal Barbarians
- 2000 — St-Lambert Locks
- 2001 — Montreal Barbarians
- 2002 — Montreal Barbarians
- 2003 — Montreal Barbarians
- 2004 — Montreal Barbarians
- 2005 — Montreal Barbarians
- 2006 — Montreal Barbarians
- 2007 — Ste Anne de Bellevue RFC
- 2008 — Ste Anne de Bellevue RFC
- 2009 — Ste Anne de Bellevue RFC
- 2010 — Montreal Irish RFC
- 2011 — Montreal Irish RFC
- 2012 — Ste Anne de Bellevue RFC
- 2013 — Ste Anne de Bellevue RFC
- 2014 — Montreal Irish RFC
- 2015 — Montreal Irish RFC
- 2016 — Ste Anne de Bellevue RFC
- 2017 — Montreal Irish RFC
- 2018 — Montreal Irish RFC
- 2019 — Town of Mount Royal RFC
- 2020 — No cup awarded due to Covid-19
- 2021 — No cup awarded due to Covid-19
- 2022 — Town of Mount Royal RFC
- 2023 — Town of Mount Royal RFC
- 2024 — Beaconsfield RFC
- 2025 — Town of Mount Royal RFC

== Recent Men's Champions ==
Note - league and cup competition was halted in 2020 and the cup was cancelled in 2021 due to covid.

Year	Super League champion	Super League Cup winner
2017	Bytown Blues	Montreal Irish 45-36 Bytown Blues
2018	Kingston Panthers	Montreal Irish 25-11 Club de Rugby de Québec
2019	Town of Mount Royal	Town of Mount Royal 44-12 Club de Rugby de Québec
2020		no cup play - covid
2021	Montreal Irish	no cup play - covid
2022	Town of Mount Royal	Town of Mount Royal 22-10 Beaconsfield
2023	Beaconsfield	Town of Mount Royal 15-13 Beaconsfield
2024	Beaconsfield	Beaconsfield 20-19 Town of Mount Royal
2025	Beaconsfield	Town of Mount Royal 33-28 Beaconsfield
2026	Beaconsfield	Beaconsfield 24-18 Town of Mount Royal

Year	Super League Reserve champion	Super League Reserve Cup winner
2017	Montreal Irish II	Montreal Irish II 17-10 Bytown Blues II
2018	Montreal Irish II	Ste-Anne-de-Bellevue II 50-19 Montreal Irish II
2019	Montreal Irish II	Montreal Irish II 27-21 Town of Mount Royal II
2020		no cup play - covid
2021		no cup play - covid
2022	Town of Mount Royal II	Town of Mount Royal II 44-25 Beaconsfield II
2023	Montreal Irish II	Montreal Irish II beat Ste-Anne-de-Bellevue II
2024	Town of Mount Royal II	Town of Mount Royal II 18-8 Rugby Club de Montréal II
2025	Rugby Club de Montréal II	Beaconsfield II 43-17 Rugby Club de Montréal II
2026	Rugby Club de Montréal II	Rugby Club de Montréal II 20-17 Town of Mount Royal II

Year	Provincial 1 League champion	Provincial 1 Cup winner
2017	Sherbrooke Abenakis	Ottawa Irish 38-35 Barrhaven Scottish
2018	Town of Mount Royal	Town of Mount Royal 62-31 Parc Olympique
2019	Sainte-Anne de Bellevue	Ste-Anne-de-Bellevue 35-26 Beaconsfield
2020		no cup play - covid
2021	Westmount	no cup play - covid
2022	Westmount	Rugby Club de Montréal beat Westmount
2023	Rugby Club de Montréal	Rugby Club de Montréal 24-17 Montreal Wanderers
2024	Ste-Anne-de-Bellevue	Ste-Anne-de-Bellevue 32-17 Rugby Club Ottawa
2025	Montreal Irish	Montreal Irish beat Montreal Wanderers
2026	Parc Olympique	Parc Olympique 47-7 XV de Montréal

NOTE: in 2023 4 teams from 1 League (Rugby Club de Montréal, Westmount, Montreal Wanderers, Abénakis de Sherbrooke) were combined with 4 teams from 2 League (Brome Lake Ducks, Ormstown Saracens, St-Lambert Locks, Braves de Trois-Rivières) and played an interlocking, uneven schedule for League play, but not Cup playoffs.

Year	Provincial 1 Reserve League champion	Provincial 1 reserve Cup winner
2017	Parc Olympique II	Parc Olympique II 20-13 Barrhaven Scottish II
2018	Parc Olympique II	Town of Mount Royal II 28-10 Rugby Club de Montréal II
2019	Ste-Anne-de-Bellevue II	Rugby Club de Montréal II 26-22 Ste-Anne-de-Bellevue II
2020		no cup play - covid
2021	covid	no cup play - covid
2022	Rugby Club de Montréal II	Rugby Club de Montréal II 17-15 Montreal Wanderers II
2023	Rugby Club de Montréal II	Rugby Club de Montréal II 23-22 Montreal Wanderers II
2024	Ste-Anne-de-Bellevue II	Ste-Anne-de-Bellevue II 39-17 Montreal Wanderers II
2025	Montreal Irish II	XV de Montréal II 22-10 Montreal Irish II
2026	Parc Olympique II	Parc Olympique II 37-23 Montreal Wanderers II

NOTE: in 2023 4 teams from 1 Reserve League (Rugby Club de Montréal II, Westmount II, Montreal Wanderers II, Abénakis de Sherbrooke II) were combined with 5 teams from 3 League (Montreal Barbarians, XV de Montréal, Mont-Tremblant RFC, Nomades de Laval, Rabaska de Victoriaville) and played an interlocking, uneven schedule for League play, but not Cup playoffs.

Year	Provincial 2 League champion	Provincial 2 Cup winner
2017	Rugby Club de Montréal	Rugby Club de Montréal 21-8 Westmount
2018	Beaconsfield	Beaconsfield 32-19 St-Lambert Locks
2019	Montreal Wanderers	Montreal Wanderers 16-9 Westmount
2020		no cup play - covid
2021	Mont-Tremblant	no cup play - covid
2022	Brome Lake Ducks	Brome Lake Ducks 26-24 Les Braves de Trois-Rivières
2023	see Provincial 1 League (Brome Lake Ducks)	Brome Lake Ducks 40-10 St-Lambert Locks
2024	Brome Lake Ducks	Brome Lake Ducks 20-17 Les Braves de Trois-Rivières
2025	St-Lambert Locks RFC	Ormstown Saracens 42-26 Brome Lake Ducks
2026	Les Braves de Trois-Rivières	Brome Lake Ducks 20-10 Les Braves de Trois-Rivières

NOTE: in 2023 4 teams from 1 League (Rugby Club de Montréal, Westmount, Montreal Wanderers, Abénakis de Sherbrooke) were combined with 4 teams from 2 League (Brome Lake Ducks, Ormstown Saracens, St-Lambert Locks, Braves de Trois-Rivières) and played an interlocking, uneven schedule for League play, but not Cup playoffs.

Year	Provincial 3 League champion	Provincial 3 Cup winner
2017	Ottawa Osprey	Brome Lake Ducks 40-17 Les Braves de Trois-Rivières
2018	Ormstown Saracens	Ormstown Saracens 39-15 Les Braves de Trois-Rivières
2019	Barracudas Rugby de St-Jean	Les Braves de Trois-Rivières 25-22 Barracudas Rugby de St-Jean
2020		no cup play - covid
2021		no cup play - covid
2022	no play	
2023	see Provincial 1 Reserve League (XV de Montréal)	XV de Montréal 21-7 Mont-Tremblant
2024	XV de Montréal II	Mont-Tremblant beat XV de Montréal II
2025	Montréal Phénix Rugby	Montréal Phénix Rugby 19-6 Nomades de Laval
2026 "A"	Nomades de Laval	Mont-Tremblant 44-39 Nomades de Laval
2026 "B"	Ste-Anne-de-Bellevue III	Ste-Anne-de-Bellevue III 29-17 Club de Rugby de Quebec III

NOTE: in 2023 4 teams from 1 Reserve League (Rugby Club de Montréal II, Westmount II, Montreal Wanderers II, Abénakis de Sherbrooke II) were combined with 5 teams from 3 League (Montreal Barbarians, XV de Montréal, Mont-Tremblant RFC, Nomades de Laval, Rabaska de Victoriaville) and played an interlocking, uneven schedule for League play, but not Cup playoffs.

Year	Developmental League champion	Developmental Cup winner
2017	Barbarians	Barbarians 26-24 Rugby Club de Montréal II
2018	XV de Montréal	XV de Montréal 20-19 Mont-Tremblant
2019 - 1	Montreal Wanderers II	Mont-Tremblant 29-25 Montreal Wanderers II
2019 - 2	Town of Mount Royal III	
2023	Le club de rugby Les Gaulois	(Le club de rugby Les Gaulois 22-12 Armada) only game played

Year	Championnat Loisir League champion	Championnat Loisir Cup winner
2017	Mont-Tremblant	Mont-Tremblant 44-10 Town of Mount Royal III

== Recent Women's Champions ==
Note - league and cup competition was halted in 2020 and the cup was cancelled in 2021 due to covid.

Year	Super League champion	Super League Cup winner
2017	Club de Rugby de Québec	Club de Rugby de Québec 46-39 Town of Mount Royal
2018	Club de Rugby de Québec	Club de Rugby de Québec 24-17 Town of Mount Royal
2019	Club de Rugby de Québec	Club de Rugby de Québec 11-7 Ste-Anne-de-Bellevue
2020		no cup play - covid
2021	Club de Rugby de Québec	no cup play - covid
2022	Club de Rugby de Québec	Club de Rugby de Québec 50-0 Ste-Anne-de-Bellevue
2023	Club de Rugby de Québec	Club de Rugby de Québec 41-0 Town of Mount Royal
2024	Club de Rugby de Québec	Club de Rugby de Québec 34-7 Ste-Anne-de-Bellevue
2025	Club de Rugby de Québec	Club de Rugby de Québec 25-20 Town of Mount Royal
2026	Club de Rugby de Québec	Club de Rugby de Québec 19-12 Ste-Anne-de-Bellevue

Year	Super League Reserve champion	Super League Reserve Cup winner
2023	Sainte-Anne de Bellevue II	Sainte-Anne de Bellevue II beat Beaconsfield II
2024	Club de Rugby de Québec II	Club de Rugby de Québec II 24-22 Beaconsfield II

Year	Provincial 1 League champion	Provincial 1 Cup winner
2017	Club de Rugby de Québec II	St-Lambert Locks 33-5 Club de Rugby de Québec II
2018	Ottawa Irish	Abénakis de Sherbrooke 55-38 Kingston Panthers
2019	Club de Rugby de Québec II	Club de Rugby de Québec II 25-5 Ottawa Irish
2020		no cup play - covid
2021	???	no cup play - covid
2022	St-Lambert Locks	St-Lambert Locks 13-12 Beaconsfield
2023	Abénakis de Sherbrooke	Club de Rugby de Québec II 10-7 Abénakis de Sherbrooke
2024	Rugby Club Ottawa	Club de Rugby de Québec III 34-19 Rugby Club Ottawa
2025	Montreal Irish	Beaconsfield 8-7 Montreal Irish
2026	Club de Rugby de Québec II	Club de Rugby de Québec II 36-7 Abénakis de Sherbrooke

NOTE: in 2022 there were two League One consolation cup finals.
For teams finishing 5th to 8th place, Abénakis de Sherbrooke beat Montreal Wanderers 50-15
For teams finishing 9th to 13th place, Ottawa Banshees beat Town of Mount Royal RFC II 60-26

Year	Provincial 2 League champion	Provincial 2 Cup winner
2018	Ormstown Saracens	Sainte-Anne de Bellevue II 29-28 Ormstown Saracens
2019	Beaconsfield	Beaconsfield 46-15 Montreal Wanderers
2020		no cup play - covid
2021	Montreal Irish	no cup play - covid
2023	Braves de Trois-Rivières	St-Georges Lumberjacks 22-21 Braves de Trois-Rivières
2024	Braves de Trois-Rivières	Rugby Club de Montréal beat Braves de Trois-Rivières
2025	Rugby Club de Montréal	Rugby Club de Montréal beat Montreal Wanderers
2026	Braves de Trois-Rivières	Braves de Trois-Rivières 26-12 IROCKS

Year	Provincial 3 League champion	Provincial 3 Cup winner
2019	Club de Rugby de Québec III	St-Lambert Locks RFC II 43-40 Club de Rugby de Québec III
2025	Montreal Irish II	Montreal Irish II 38-24 Rugby Châteauguay
2026	Ste-Anne-de-Bellevue II	Ste-Anne-de-Bellevue II 27-19 Rugby Châteauguay

Year	Developmental League champion	Developmental Cup winner
2017	St-Lambert Locks RFC II	Kingston Panthers 57-7 St-Lambert Locks RFC II
2018	St-Georges Lumberjacks	St-Georges Lumberjacks 32-24 Beaconsfield
2019	Abénakis de Sherbrooke II	Abénakis de Sherbrooke II 48-24 Westmount
2020		no cup play - covid
2021	???	no cup play - covid
2022	St-Georges Lumberjacks	St-Georges Lumberjacks 21-15 Braves de Trois-Rivières
